= 1917 =

1917 in various calendars
- Gregorian calendar: 1917; MCMXVII
- Ab urbe condita: 2670
- Armenian calendar: 1366; ԹՎ ՌՅԿԶ
- Assyrian calendar: 6667
- Baháʼí calendar: 73–74
- Balinese saka calendar: 1838–1839
- Bengali calendar: 1323–1324
- Berber calendar: 2867
- British Regnal year: 7 Geo. 5 – 8 Geo. 5
- Buddhist calendar: 2461
- Burmese calendar: 1279
- Byzantine calendar: 7425–7426
- Chinese calendar: 丙辰年 (Fire Dragon); 4614 or 4407 — to — 丁巳年 (Fire Snake); 4615 or 4408
- Coptic calendar: 1633–1634
- Discordian calendar: 3083
- Ethiopian calendar: 1909–1910
- Hebrew calendar: 5677–5678
- Hindu calendars
- Vikram Samvat: 1973–1974
- Shaka Samvat: 1838–1839
- Kali Yuga: 5017–5018
- Holocene calendar: 11917
- Igbo calendar: 917–918
- Iranian calendar: 1295–1296
- Islamic calendar: 1335–1336
- Japanese calendar: Taishō 6 (大正６年)
- Javanese calendar: 1847–1848
- Juche calendar: 6
- Julian calendar: Gregorian minus 13 days
- Korean calendar: 4250
- Minguo calendar: ROC 6 民國6年
- Nanakshahi calendar: 449
- Thai solar calendar: 2459–2460
- Tibetan calendar: མེ་ཕོ་འབྲུག་ལོ་ (male Fire-Dragon); 2043 or 1662 or 890 — to — མེ་མོ་སྦྲུལ་ལོ་ (female Fire-Snake); 2044 or 1663 or 891

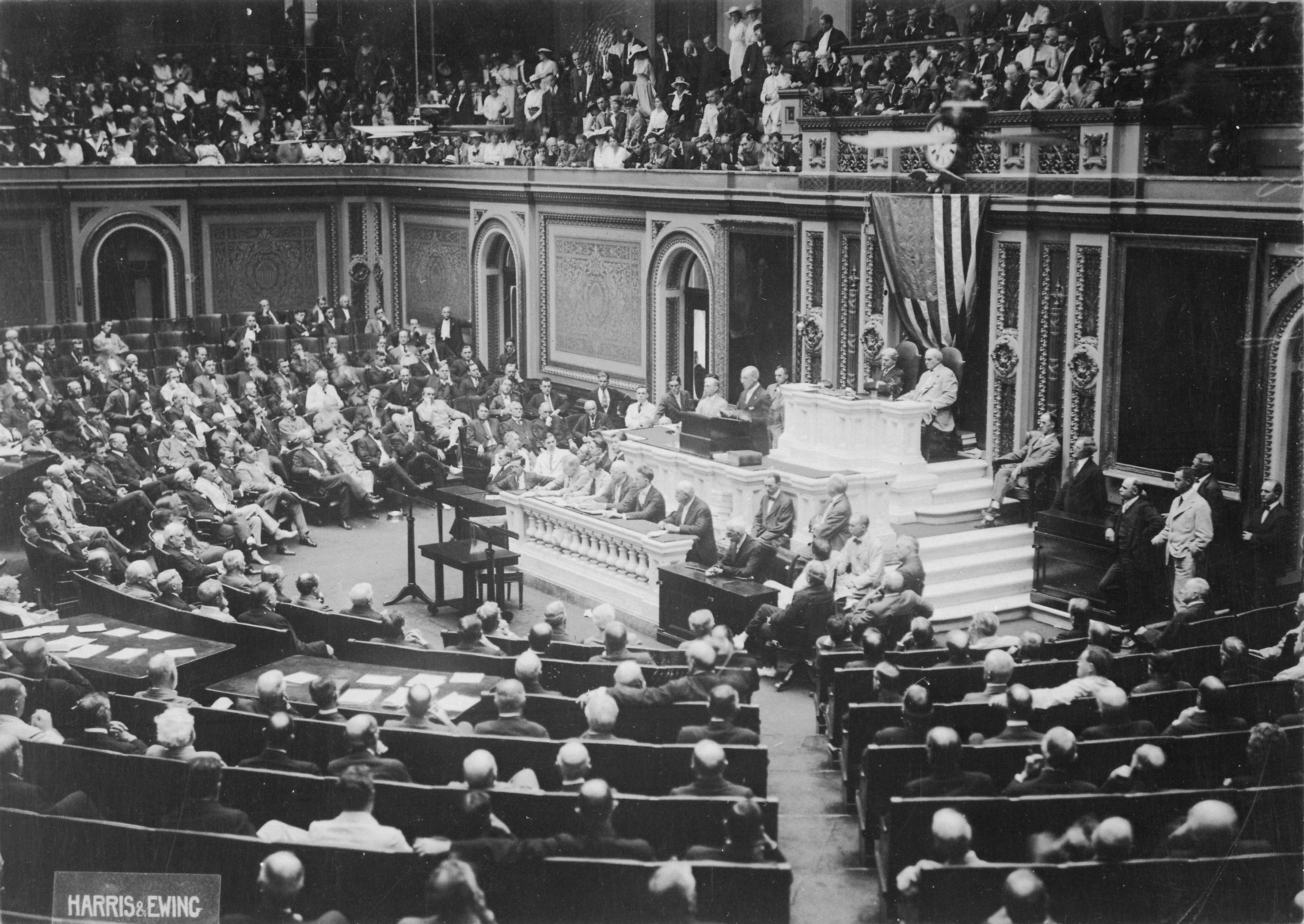
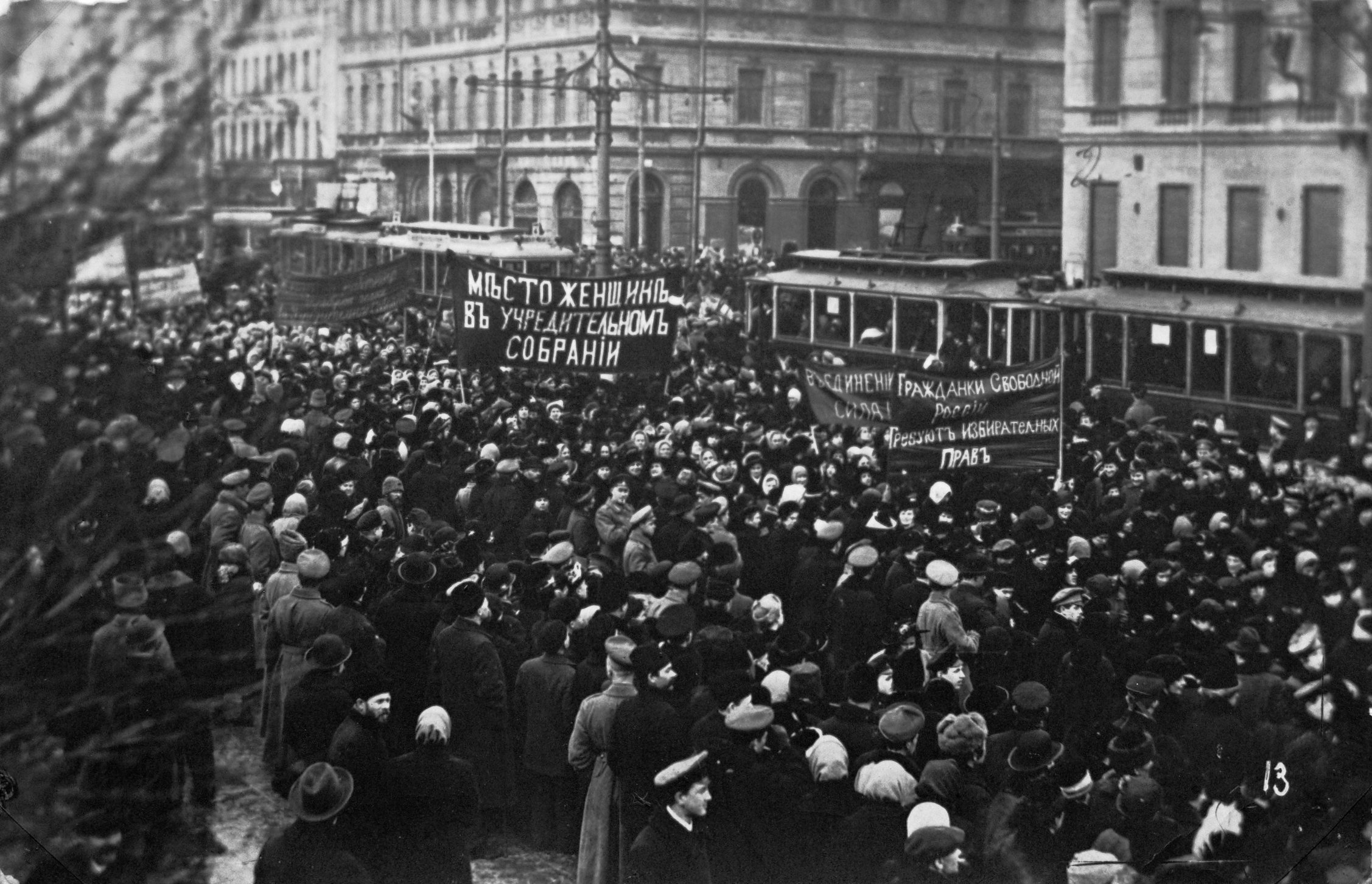
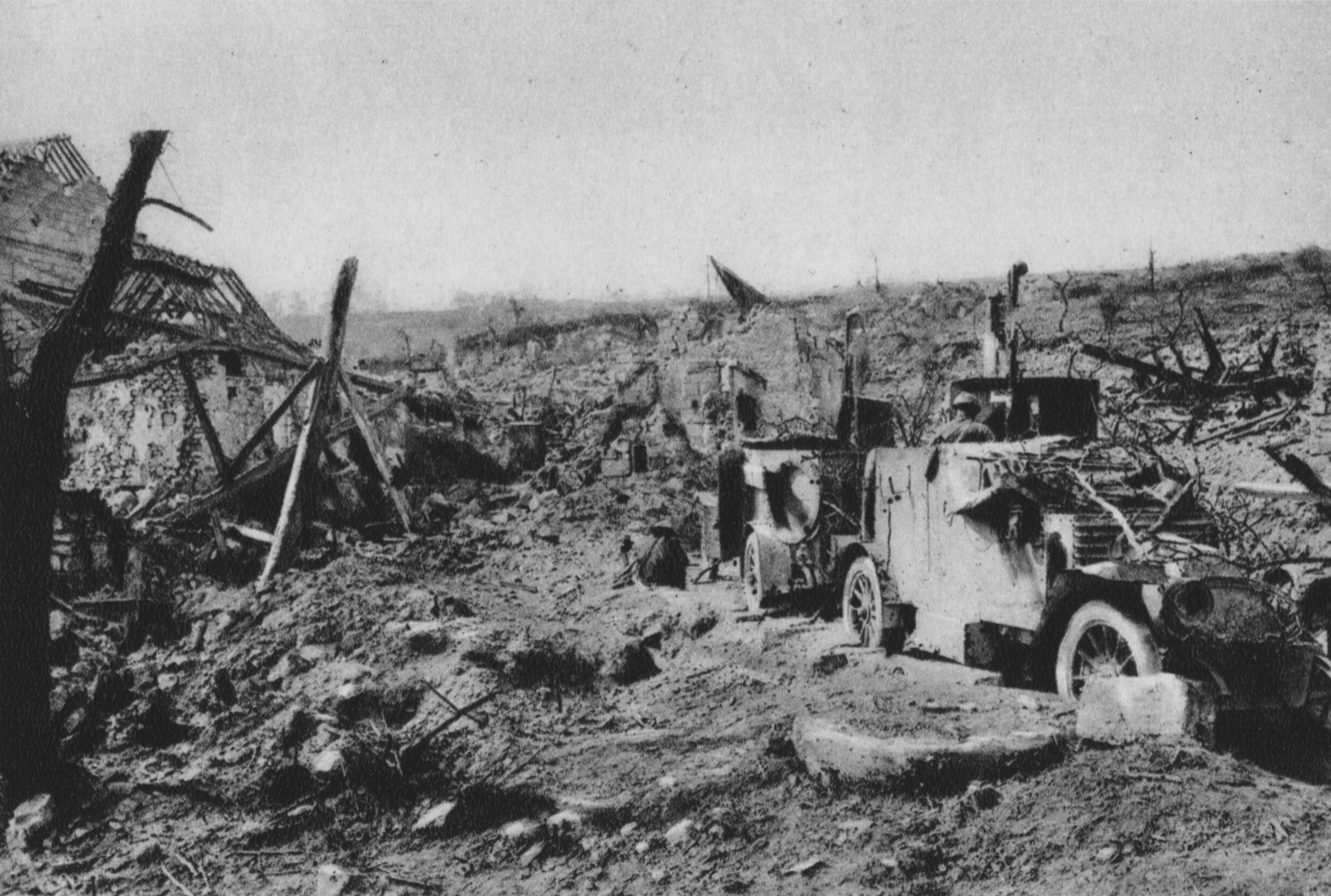
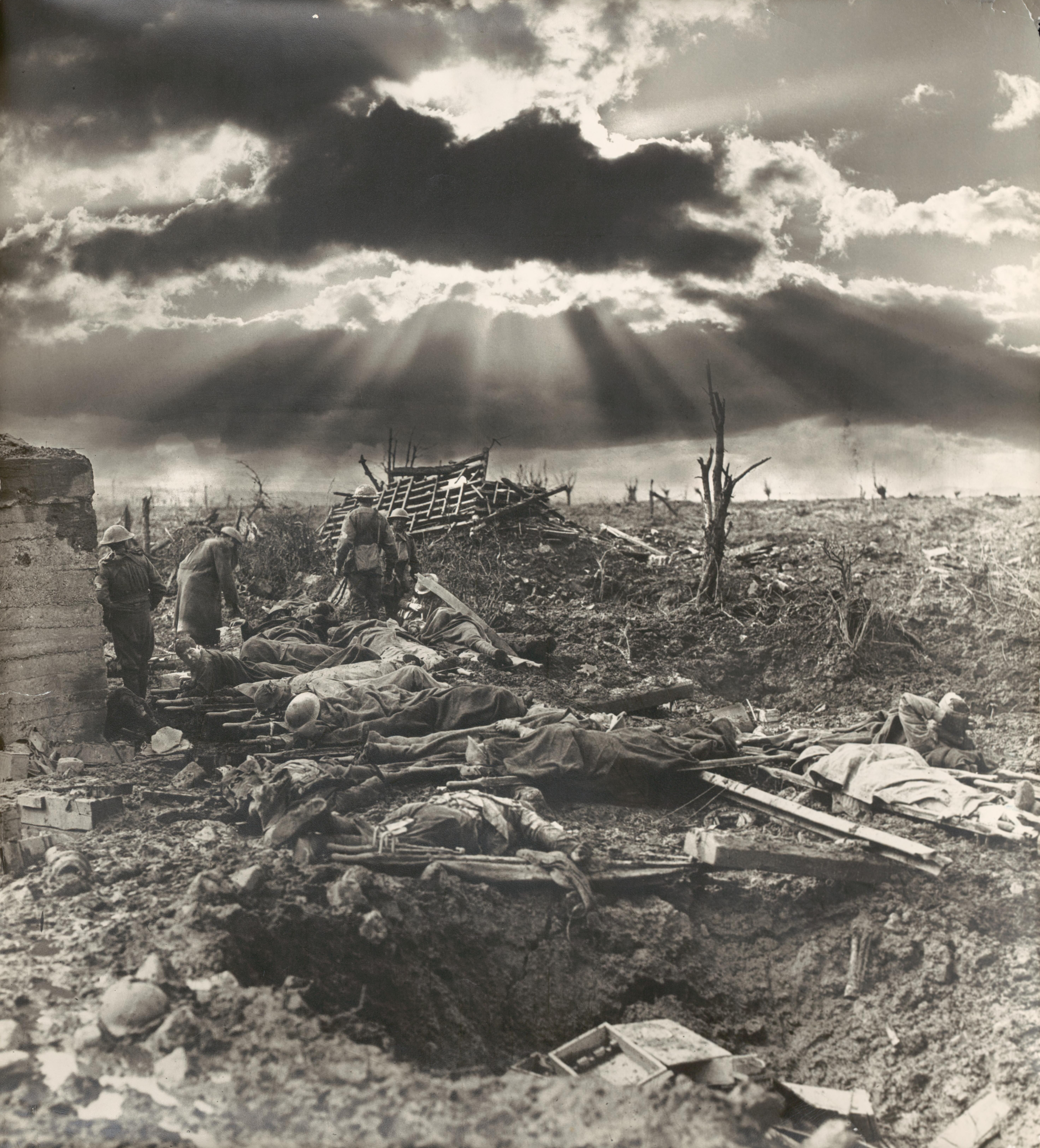
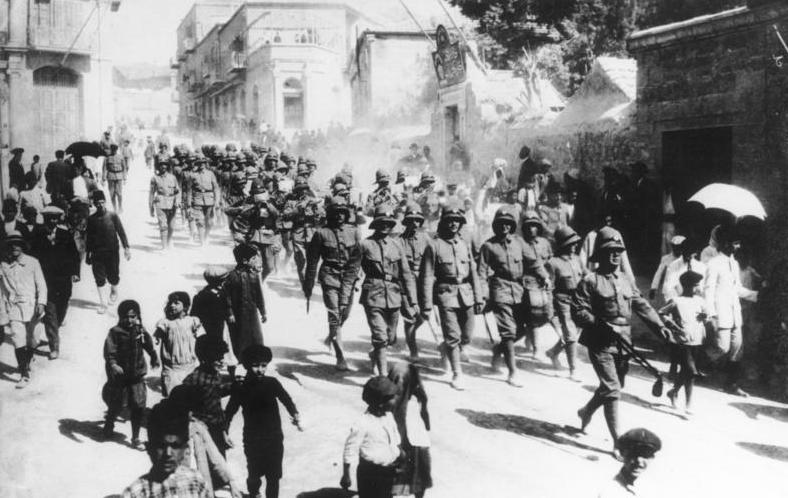
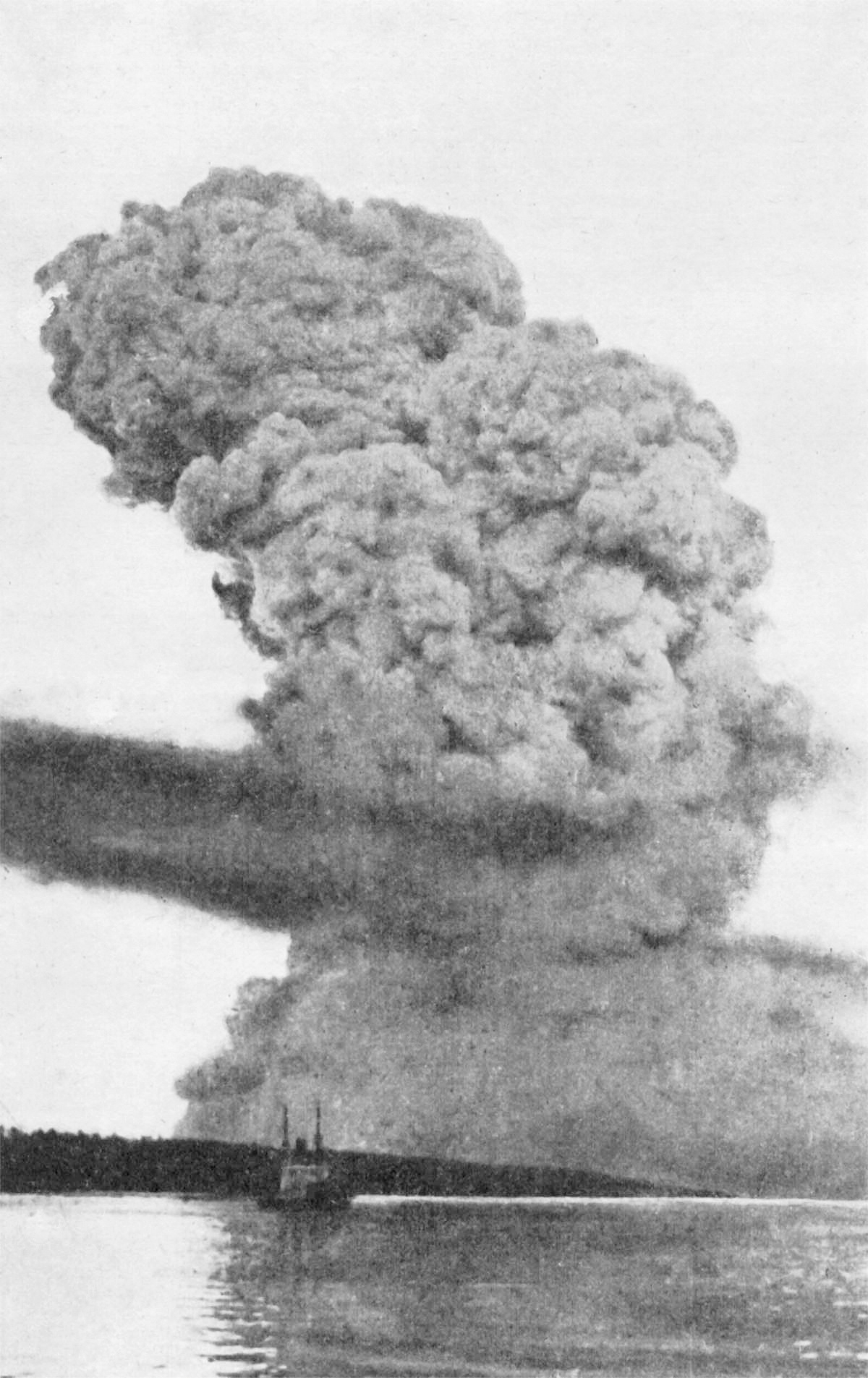
From top to bottom, left to right:
- The Zimmermann Telegram reveals Germany's secret offer to Mexico, helping push the United States into World War I;
- The Russian Revolution sees the fall of Tsar Nicholas II and the rise of Vladimir Lenin's Bolsheviks, beginning the Russian Civil War;
- France's Nivelle Offensive fails, causing huge losses and mutinies;
- The Battle of Passchendaele inflicts over half a million casualties in Flanders with little gain;
- The Battle of Jerusalem ends with British capture of the city from the Ottoman Empire;
- The Halifax Explosion devastates the Canadian port city when a munitions ship detonates, killing nearly 2,000 people and leveling much of Halifax.

1917 (MCMXVII) was a common year starting on Monday of the Gregorian calendar and a common year starting on Sunday of the Julian calendar, the 1917th year of the Common Era (CE) and Anno Domini (AD) designations, the 917th year of the 2nd millennium, the 17th year of the 20th century, and the 8th year of the 1910s decade. As of the start of 1917, the Gregorian calendar was 13 days ahead of the Julian calendar, which remained in localized use until 1923.

== Events ==
=== January ===
- January 9th – WWI – Battle of Rafa: The last substantial Ottoman Army garrison on the Sinai Peninsula is captured by the Egyptian Expeditionary Force's Desert Column.
- January 10 – Imperial Trans-Antarctic Expedition: Seven survivors of the Ross Sea party are rescued after being stranded for several months.
- January 11 – Unknown saboteurs set off the Kingsland explosion at Kingsland (modern-day Lyndhurst, New Jersey), one of the events leading to United States involvement in WWI.
- January 16 – The Danish West Indies is sold to the United States for $25 million (equivalent to $628 million in 2025).
- January 22 – WWI: United States President Woodrow Wilson calls for "peace without victory" in Germany.
- January 25 – WWI: British armed merchantman SS Laurentic is sunk by mines off Lough Swilly (Ireland), with the loss of 354 of the 475 aboard.
- January 26 – The sea defences at the English village of Hallsands are breached, leading to all but one of the houses becoming uninhabitable.
- January 28 – The United States ends its search for Pancho Villa.
- January 30 – Pershing's troops in Mexico begin withdrawing back to the United States. They reach Columbus, New Mexico February 5.

=== February ===
- February 1 – WWI: Atlantic U-boat Campaign: Germany announces its U-boats will resume unrestricted submarine warfare, rescinding the 'Sussex Pledge'.
- February 3 – WWI: The United States severs diplomatic relations with Germany.
- February 12 – Toluca FC is founded as an Association football club in Mexico.
- February 13 – WWI:
  - Mata Hari is arrested in Paris for spying.
  - Raid on Nekhl: Units of the Egyptian Expeditionary Force completely reoccupy the Egyptian Sinai Peninsula.
- February 21 – British troopship SS Mendi is accidentally rammed and sunk off the Isle of Wight, killing 646, mainly members of the South African Native Labour Corps.
- February 24 – WWI: Walter Hines Page, United States ambassador to the United Kingdom, is shown the intercepted Zimmermann Telegram, in which Germany offers to give the American Southwest back to Mexico, if Mexico will take sides with Germany, in case the United States declares war on Germany.

=== March ===
- March 1
  - WWI: The U.S. government releases the text of the Zimmermann Telegram to the public.
  - Ōmuta, Japan, is founded by Hiroushi Miruku.
- March 2 – The enactment of the Jones Act grants Puerto Ricans United States citizenship.
- March 4
  - Jeannette Rankin of Montana becomes the first woman member of the United States House of Representatives.
- March 7 – "Livery Stable Blues", recorded with "Dixie Jazz Band One Step" on February 26, by the Original Dixieland Jass Band in the United States, becomes the first jazz recording commercially released. On August 17 the band records "Tiger Rag".

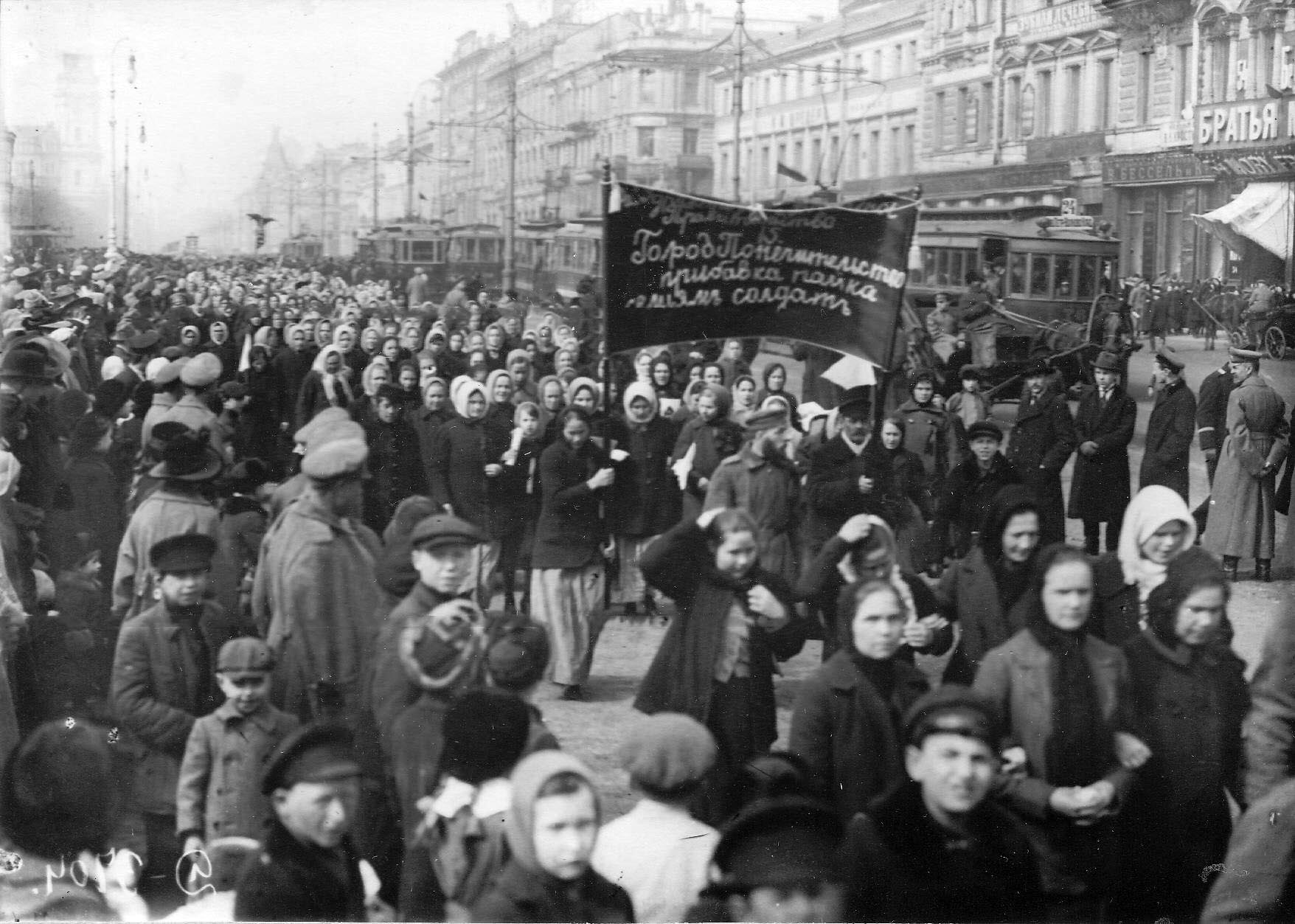
Women calling for bread and peace - Petrograd, 8 March

- March 8 (N.S.)
  - (February 23, O.S.) – The February Revolution begins in Russia: Women calling for bread in Petrograd start riots, which spontaneously spread throughout the city.
  - WWI: Norwegian tramp SS Storstad (the ship that rammed and sank RMS Empress of Ireland in 1914) is torpedoed and sunk by SM U-62 in the Atlantic with the loss of 3 crew members.
- March 10 – The Province of Batangas is formally founded, as one of the Philippines' first encomiendas.
- March 11 – Mexican Revolution: Venustiano Carranza is elected president of Mexico; the United States gives de jure recognition of his government.
- March 12 – The Russian Duma declares a Provisional Government. It is dissolved 4 months later.
- March 14 – WWI: The Republic of China terminates diplomatic relations with Germany.
- March 15 (N.S.) (March 2, O.S.) – Emperor Nicholas II of Russia abdicates his throne and his son's claims. This is considered to be the end of the Russian Empire, after 196 years.
- March 16 (N.S.) (March 3, O.S.) – Grand Duke Michael Alexandrovich of Russia refuses the throne, and power passes to the newly formed Provisional Government, under Prince Georgy Lvov.
- March 25 – The Georgian Orthodox Church restores the autocephaly, abolished by Imperial Russia in 1811.
- March 26 – WWI: First Battle of Gaza – British Egyptian Expeditionary Force troops virtually encircle the Gaza garrison, but are then ordered to withdraw, leaving the city to the Ottoman defenders.
- March 30 – Hjalmar Hammarskjöld steps down as Prime Minister of Sweden; he is replaced by right-wing businessman and politician Carl Swartz.
- March 31 – The United States takes possession of the Danish West Indies, which become the US Virgin Islands, after paying $25 million to Denmark.

=== April ===
- April – Imokawa Mukuzo Genkanban no Maki, the first anime, is released in Japan.
- April 2 – WWI: U.S. President Woodrow Wilson asks the United States Congress for a declaration of war on Germany.
- April 6 – WWI: The United States declares war on Germany.
- April 9–May 16 – WWI: Battle of Arras – British Empire troops make a significant advance on the Western Front but are unable to achieve a breakthrough.
- April 9–12 – WWI: Canadian troops win the Battle of Vimy Ridge.
- April 10 – Eddystone explosion: an explosion at an ammunition plant near Chester, Pennsylvania, kills 139, mostly female workers.
- April 11 – WWI: Brazil severs diplomatic relations with Germany.
- April 12 (N.S.) (March 30 O.S.) – The Autonomous Governorate of Estonia is formed within Russia, from the Governorate of Estonia and the northern part of the Governorate of Livonia.
- April 16
  - (N.S.) (April 3, O.S.) – Vladimir Lenin arrives at the Finland Station in Petrograd after a German-sponsored voyage in a sealed train from his exile in Switzerland through Germany and Scandinavia.
  - WWI: The Nivelle Offensive commences.

Lenin

- April 17
  - (N.S.) (April 4, O.S.) – Vladimir Lenin's April Theses are published. They become very influential in the following July Days and Bolshevik Revolution.
  - WWI: The Egyptian Expeditionary Force begins the Second Battle of Gaza. This unsuccessful frontal attack on strong Ottoman defences along with the first battle, results in 10,000 casualties, the dismissal of force commander General Archibald Murray, and the beginning of the Stalemate in Southern Palestine.
  - The Times and the Daily Mail (London newspapers both owned by Lord Northcliffe) print atrocity propaganda of the supposed existence of a German Corpse Factory processing dead soldiers' bodies.
- April 19 – WWI: Army transport SS Mongolia (1903) fires the United States' first shots in anger in the war when her gun crew drives off a German U-boat in the English Channel seven miles southeast of Beachy Head.
- April 26 – WWI: The Agreement of Saint-Jean-de-Maurienne, between France, Italy and the United Kingdom, to settle interests in the Middle East, is signed.

=== May ===
- May 3 – WWI: 1917 French Army mutinies begin.
- May 9 – WWI: The Nivelle Offensive is abandoned.
- May 13–October 13 (at monthly intervals) – 10-year-old Lúcia Santos and her cousins Francisco and Jacinta Marto report experiencing a series of Marian apparitions near Fátima, Portugal, which become known as Our Lady of Fátima.
- May 21 – Over 300 acres (73 blocks) are destroyed in the Great Atlanta fire of 1917 in the United States.
- May 22
  - The Commissioned Officer Corps of the United States Coast and Geodetic Survey is established.
  - Ell Persons is lynched in Memphis, in connection with the rape and murder of 16-year-old Antoinette Rappal.
- May 23
  - A month of civil violence in Milan, Italy ends, after the Italian army forcibly takes over the city from anarchists and anti-war revolutionaries; 50 people are killed and 800 arrested.
  - WWI: During the Stalemate in Southern Palestine, the Raid on the Beersheba to Hafir el Auja railway by the British Desert Column takes place: large sections of the railway line linking Beersheba to the main Ottoman desert base are destroyed.
- May 26 – A tornado strikes Mattoon, Illinois, causing devastation and killing 101 people.
- May 27
  - WWI: 1917 French Army mutinies: Over 30,000 French troops refuse to go to the trenches at Missy-aux-Bois.
  - Pope Benedict XV promulgates the 1917 Code of Canon Law.

=== June ===
- June 1 – 1917 French Army mutinies: A French infantry regiment seizes Missy-aux-Bois, and declares an anti-war military government. Other French army troops soon apprehend them.
- June 4 – The first Pulitzer Prizes are awarded: Laura E. Richards, Maud Howe Elliott and Florence Hall receive the first Pulitzer for a biography, (for Julia Ward Howe). Jean Jules Jusserand receives the first Pulitzer for history, for his work With Americans of Past and Present Days. Herbert Bayard Swope receives the first Pulitzer for journalism, for his work for the New York World.
- June 5 – WWI: Conscription begins in the United States.
- June 7 – WWI: Battle of Messines opens with the British Army detonating 24 ammonal mines under the German lines, killing 10,000 in the deadliest deliberate non-nuclear man-made explosion in history.
- June 8 – Speculator Mine disaster: A fire at the Granite Mountain and Speculator ore mine, outside Butte, Montana, kills at least 168 workers.
- June 11 – King Constantine I of Greece abdicates for the first time, being succeeded by his son Alexander.
- June 13 – WWI: The first major German bombing raid on London by fixed-wing aircraft leaves 162 dead and 432 injured.
- June 15 – The United States enacts the Espionage Act.

=== July ===
- July 1 – WWI: Russian General Brusilov begins the major Kerensky offensive in Galicia, initially advancing towards Lemberg.
- July 1–3 – East St. Louis massacre: A labor dispute ignites a race riot in East St. Louis, Illinois, which leaves 250 dead.
- July 2 – WWI: Greece joins the war on the side of the Allies.
- July 6 – WWI: Battle of Aqaba: Arabian troops, led by T. E. Lawrence, capture Aqaba from the Ottoman Empire.
- July 7 – The Lions Clubs International is formed in the United States.
- July 8–13 – WWI: First Battle of Ramadi – British troops fail to take Ramadi from the Ottoman Empire; a majority of British casualties are due to extreme heat.
- July 16–17 – Russian troops mutiny, abandon the Austrian front, and retreat to Ukraine; hundreds are shot by their commanding officers during the retreat.
- July 16–18 – July Days: Serious clashes occur in Petrograd; Vladimir Lenin escapes to Finland; Leon Trotsky is arrested.
- July 17 – King George V of the United Kingdom issues a proclamation, stating that thenceforth the male line descendants of the British royal family will bear the surname Windsor, vice the Germanic bloodline of House of Saxe-Coburg and Gotha (an offshoot of the historic (800+ years) House of Wettin).
- July 20
  - The Parliament of Finland, with a Social Democratic majority, passes a "Sovereignty Act", declaring itself sovereign over the Grand Duchy of Finland. The Russian Provisional Government does not recognize the act.
  - (July 7, O.S.) – Alexander Kerensky becomes premier of the Russian Provisional Government, replacing Prince Georgy Lvov.
  - The Russian Provisional Government enacts women's suffrage.
  - The Corfu Declaration, which enables the establishment of the post-war Kingdom of Yugoslavia, is signed by the Yugoslav Committee and the Kingdom of Serbia.
- July 20–28 – WWI: Austrian and German forces repulse the Russian advance into Galicia.
- July 28 – The Silent Parade is organized by the NAACP in New York City, to protest the East St. Louis massacre of early July, as well as lynchings in Tennessee and Texas.
- July 30 – The Parliament of Finland is dissolved by the Russian Provisional Government. New elections are held in the autumn, resulting in a bourgeois majority.
- July 31 – WWI: Battle of Passchendaele ("Third Battle of Ypres") – Allied offensive operations commence in Flanders.

=== August ===
- August 2 – Squadron Commander E.H. Dunning lands his aircraft on the ship HMS Furious in Scapa Flow, Orkney. He is killed 5 days later during another landing on the ship.
- August 3 – The New York Guard is founded.
- August 10 – A general strike begins in Spain; it is smashed after 3 days with 70 left dead, hundreds of wounded and 2,000 arrests.
- August 14 – The Republic of China declares war on Germany and Austria-Hungary.
- August 17 – One of English literature's important meetings takes place, when Wilfred Owen introduces himself to Siegfried Sassoon at the Craiglockhart War Hospital in Edinburgh.
- August 18 – The Great Thessaloniki Fire of 1917 in Greece destroys 32% of the city, leaving 70,000 individuals homeless.
- August 29 – WWI: The Military Service Act is passed in the House of Commons of Canada, giving the Government of Canada the right to conscript men into the army.

=== September ===
- September 5 – WW1: On the Eastern Front, German troops enter Riga after a successful offensive against the city's Russian defenders.
- September 11 – The Bellevue Conference is held.
- September 14 (September 1 Old Style) – Russia is declared a republic by the Provisional Government.
- September 23 – Leon Trotsky is elected Chairman of the Petrograd Soviet.
- September 25 – The Mossovet (Moscow Soviet of People's Deputies) votes to side with the Bolsheviks.
- September 26–October 3 – WWI: Battle of Polygon Wood (part of the Battle of Passchendaele) near Ypres in Belgium – British and Australian troops capture positions from the Germans.
- September 28–29 – WWI: Second Battle of Ramadi – British troops take Ramadi from the Ottoman Empire.

=== October ===
- October 4 – WWI: Battle of Broodseinde near Ypres – British Imperial forces overpower the German 4th Army's defences.
- October 12 – WWI: First Battle of Passchendaele: – Allies fail to take a German defensive position, with the biggest loss of life in a single day for New Zealand, over 800 men and 45 officers are killed, roughly 1 in 1,000 of the nation's population at this time.
- October 12–19 – WWI: Operation Albion – German forces land on and capture the West Estonian archipelago.
- October 13 – The Miracle of the Sun is reported at Fátima, Portugal.
- October 19
  - Dallas Love Field Airport is opened in Texas.
  - Carl Swartz leaves office as Prime Minister of Sweden, after dismal election results for the right-wing in the Riksdag elections in September. He is replaced by liberal leader and history professor Nils Edén.
- October 23 – A Brazilian ship is destroyed by a German U-boat, encouraging Brazil to enter World War I.
- October 24 – WWI: Battle of Caporetto opens between the Kingdom of Italy and the Central Powers near Kobarid in the Austrian Littoral. It is the first major engagement for junior German officer Erwin Rommel.
- October 26 – WWI: Brazil declares war against the Central Powers.

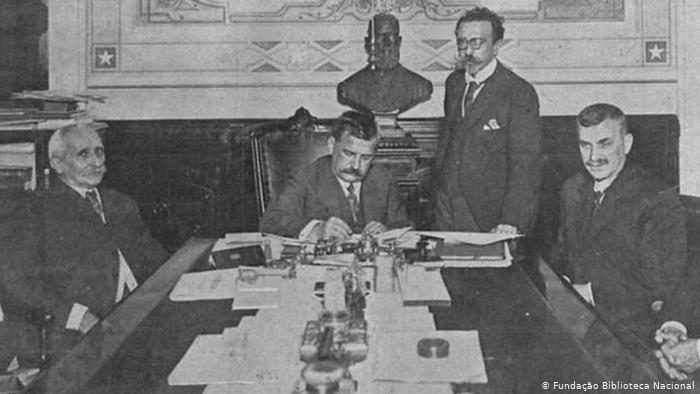
Brazilian President Venceslau Brás signs a declaration of war against the Central Powers

- October 27 – WWI: Battle of Buqqar Ridge – Ottoman forces attack British Desert Mounted Corps units garrisoning El-Buqqar Ridge, during the last days of the Stalemate in Southern Palestine.
- October 31 – WWI: Battle of Beersheba – The British XX Corps and Desert Mounted Corps (Egyptian Expeditionary Force) attack and capture Beersheba from Ottoman forces, ending the stalemate in Southern Palestine. The battle includes a rare (by this date) mounted charge, by Australian mounted infantry.

=== November ===
- November 1 – WWI:
  - The British XXI Corps of the Egyptian Expeditionary Force begins the Third Battle of Gaza.
  - The British Desert Mounted Corps begins the Battle of Tel el Khuweilfe, in the direction of Hebron and Jerusalem.
- November 2 – Zionism: The British Foreign Secretary Arthur Balfour makes the Balfour Declaration, proclaiming British support for the "establishment in Palestine of a national home for the Jewish people..., it being clearly understood that nothing shall be done which may prejudice the civil and religious rights of existing non-Jewish communities".
- November 5 (N.S.) (October 23, O.S.) – Estonian and Russian Bolsheviks seize power in Tallinn, Autonomous Governorate of Estonia, two days before the October Revolution in Petrograd.
- November 6
  - WWI – Second Battle of Passchendaele: After 3 months of fierce fighting, Canadian forces take Passchendaele in Belgium (the battle concludes on November 10).
  - WWI: The Battle of Hareira and Sheria is launched by the British XX Corps and Desert Mounted Corps, against the central Ottoman defences protecting the Gaza to Beersheba Road.
  - Militants from Trotsky's committee join with trusty Bolshevik soldiers, to seize government buildings and pounce on members of the provisional government.
- November 7
  - (N.S.) (October 25, O.S.) – October Revolution in Russia: The workers of the Petrograd Soviet in Russia, led by the Bolshevik Party and leader Vladimir Lenin, storm the Winter Palace and successfully destroy the Kerensky Provisional Government after less than eight months of rule. This immediately triggers the Russian Civil War.
  - Iran (which has provided weapons for Russia) refuses to support the Allied Forces after the October Revolution.
  - WWI – Third Battle of Gaza: The British Army XXI Corps occupies Gaza, after the Ottoman garrison withdraws.
  - WWI: The Battle of Hareira and Sheria continues, when the XX Corps and Desert Mounted Corps capture Hareira and Sheria, marking the end of the Ottoman Gaza to Beersheba line.
  - Women's Suffrage in the United States: Women win the right to vote in New York State.
- November 8 (N.S.) (October 26, O.S.) – Following the October Revolution, Alexandra Kollontai is appointed People's Commissar for Social Welfare in the Council of People's Commissars of the Government of the Russian Soviet Federative Socialist Republic, the first woman cabinet minister in Europe.
- November 13 – WWI:
  - Battle of Mughar Ridge: The British Imperial Egyptian Expeditionary Force attacks retreating Ottoman-German Yildirim Army Group forces, resulting in the capture of 10,000 Ottoman prisoners, 100 guns and 50 miles (80 km) of Palestine territory.
  - The ANZAC Mounted Division (Desert Mounted Corps) successfully fights the Battle of Ayun Kara, in the aftermath of the Battle of Mughar Ridge against strong German rearguards.
- November 15
  - "Night of Terror" in the United States: Influential suffragettes from the Silent Sentinels are deliberately subjected to physical assaults by guards while imprisoned.
  - The Parliament of Finland passes another "Sovereignty Act", dissolving Russian sovereignty over Finland and effectively declaring Finland independent.
  - (N.S.) (November 2, O.S.) – The Provincial Assembly of the Autonomous Governorate of Estonia declares itself the highest legal body in Estonia, in opposition to Bolsheviks.
- November 16
  - WWI: Battle of Ayun Kara: The ANZAC Mounted Division occupies Jaffa.
  - Georges Clemenceau becomes prime minister of France.
- November 17
  - WWI: Action of 17 November 1917: United States Navy destroyers USS Fanning and USS Nicholson capture Imperial German Navy U-boat SM U-58 off the south-west coast of Ireland, the first combat action in which U.S. ships take a submarine (which is then scuttled).
  - WWI: The Battle of Jerusalem (1917) begins, with the British Imperial Egyptian Expeditionary Force launching attacks against Ottoman forces in the Judean Hills.
  - The People's Dispensary for Sick Animals is founded in the United Kingdom.
- November 19 – WWI: Battle of Caporetto ends with Austrian and German forces driving the Italian army to retreat 150 kilometres south to the Piave river. The Italians lose 13,000 killed, 30,000 wounded, around 270,000 taken prisoner (mostly willingly) and 50,000 deserted; the government of Paolo Boselli collapses on November 29.
- November 20
  - WWI: Battle of Cambrai – British forces, using tanks, make early progress in an attack on German positions, but are soon beaten back.
  - Ukraine is declared a republic.
- November 22 – In Montreal, Quebec, Canada, the National Hockey Association suspends operations.
- November 23 – The Bolsheviks release the full text of the previously secret Sykes–Picot Agreement of 1916 in Izvestia and Pravda; it is printed in the Manchester Guardian on November 26.
- November 24 – A bomb kills 9 members of the Milwaukee Police Department, the most deaths in a single event in U.S. police history (until the September 11 attacks in 2001).
- November 25 – WWI: Battle of Ngomano – German forces defeat a Portuguese army of about 1,200 at Negomano, on the border of modern-day Mozambique and Tanzania.
- November 26 – The National Hockey League is formed in Montreal, as a replacement for the recently disbanded National Hockey Association.
- November 28 – WWI: The Bolsheviks offer peace terms to the Germans.

=== December ===
- December – Annie Besant becomes president of the Indian National Congress.
- December 3 – After nearly 20 years of planning and construction, the Quebec Bridge opens to traffic (the bridge partially collapsed on August 29, 1907 and September 11, 1916).

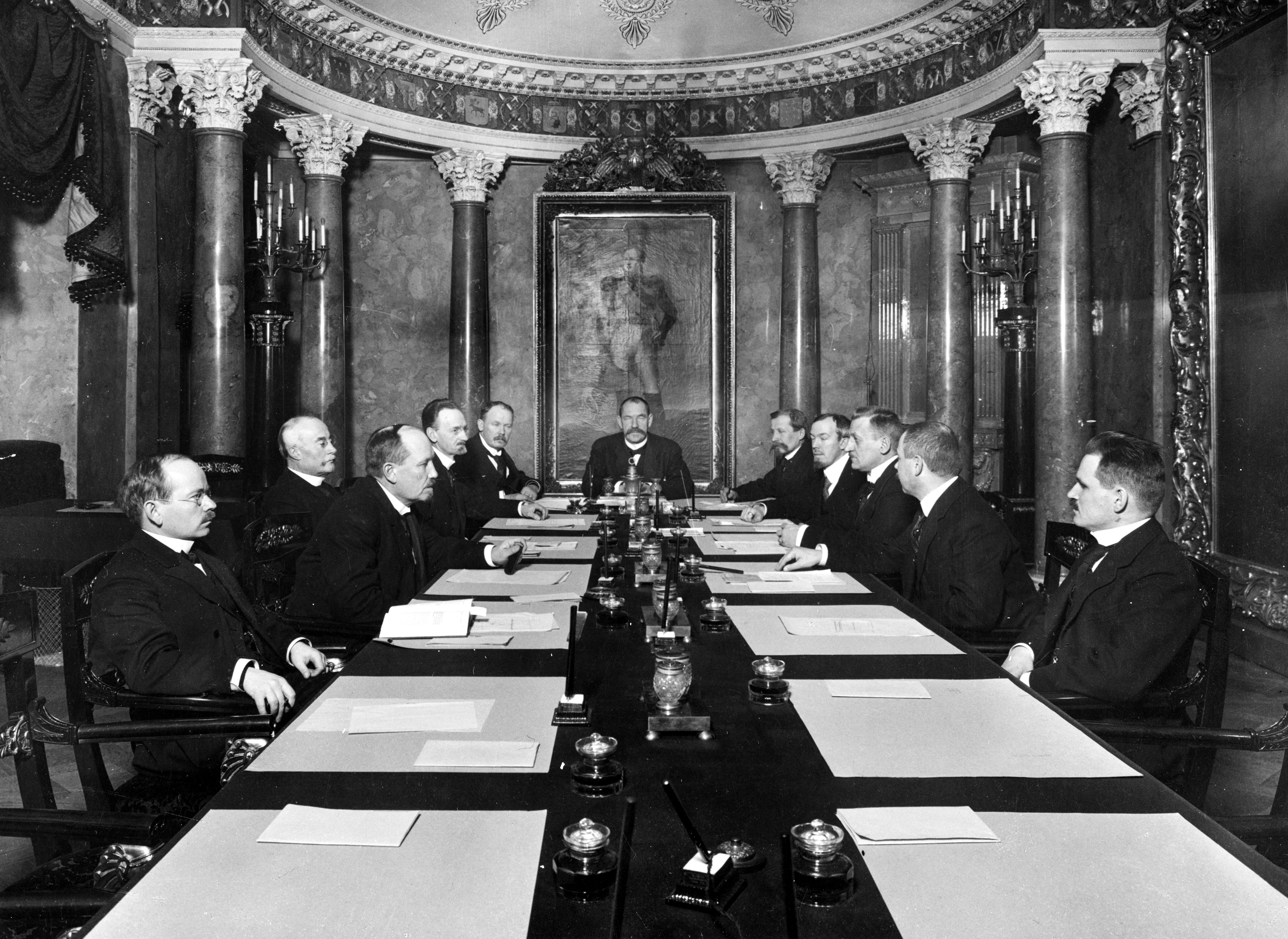
The Senate of Finland in 1917

- December 6
  - The Senate of Finland officially declares the country's independence from Russia.
  - Halifax Explosion: Two freighters collide in Halifax Harbour at Halifax, Nova Scotia, and cause a huge explosion that kills at least 1,963 people, injures 9,000 and destroys part of the city (the biggest man-made explosion in recorded history until the Trinity nuclear test in 1945).
  - WWI: U.S. Navy destroyer USS Jacob Jones is torpedoed and sunk in the Atlantic Ocean south west of the British Isles by German submarine U-53, killing 66 crew in the first significant American naval loss of the war, the first ever U.S. destroyer loss to an enemy.
- December 9 – WWI:
  - Battle of Jerusalem: The British Egyptian Expeditionary Force accepts the surrender of Jerusalem by the mayor, Hussein al-Husayni, following the effective defeat of the Ottoman-German Yildirim Army Group.
  - The Kingdom of Romania signs the Armistice of Focșani with the Central Powers.
- December 11 – WWI: General Edmund Allenby leads units of the British Egyptian Expeditionary Force into Jerusalem on foot through, the Jaffa Gate.
- December 17 – The Raad van Vlaanderen proclaims the independence of Flanders from German-occupied Belgium.
- December 20 (N.S.) (December 7, O.S.) – The Cheka, a predecessor to the KGB, is established in Russia.
- December 23 (N.S.) (December 10, O.S.) – A local plebiscite supports transferring Narva and Ivangorod (Jaanilinn) from the Petrograd Governorate, to the Autonomous Governorate of Estonia.
- December 25 – Jesse Lynch Williams's Why Marry?, the first play to win a Pulitzer Prize, opens at the Astor Theatre, New York City.
- December 26 – United States President Woodrow Wilson uses the Federal Possession and Control Act to place most U.S. railroads under the United States Railroad Administration, hoping to transport troops and materials for the war effort more efficiently.
- December 30 – WWI: The British Egyptian Expeditionary Force secures the victory at the Battle of Jerusalem, by successfully defending Jerusalem from numerous counterattacks by the Ottoman-German Yildirim Army Group.

=== Date unknown ===
- The first edition of the World Book Encyclopedia – simply known as The World Book – is published by the Hanson-Roach-Fowler Company, and is one of the first American encyclopedias to cover the major areas of knowledge to a mass audience.
- The True Jesus Church is established in Beijing.

== Births ==
=== January ===
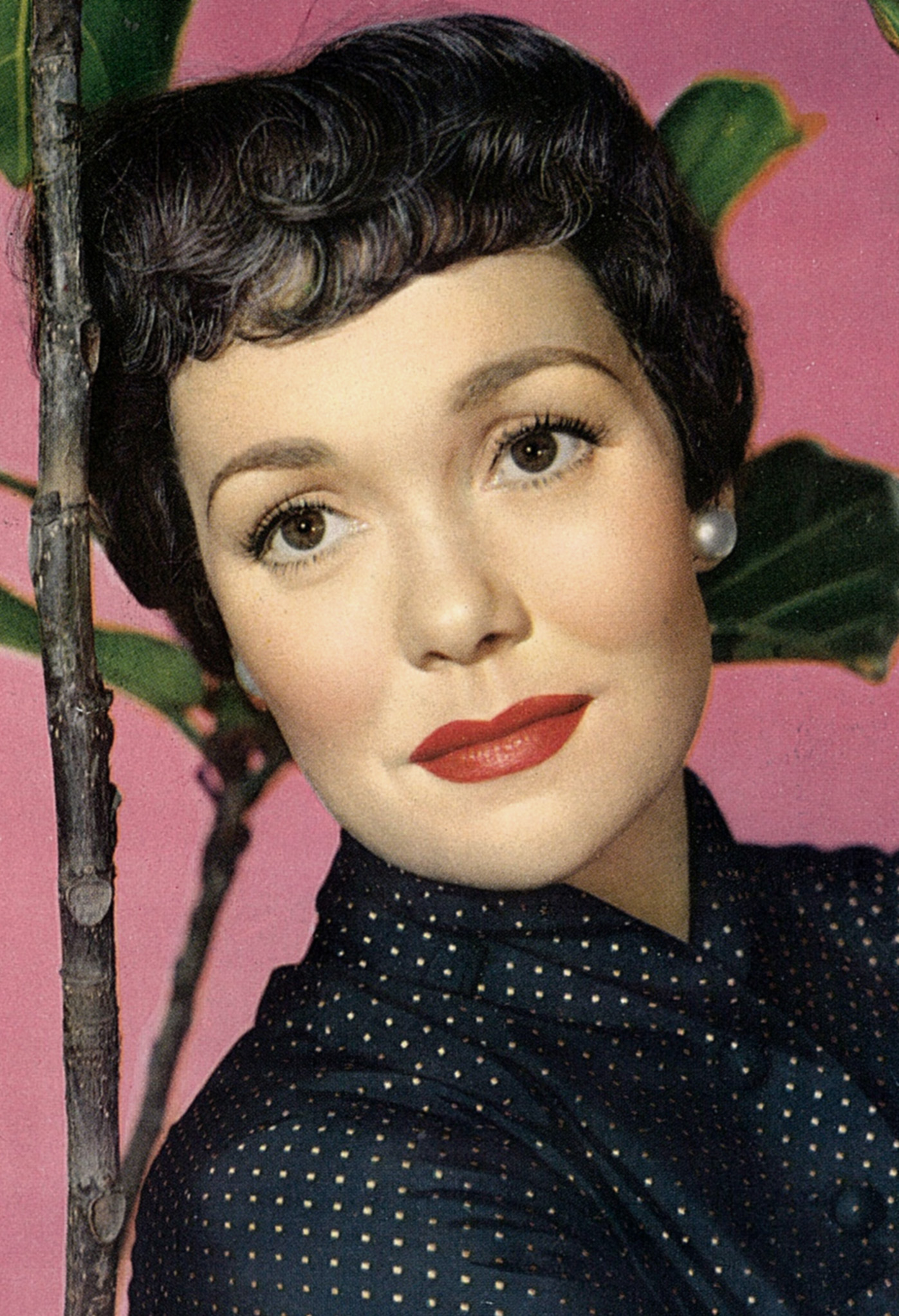
Jane Wyman

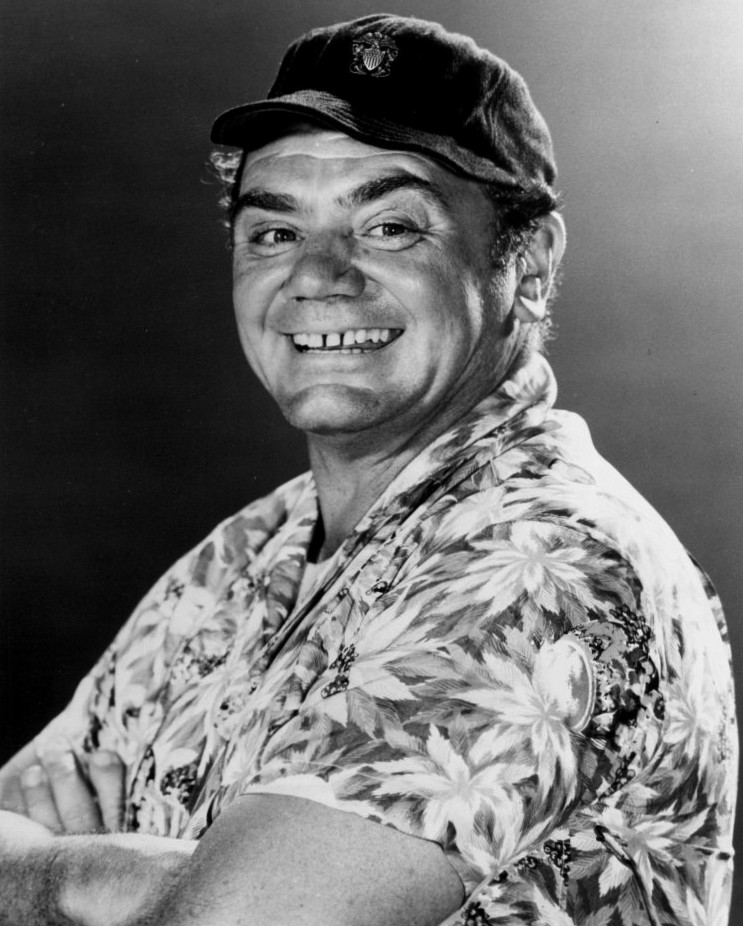
Ernest Borgnine

- January 2 – Vera Zorina, Norwegian dancer, actress (d. 2003)
- January 5
  - Adolfo Consolini, Italian discus thrower (d. 1969)
  - Lucienne Day, British textile designer (d. 2010)
  - Jane Wyman, American actress, philanthropist, and first wife of Ronald Reagan (d. 2007)
- January 10
  - Saul Cherniack, Canadian politician, lawyer (d. 2018)
  - Jerry Wexler, American record producer (d. 2008)
- January 15 – K. A. Thangavelu, Indian film actor, comedian (d. 1994)
- January 17 – M. G. Ramachandran, Indian actor and politician, chief minister of Tamil Nadu (d. 1987)
- January 24 – Ernest Borgnine, American actor (d. 2012)
- January 25
  - Ilya Prigogine, Russian-born Belgian physicist, chemist, and recipient of the Nobel Prize in Chemistry (d. 2003)
  - Jânio Quadros, 22nd President of Brazil (d. 1992)
- January 26 – Louis Zamperini, American prisoner of war, Olympic athlete, and Christian evangelist (d. 2014)

=== February ===
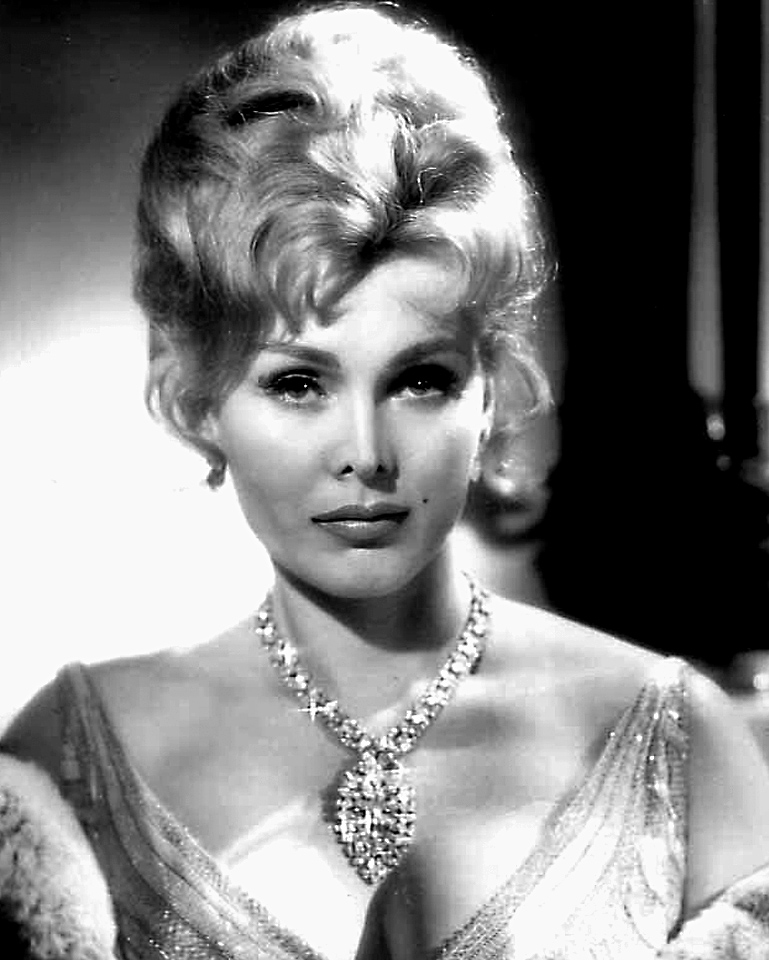
Zsa Zsa Gabor

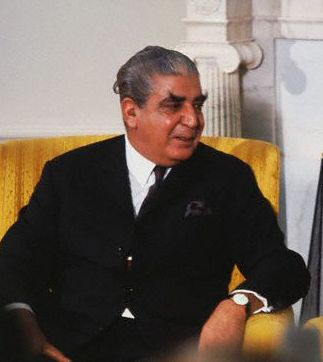
Yahya Khan

- February 2 – Đỗ Mười, Vietnamese leader (d. 2018)
- February 3 – Shlomo Goren, Polish-born Ashkenazi Chief Rabbi of Israel (d. 1994)
- February 4 – Yahya Khan, 3rd President of Pakistan (d. 1980)
- February 5 – Isuzu Yamada, Japanese actress (d. 2012)
- February 6
  - Sonny Franzese, Italian-born American mobster (d. 2020)
  - Zsa Zsa Gabor, Hungarian-born American actress (d. 2016)
- February 9 – Joseph Conombo, Prime Minister of Upper Volta (d. 2008)
- February 11 – Sidney Sheldon, American author, television writer (d. 2007)
- February 14 – Herbert A. Hauptman, American mathematician, recipient of the Nobel Prize in Chemistry (d. 2011)
- February 17 – Whang-od, Filipino mambabatok or tattoo artist
- February 19 – Carson McCullers, American author (d. 1967)
- February 21
  - Otto Kittel, German fighter ace (d. 1945)
  - Victor Marijnen, Dutch politician and Prime Minister of the Netherlands (d. 1975)
- February 23 – Abdelmunim Al-Rifai, 2-time prime minister of Jordan (d. 1985)
- February 25 – Anthony Burgess, English author (d. 1993)
- February 27 – John Connally, Governor of Texas (d. 1993)

=== March ===
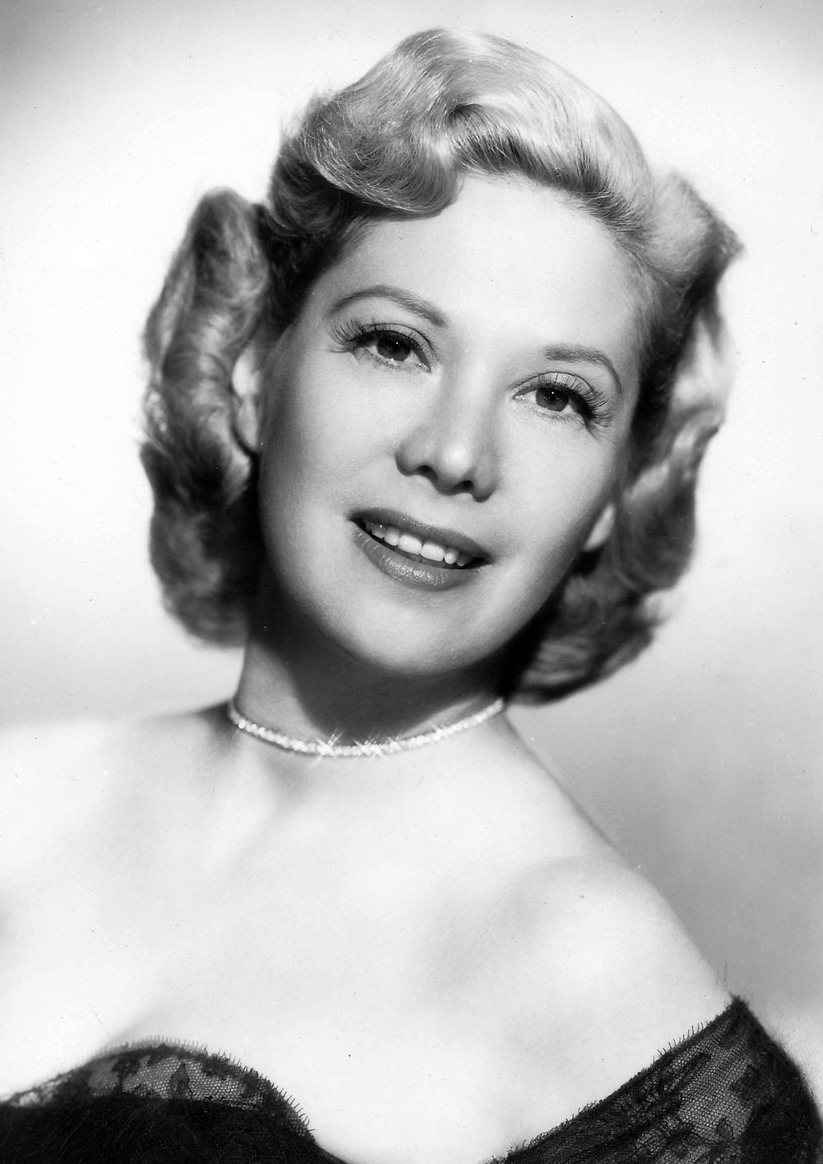
Dinah Shore

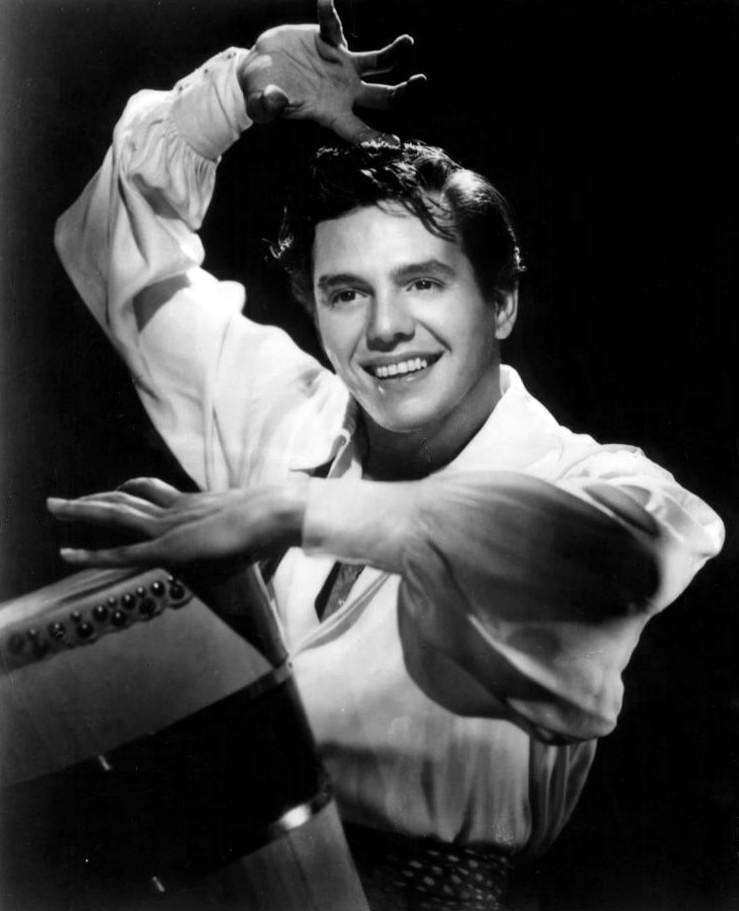
Desi Arnaz

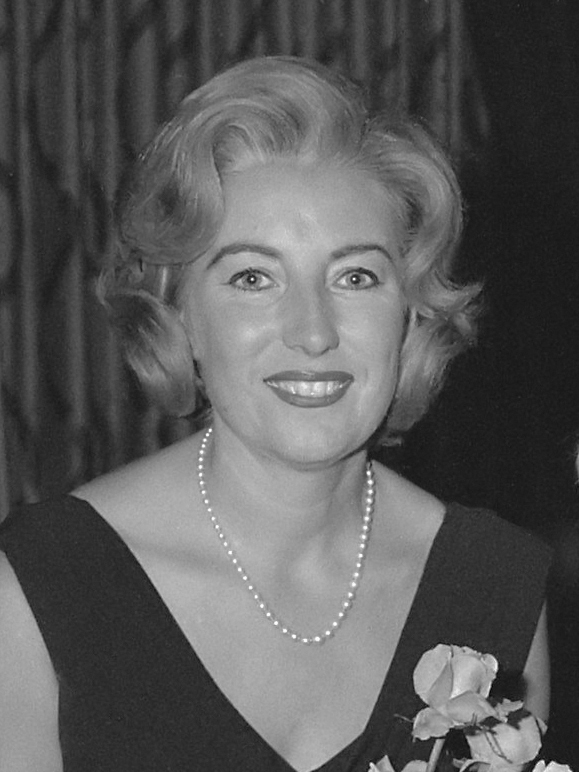
Dame Vera Lynn

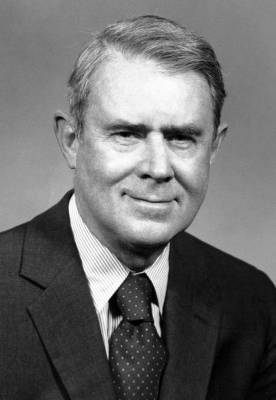
Cyrus Vance

- March 1
  - Robert Lowell, American poet (d. 1977)
  - Dinah Shore, American singer (d. 1994)
- March 2
  - Desi Arnaz, Cuban-born American actor, bandleader, musician, and television producer (d. 1986)
  - Babiker Awadalla, 8th Prime Minister of Sudan (d. 2019)
- March 3 – Sameera Moussa, Egyptian nuclear scientist (d. 1952)
- March 5 – Raymond P. Shafer, 39th Governor of Pennsylvania (d. 2006)
- March 6
  - Samael Aun Weor, Colombian writer (d. 1977)
  - Donald Davidson, American philosopher (d. 2003)
  - Will Eisner, American cartoonist (d. 2005)
- March 12
  - Leonard Chess, Polish-American record company executive, co-founder of Chess Records (d. 1969)
  - Googie Withers, British actress (d. 2011)
- March 19
  - Dinu Lipatti, Romanian pianist (d. 1950)
  - Sardon Jubir, Malaysian politician (d. 1985)
- March 20
  - Haddon Donald, New Zealand army officer and politician (d. 2018)
  - Dame Vera Lynn, English actress, singer (d. 2020)
- March 21 – Yigael Yadin, Israeli archeologist, politician, and military chief of staff (d. 1984)
- March 24
  - Constantine Andreou, Brazilian-Greek artist (d. 2007)
  - John Kendrew, British molecular biologist, recipient of the Nobel Prize in Chemistry (d. 1997)
- March 26 – Rufus Thomas, American singer (d. 2001)
- March 27 – Cyrus Vance, American politician (d. 2002)

=== April ===
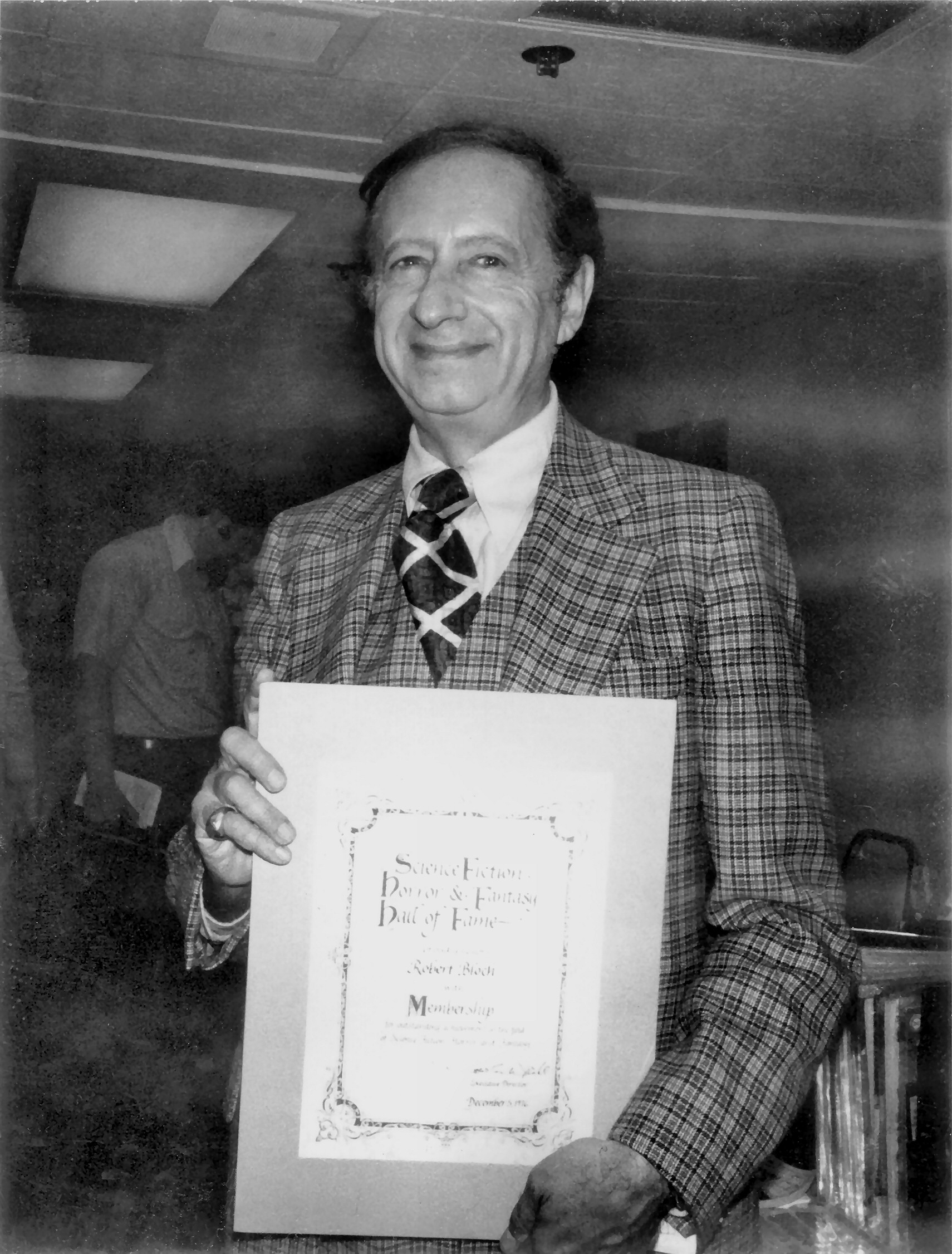
Robert Bloch

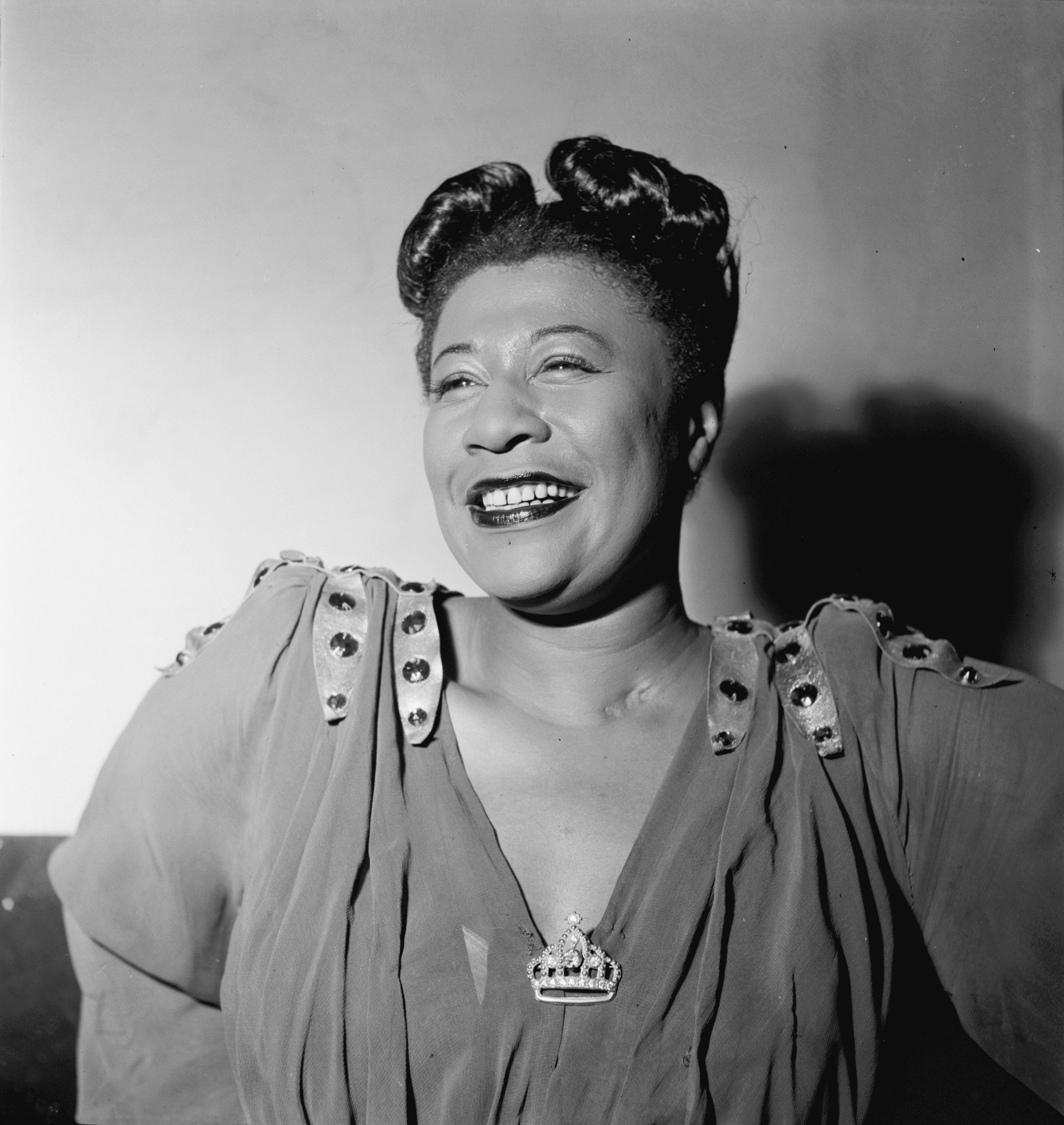
Ella Fitzgerald

- April 1 – Sydney Newman, Canadian television producer (d. 1997)
- April 5 – Robert Bloch, American writer (d. 1994)
- April 7
  - R. G. Armstrong, American actor (d. 2012)
  - Mongo Santamaría, Cuban jazz musician (d. 2003)
- April 9 – Vincent O'Brien, Irish racehorse trainer (d. 2009)
- April 10 – Robert Burns Woodward, American chemist, Nobel Prize laureate (d. 1979)
- April 12 – Džemal Bijedić, Yugoslav politician (d. 1977)
- April 13
  - Bill Clements, Governor of Texas (d. 2011)
  - Li Rui, Chinese Communist Party politician (d. 2019)
- April 14 – Valerie Hobson, British actress (d. 1998)
- April 15 – Hans Conried, American actor (d. 1982)
- April 16 – Barry Nelson, American actor (d. 2007)
- April 22 – Yvette Chauviré, French ballerina (d. 2016)
- April 23 – Dorian Leigh, American model (d. 2008)
- April 24 – Song Ping, Chinese communist revolutionary and politician (d. 2026)
- April 25 – Ella Fitzgerald, American jazz singer (d. 1996)
- April 26 – I. M. Pei, Chinese-born American architect (d. 2019)
- April 29
  - Maya Deren, Russian-born American experimental filmmaker (d. 1961)
  - Celeste Holm, American actress (d. 2012)

=== May ===
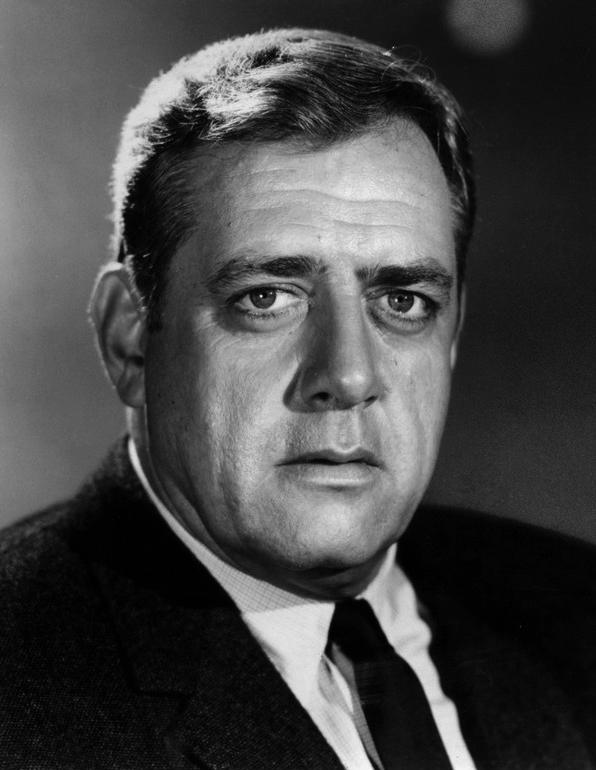
Raymond Burr

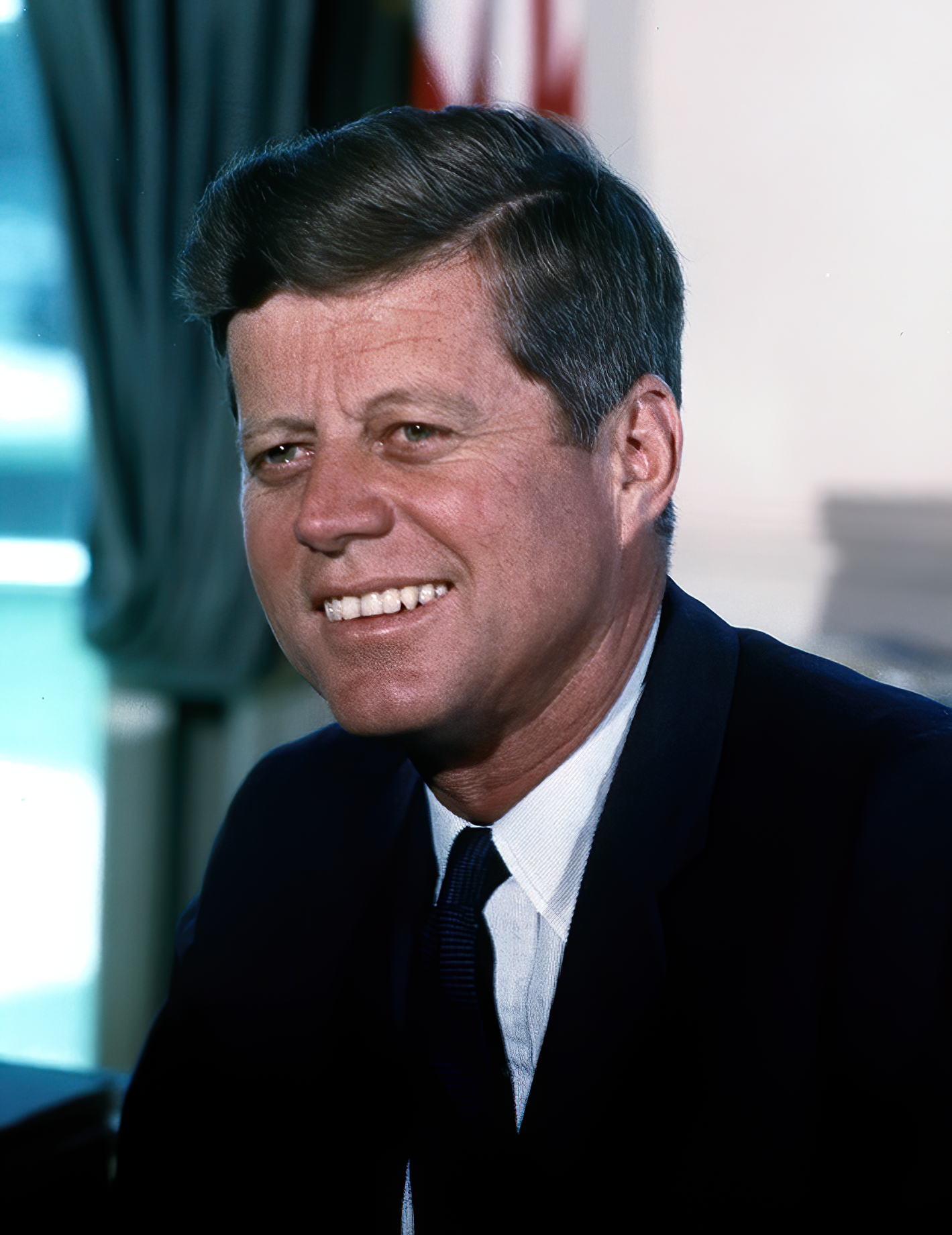
John F. Kennedy

- May 1
  - John Beradino, American baseball player and actor (d. 1996)
  - Ulric Cross, Trinidadian judge, diplomat and war hero (d. 2013)
  - Danielle Darrieux, French singer, actress (d. 2017)
  - Fyodor Khitruk, Russian animator (d. 2012)
- May 2 – Văn Tiến Dũng, Vietnamese general (d. 2002)
- May 3
  - George Gaynes, Finnish-born American actor (d. 2016)
  - Kiro Gligorov, 1st President of the Republic of Macedonia (d. 2012)
- May 7 – David Tomlinson, English actor (d. 2000)
- May 12 – Frank Clair, Canadian football coach (d. 2005)
- May 14 – Lou Harrison, American composer (d. 2003)
- May 15 – Jerzy Duszyński, Polish actor (d. 1978)
- May 16 – Juan Rulfo, Mexican writer, photographer (d. 1986)
- May 21 – Raymond Burr, Canadian actor (Perry Mason) (d. 1993)
- May 24 – Florence Knoll, American architect, furniture designer (d. 2019)
- May 29 – John F. Kennedy, 35th President of the United States (d. 1963)

=== June ===
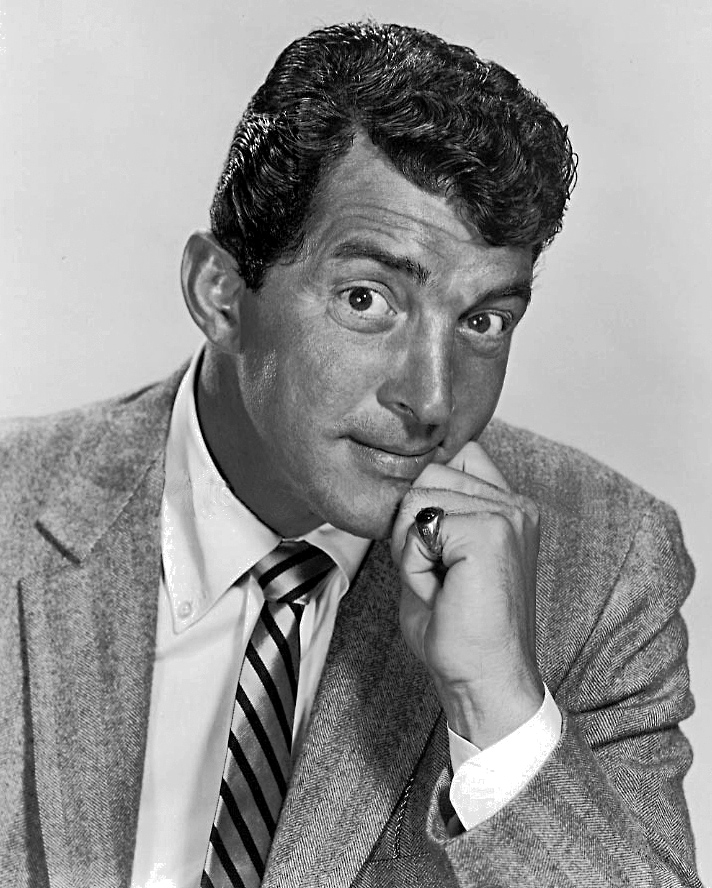
Dean Martin

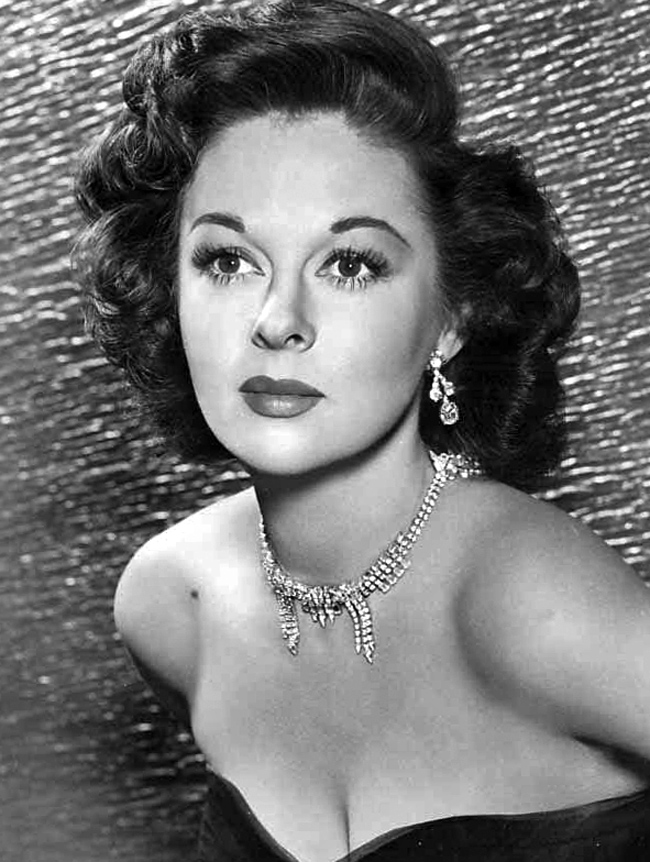
Susan Hayward

- June 1 – William Standish Knowles, American chemist, Nobel Prize laureate (d. 2012)
- June 4 – Robert Merrill, American baritone (d. 2004)
- June 6 – Kirk Kerkorian, Armenian-American businessman (d. 2015)
- June 7
  - Gwendolyn Brooks, African-American writer (d. 2000)
  - Dean Martin, American actor, singer (d. 1995)
- June 8 – Byron White, American football player and Associate Justice of the Supreme Court of the United States (d. 2002)
- June 9 – Eric Hobsbawm, Egyptian-born British historian (d. 2012)
- June 13 – Augusto Roa Bastos, Paraguayan writer (d. 2005)
- June 14 – Atle Selberg, Norwegian mathematician (d. 2007)
- June 15 – John B. Fenn, American chemist, Nobel Prize laureate (d. 2010)
- June 16
  - Phaedon Gizikis, President of Greece (d. 1999)
  - Katharine Graham, American publisher (d. 2001)
  - Irving Penn, American photographer (d. 2009)
- June 18 – Richard Boone, American actor (d. 1981)
- June 24 – Ahmad Sayyed Javadi, Iranian lawyer and politician (d. 2013)
- June 25 – Nils Karlsson, Swedish cross-country skier, Olympic champion (1948) (d. 2012)
- June 26 – Idriz Ajeti, Albanian albanologist (d. 2019)
- June 30
  - Susan Hayward, American actress (d. 1975)
  - Lena Horne, American singer, actress (d. 2010)

=== July ===
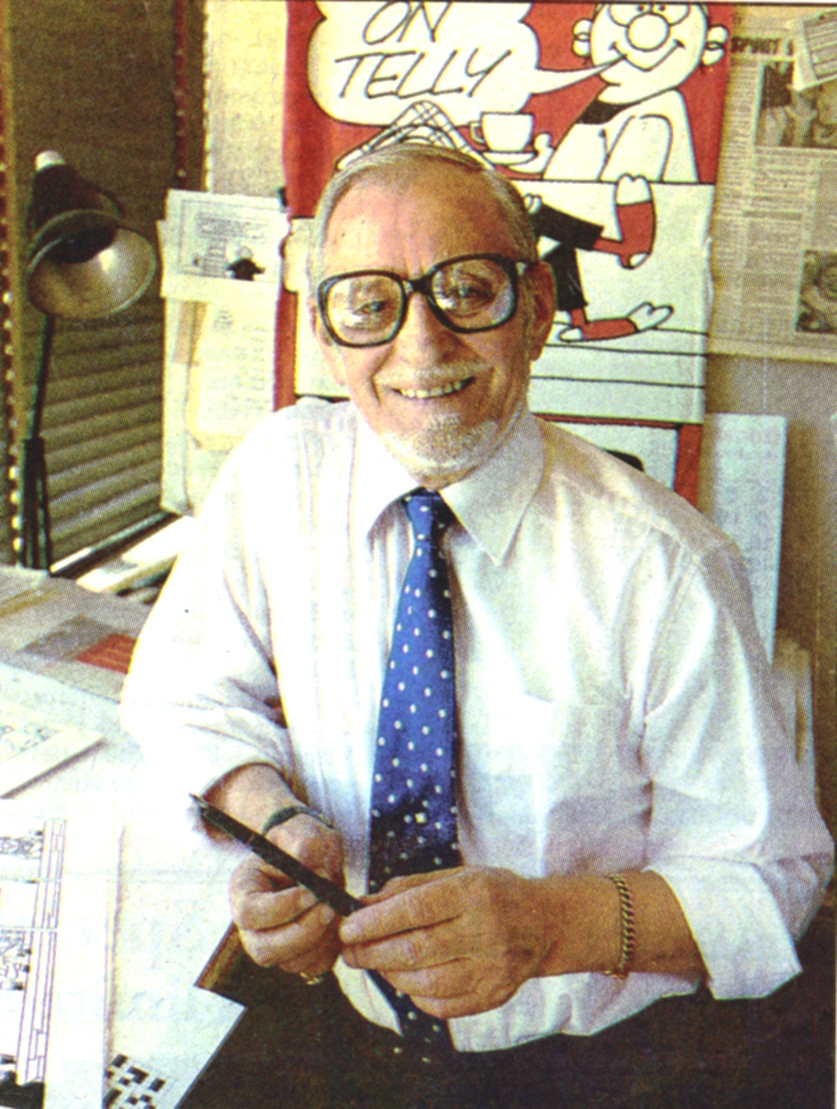
Reg Smythe

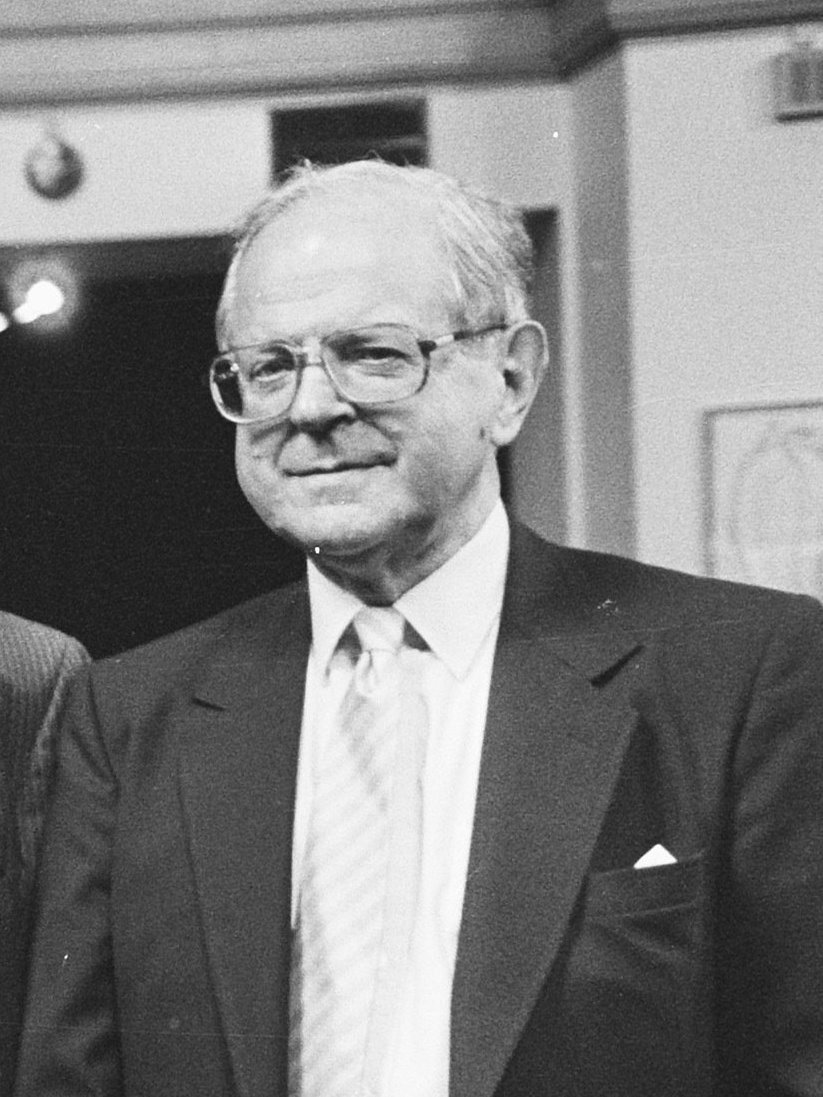
Robert Conquest

Phyllis Diller

- July 1 – Naji Talib, Prime Minister of Iraq (d. 2012)
- July 2 – Murry Wilson, American songwriter, talent manager (d. 1973)
- July 6
  - Heribert Barrera, Spanish chemist, politician (d. 2011)
  - Arthur Lydiard, New Zealand runner, athletics coach (d. 2004)
- July 7 – Fidel Sánchez Hernández, President of El Salvador (d. 2003)
- July 9 – Krystyna Dańko, Polish humanitarian, survivor of the Holocaust (d. 2019)
- July 10 – Reg Smythe, English cartoonist (d. 1998)
- July 11 – Per Carleson, Swedish épée fencer (d. 2004)
- July 12
  - Luigi Gorrini, Italian soldier, pilot (d. 2014)
  - Andrew Wyeth, American painter (d. 2009)
  - Satyendra Narayan Sinha, Indian statesman (d. 2006)
- July 15
  - Robert Conquest, British historian (d. 2015)
  - Reidar Liaklev, Norwegian speed skater (d. 2006)
- July 17
  - Phyllis Diller, American actress, comedian (d. 2012)
  - Kenan Evren, 7th President of Turkey (d. 2015)
  - Nur Muhammad Taraki, Afghan revolutionary communist politician, journalist and writer (d. 1979)
- July 18 – Paul Streeten, Austrian-born British economist (d. 2019)
- July 19 – William Scranton, American politician (d. 2013)
- July 22 – Adam Malik, Indonesian politician, 3rd Vice President of Indonesia (d. 1984)
- July 23 – Omar Yoke Lin Ong, Malaysian politician, diplomat and businessman (d. 2010)
- July 24 – Henri Betti, French composer, pianist (d. 2005)
- July 25 – Fritz Honegger, 79th president of Switzerland (d. 1999)
- July 27 – Wu Zhonghua, Chinese physicist, pioneered three-dimensional flow theory (d. 1992)

=== August ===
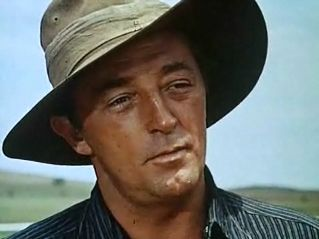
Robert Mitchum

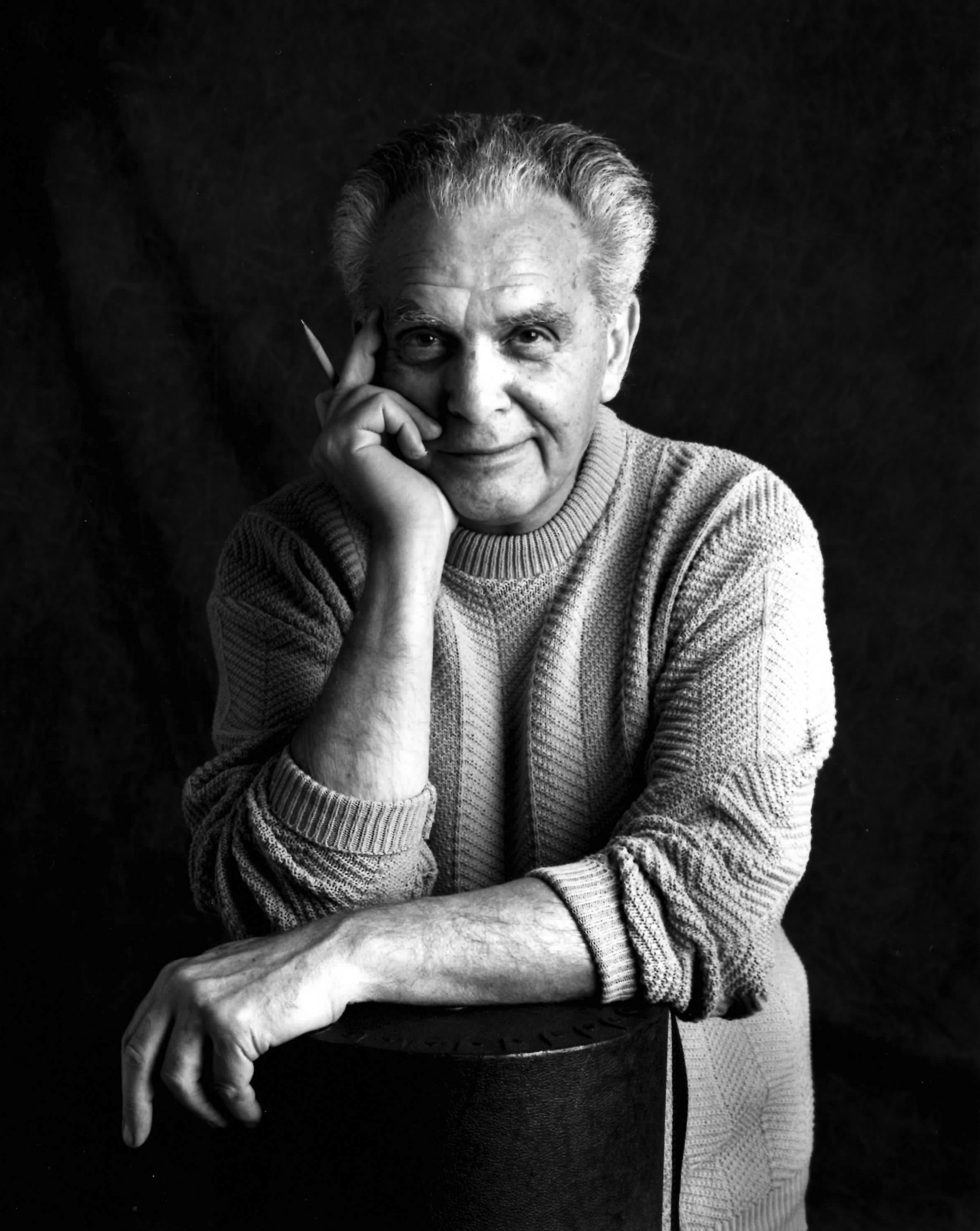
Jack Kirby

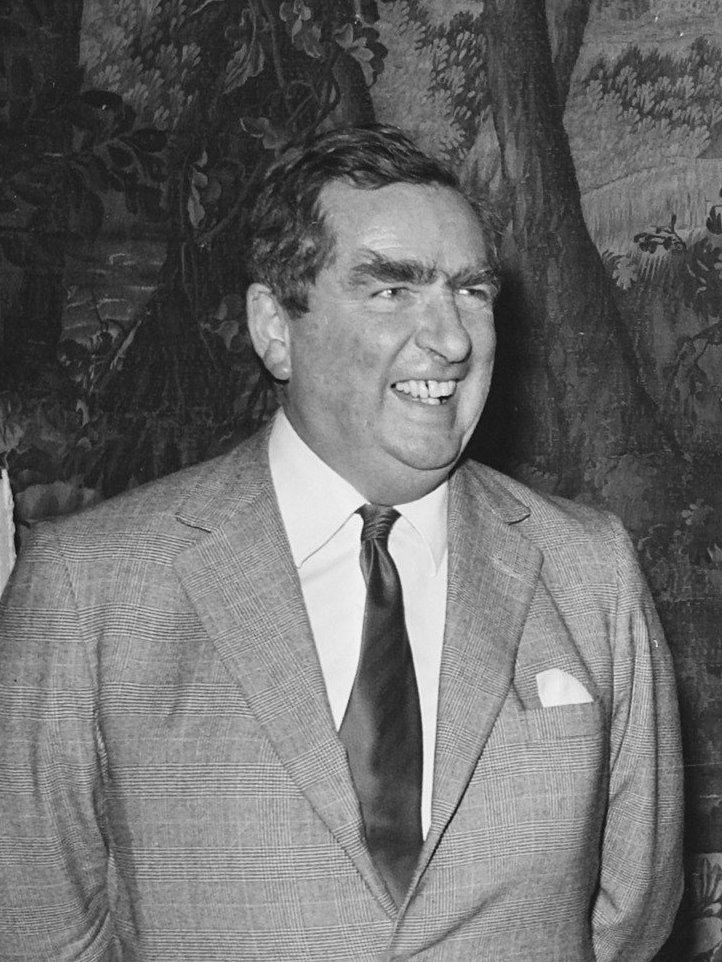
Denis Healey

- August 6 – Robert Mitchum, American actor (d. 1997)
- August 8 – Earl Cameron, Bermudian-born British actor (d. 2020)
- August 9 – Jao Tsung-I, Chinese-born Hong Kong scholar, poet, calligrapher and painter (d. 2018)
- August 11 – Vasiľ Biľak, Slovak Communist leader (d. 2014)
- August 12 – Marjorie Reynolds, American actress (d. 1997)
- August 15
  - Jack Lynch, 5th Prime Minister of Ireland (d. 1999)
  - Óscar Romero, Salvadoran Roman Catholic archbishop (d. 1980)
- August 17 – Zvi Keren, American-born Israeli pianist, musicologist and composer (d. 2008)
- August 18 – Caspar Weinberger, United States Secretary of Defense (d. 2006)
- August 21 – Esther Cooper Jackson, African-American civil rights activist (d. 2022)
- August 22 – John Lee Hooker, African-American musician (d. 2001)
- August 23
  - Hu Chengzhi, Chinese palaeontologist, palaeoanthropologist (d. 2018)
  - Miguel Alvarez del Toro, Mexican biologist (d. 1996)
- August 25
  - Mel Ferrer, Cuban-American actor, film director, producer (d. 2008)
  - Lisbeth Movin, Danish actress (d. 2011)
  - Lou van Burg, Dutch television personality, game show host (d. 1986)
- August 26 – William French Smith, 74th United States Attorney General (d. 1990)
- August 28 – Jack Kirby, American comic book artist (d. 1994)
- August 29 – Isabel Sanford, African-American actress, best known for her role in The Jeffersons (d. 2004)
- August 30
  - Denis Healey, English politician, author (d. 2015)
  - Margaret Costa, British food writer (d. 1999)

=== September ===
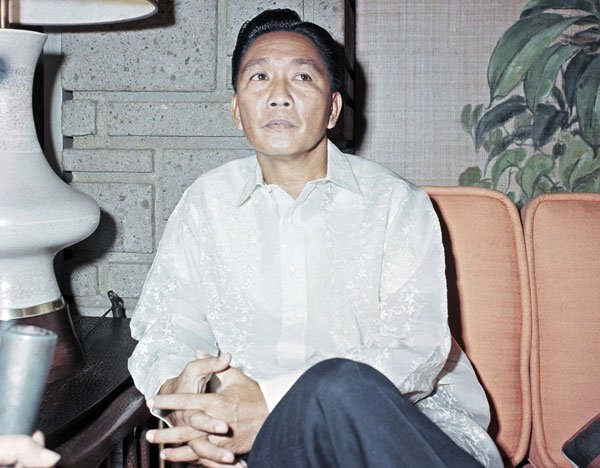
Ferdinand Marcos

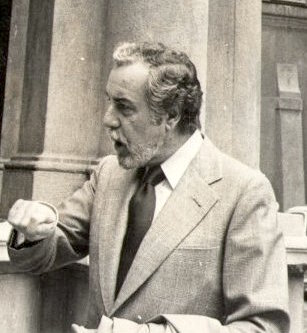
Fernando Rey

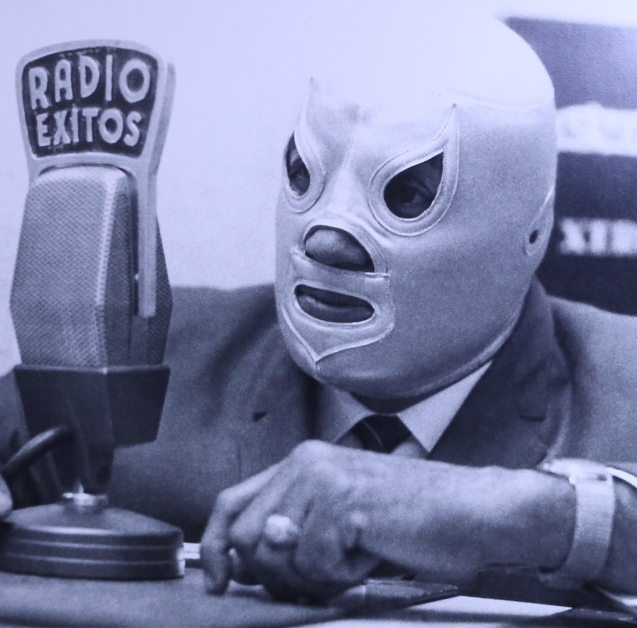
El Santo

- September 5 – Pedro E. Guerrero, American photographer (d. 2012)
- September 6 – Philipp von Boeselager, German Wehrmacht officer, failed assassin of Adolf Hitler (d. 2008)
- September 7
  - Xerardo Fernández Albor, Spanish politician and physician (d. 2018)
  - Leonard Cheshire, British war hero (d. 1992)
  - John Cornforth, Australian chemist, Nobel Prize laureate (d. 2013)
  - Tetsuo Hamuro, Japanese swimmer (d. 2005)
- September 9 – Russell Hellman, American politician and member of the Michigan House of Representatives from 1961 to 1980 (d. 2004)
- September 10 – Miguel Serrano, Chilean diplomat, explorer and journalist (d. 2009)
- September 11
  - Donald Blakeslee, American aviator (d. 2008)
  - Herbert Lom, Czech-born British actor (d. 2012)
  - Ferdinand Marcos, 10th President of the Philippines (d. 1989)
  - Jessica Mitford, Anglo-American writer (d. 1996)
  - Daniel Wildenstein, French art dealer, racehorse owner (d. 2001)
- September 17 – Henry Pearce, Australian politician (d. 1992)
- September 18 – June Foray, American voice actress (d. 2017)
- September 20
  - Red Auerbach, American basketball coach, official (d. 2006)
  - Fernando Rey, Spanish actor (d. 1994)
- September 22 – Anna Campori, Italian actress (d. 2018)
- September 23
  - Asima Chatterjee, Indian chemist (d. 2006)
  - El Santo, Mexican professional wrestler and actor (d. 1984)
- September 24 – Otto Günsche, German general (d. 2003)
- September 26 – Tran Duc Thao, Vietnamese phenomenologist and Marxist philosopher (d. 1993)
- September 28 – Wee Chong Jin, Singaporean judge (d. 2005)

=== October ===
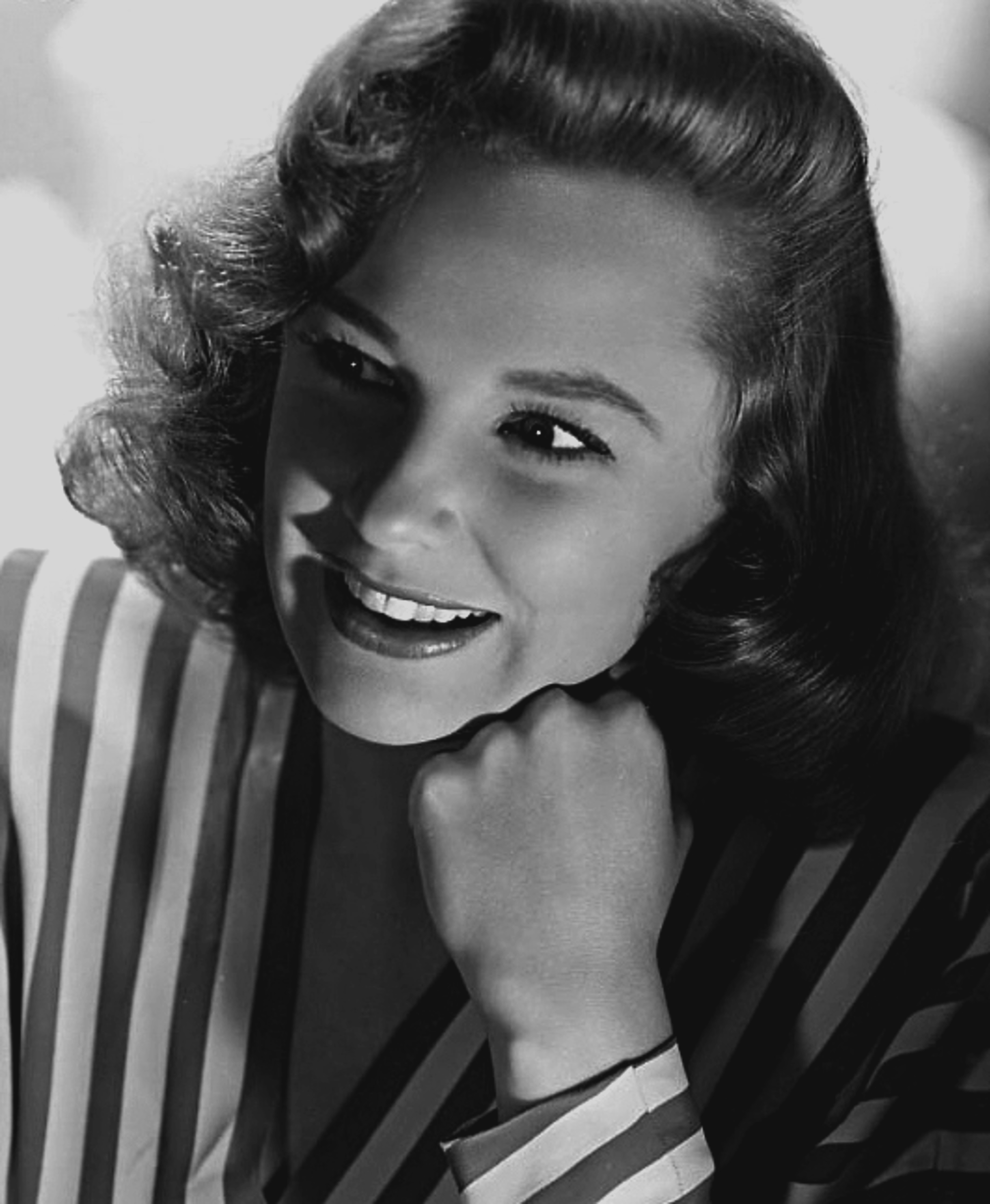
June Allyson

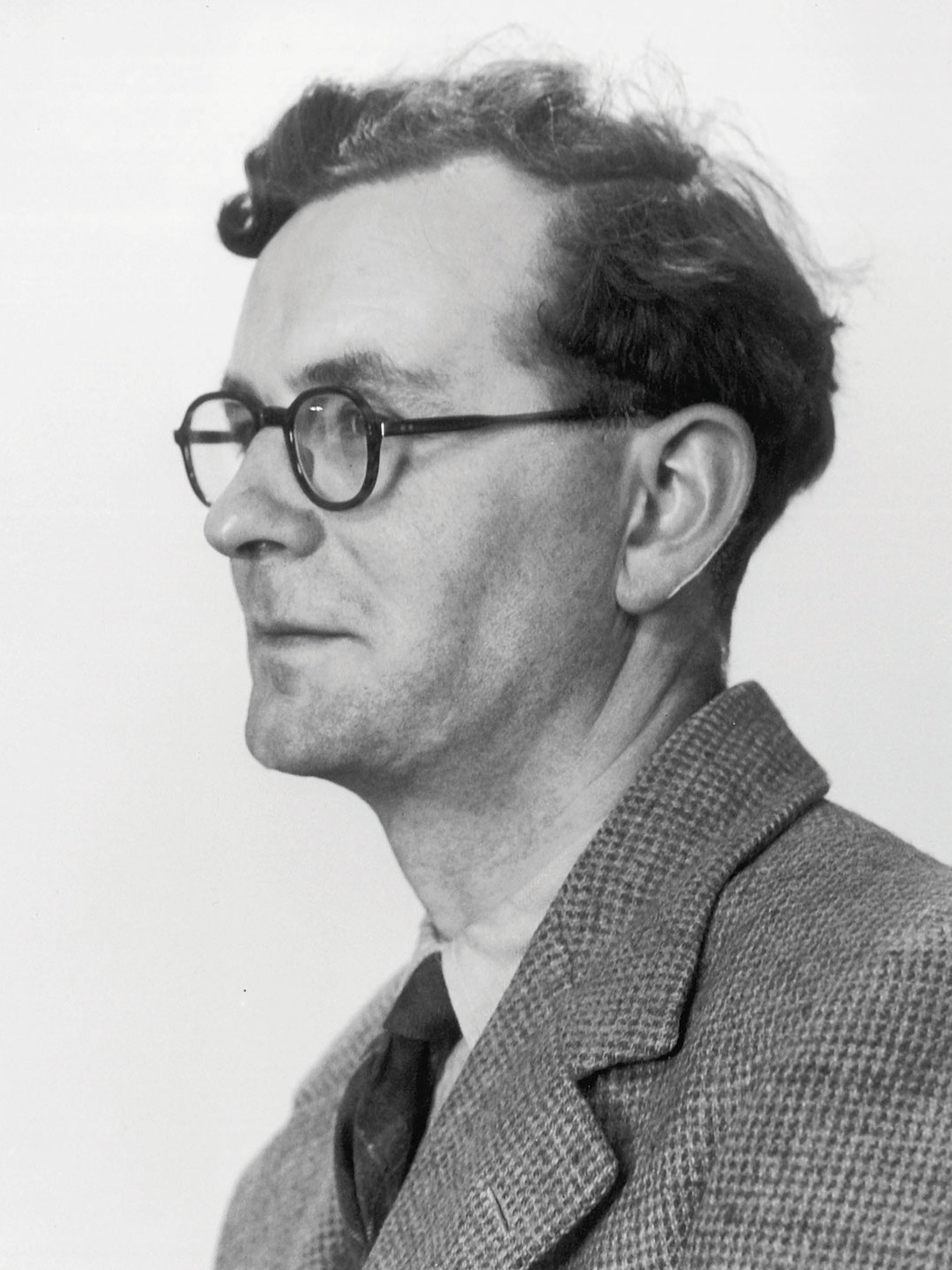
Rodney Robert Porter

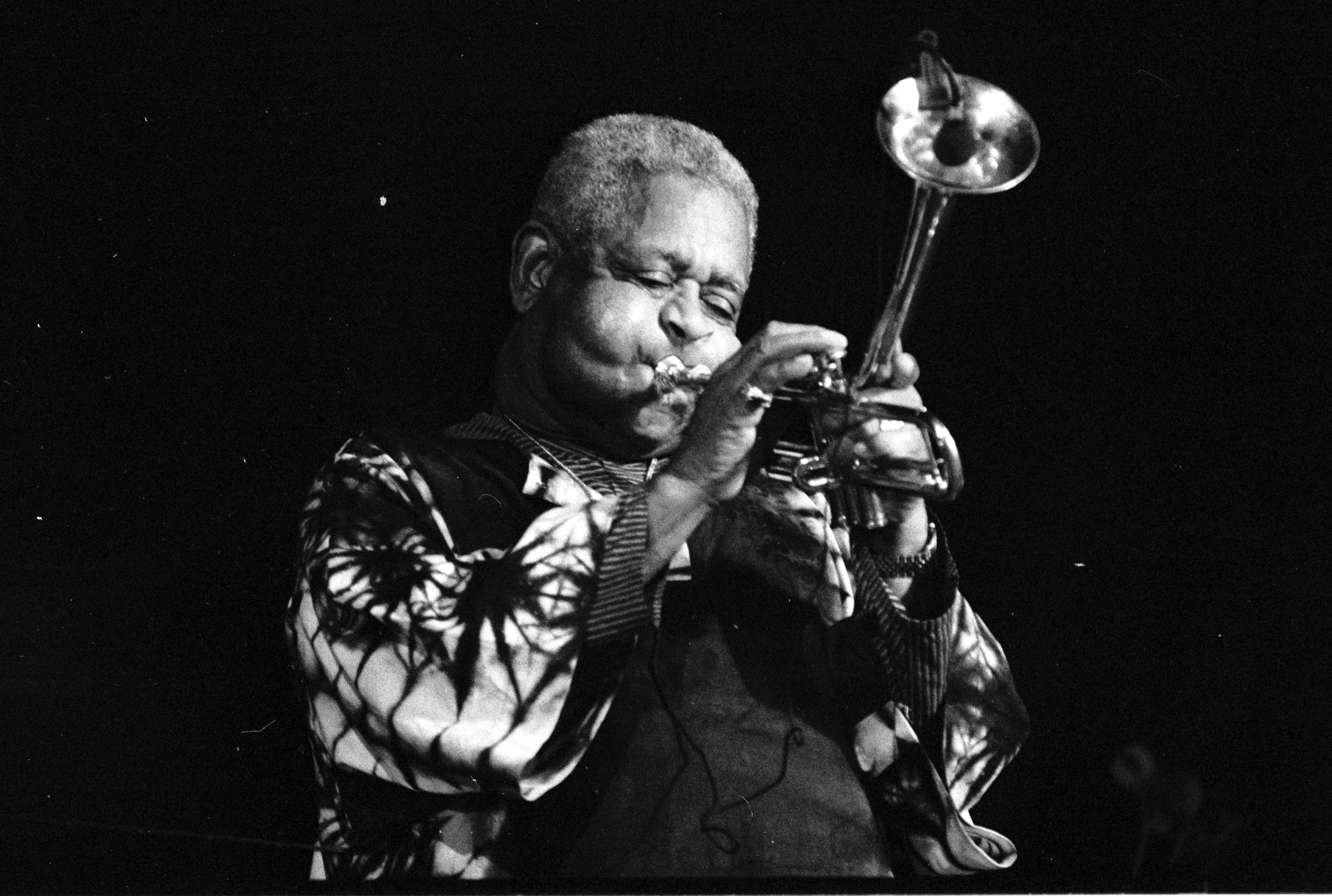
Dizzy Gillespie

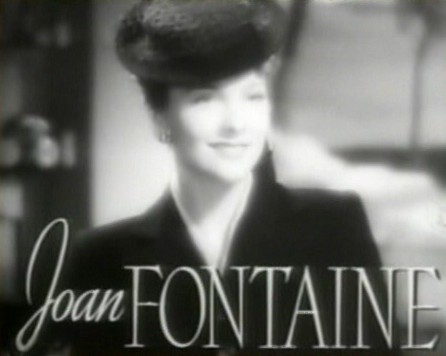
Joan Fontaine

- October 2
  - Christian de Duve, English-born biologist, recipient of the Nobel Prize in Physiology or Medicine (d. 2013)
  - Charles Drake, American actor (d. 1994)
- October 6 – Fannie Lou Hamer, African-American civil rights activist (d. 1977)
- October 7 – June Allyson, American actress (d. 2006)
- October 8 – Rodney Robert Porter, English biochemist, recipient of the Nobel Prize in Physiology or Medicine (d. 1985)
- October 10 – Thelonious Monk, African-American jazz pianist (d. 1982)
- October 15 – Arthur M. Schlesinger Jr., American historian, political commentator (d. 2007)
- October 17
  - Martin Donnelly, New Zealand cricketer (d. 1999)
  - Marsha Hunt, American actress (d. 2022)
- October 19 – Walter Munk, Austrian-born American oceanographer (d. 2019)
- October 20
  - Jean-Pierre Melville, French film director, film producer, and screenwriter (d. 1973)
  - Stéphane Hessel, French diplomat and writer (d. 2013)
  - X. M. Sellathambu, Sri Lankan Tamil politician (d. 1984)
- October 21 – Dizzy Gillespie, African-American musician (d. 1993)
- October 22 – Joan Fontaine, British-born actress (d. 2013)
- October 24 – Fang Huai, Chinese military officer and major general of PLA (d. 2019)
- October 27 – Oliver Tambo, South African activist, revolutionary (d. 1993)
- October 28
  - Shams Pahlavi, Iranian royal (d. 1996)
  - Jack Soo, Japanese-American actor (d. 1979)
- October 30
  - Paul Eberhard, Swiss bobsledder (d. 1983)
  - Maurice Trintignant, French racing driver (d. 2005)
- October 31 – Gordon Steege, Australian military officer (d. 2013)

=== November ===
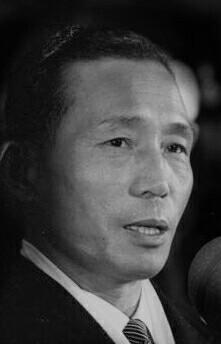
Park Chung Hee

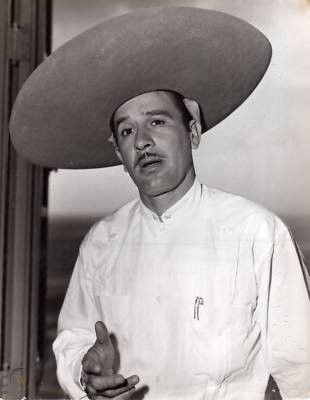
Pedro Infante

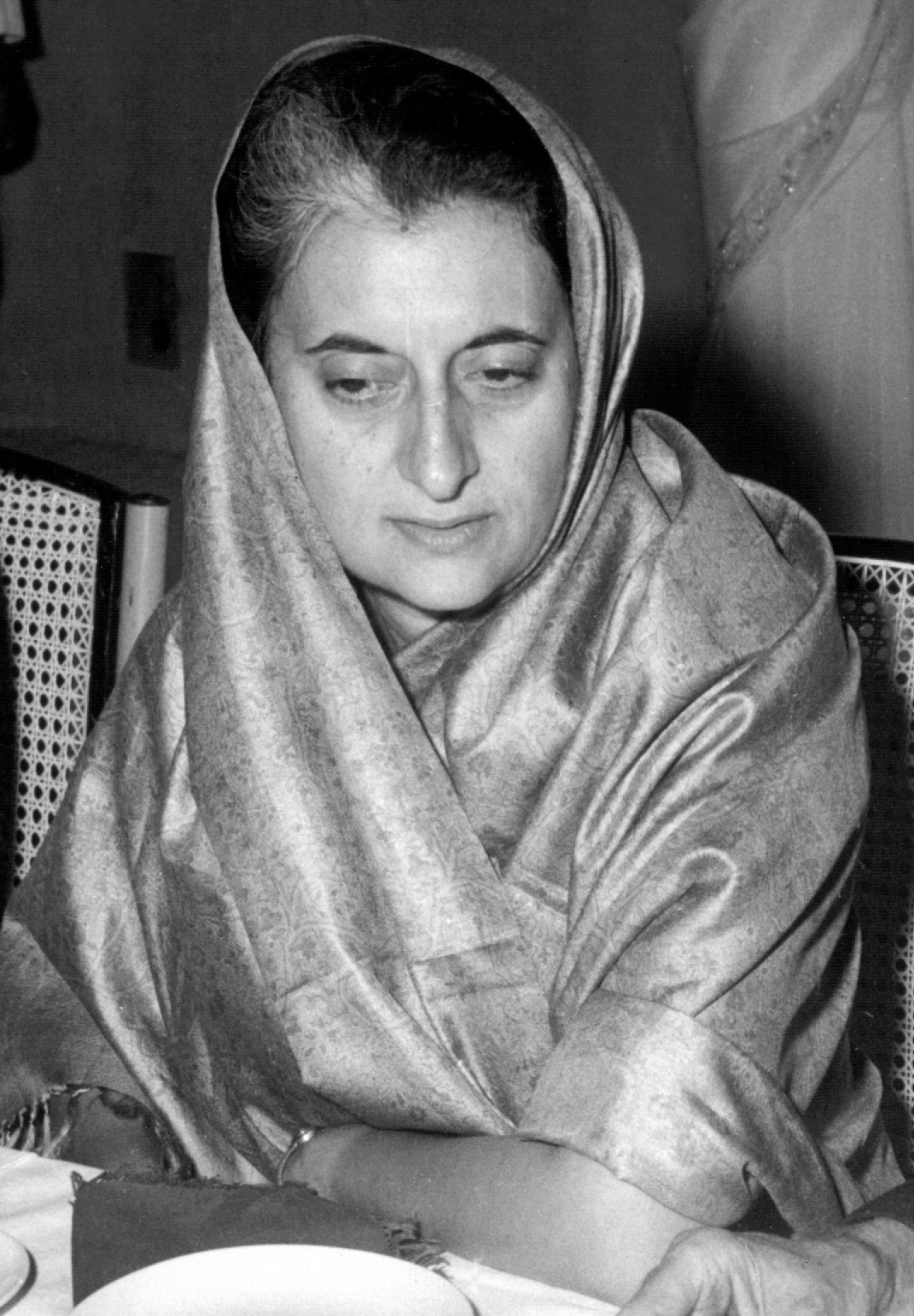
Indira Gandhi

- November 1 – Erich Rudorffer, German fighter ace (d. 2016)
- November 2
  - Durward Knowles, Bahamian sailor, Olympic champion (d. 2018)
  - Ann Rutherford, Canadian actress (d. 2012)
- November 3 – Chung Sze-yuen, Hong Kong politician (d. 2018)
- November 4 – Virginia Field, British-born actress (d. 1992)
- November 5 – Jacqueline Auriol, French aviator (d. 2000)
- November 10 – Koun Wick, Cambodian statesman and diplomat (d. 1999)
- November 11 – Madeleine Damerment, French WWII heroine (d. 1944)
- November 12
  - Hedley Jones, Jamaican musician (d. 2017)
  - Mohamed Suffian Mohamed Hashim, Malaysian judge (d. 2000)
  - Jo Stafford, American traditional pop singer (d. 2008)
- November 13 – Infanta Alicia, Duchess of Calabria, Austrian-born Spanish and Italian princess (d. 2017)
- November 14 – Park Chung Hee, 3rd president of South Korea (d. 1979)
- November 18 – Pedro Infante, Mexican actor, singer (d. 1957)
- November 19 – Indira Gandhi, Prime Minister of India (d. 1984)
- November 22 – Andrew Huxley, English scientist, recipient of the Nobel Prize in Physiology or Medicine (d. 2012)
- November 24 – Shabtai Rosenne, British-born Israeli diplomat, jurist (d. 2010)
- November 28
  - Orville Rogers, American pilot, competitive runner (d. 2019)
  - Xiang Shouzhi, Chinese general (d. 2017)
- November 29 – Pierre Gaspard-Huit, French film director, screenwriter (d. 2017)

=== December ===
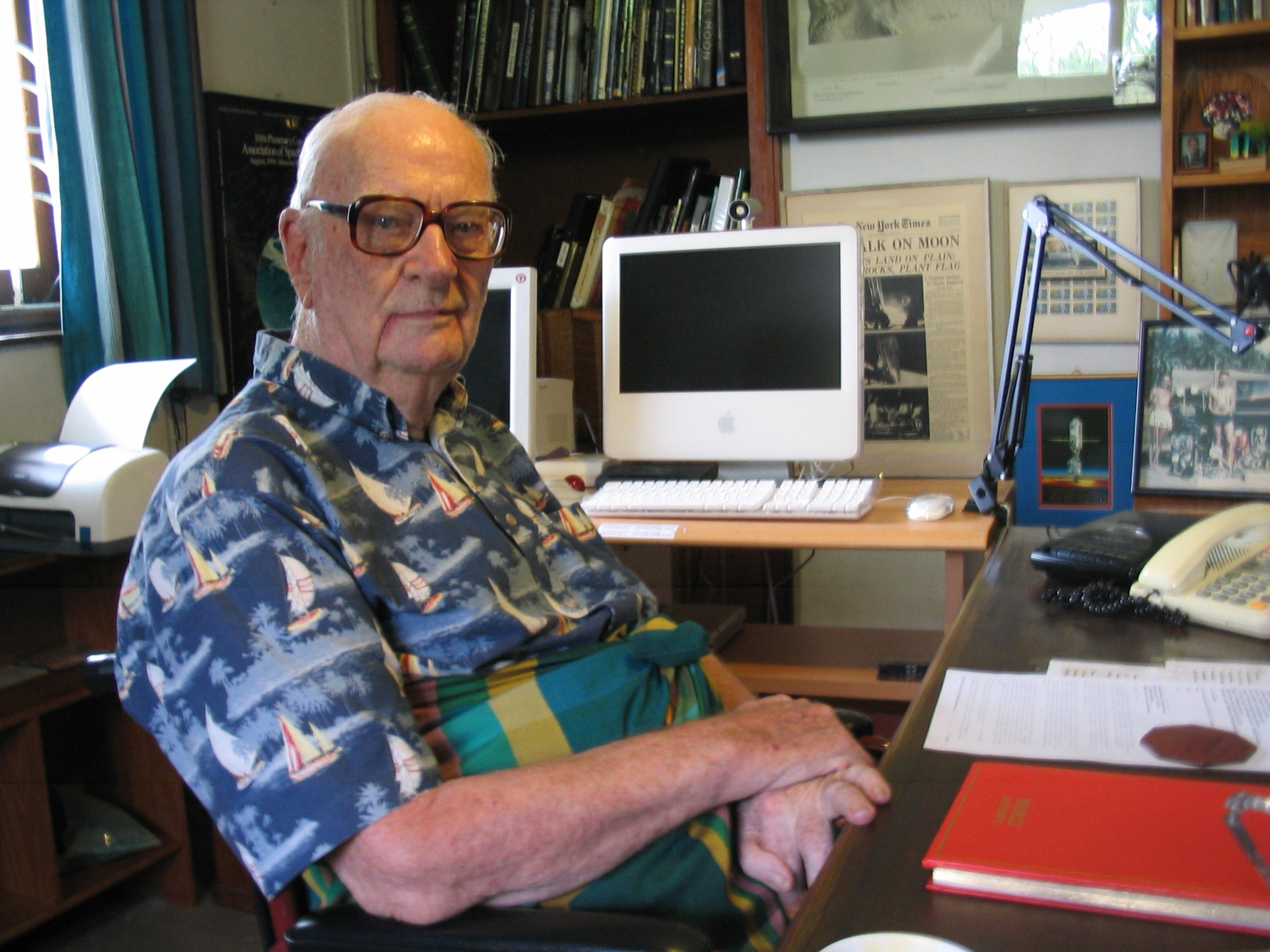
Sir Arthur C. Clarke

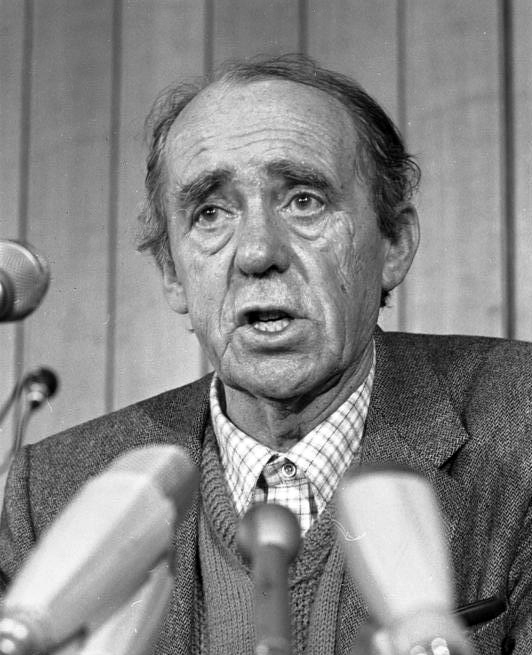
Heinrich Böll

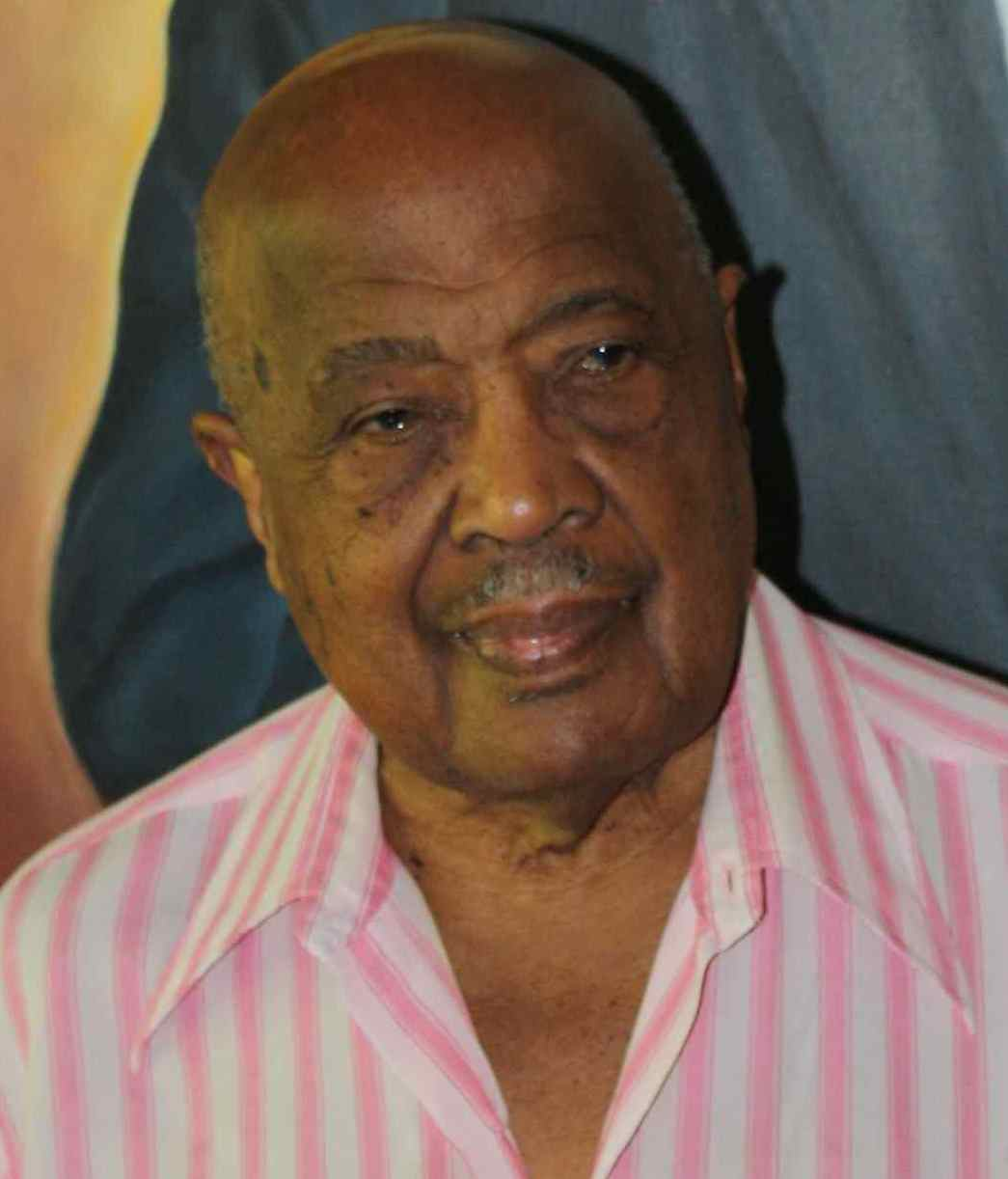
Ellis Clarke

- December 5 – Wenche Foss, Norwegian actress (d. 2011)
- December 6 – Kamal Jumblatt, leader of the Lebanese Druze (d. 1977)
- December 7 – Hurd Hatfield, American actor (d. 1998)
- December 8 – Ian Johnson, Australian cricketer (d. 1998)
- December 9 – James Rainwater, American physicist, Nobel Prize laureate (d. 1986)
- December 10 – Sultan Yahya Petra of Kelantan, King of Malaysia (d. 1979)
- December 11 – Mien Sondakh, Indonesian actress and singer (d. 1998)
- December 15 – Shan-ul-Haq Haqqee, Pakistani poet, author and lexicographer (d. 2005)
- December 16
  - Sir Arthur C. Clarke, English science-fiction author, best known for co-writing the screenplay of 2001: A Space Odyssey (d. 2008)
  - Beatrice Wright, American psychologist (d. 2018)
- December 18 – Ossie Davis, African-American actor, film director and activist (d. 2005)
- December 19 – Paul Brinegar, American actor (d. 1995)
- December 20
  - David Bohm, American-born physicist, philosopher and neuropsychologist (d. 1992)
  - Petrus Hugo, South African WWII fighter pilot (d. 1986)
  - Audrey Totter, American actress (d. 2013)
- December 21 – Heinrich Böll, German writer, Nobel Prize laureate (d. 1985)
- December 22 – Marthe Gosteli, Swiss women's suffrage campaigner (d. 2017)
- December 24 – Kim Jong-suk, wife of Kim Il-sung (d. 1949)
- December 25
  - Lincoln Verduga Loor, Ecuadorian journalist, politician (d. 2009)
  - Arseny Mironov, Russian scientist, engineer and pilot (d. 2019)
- December 28 – Ellis Clarke, 1st President of Trinidad and Tobago (d. 2010)
- December 29 – Ramanand Sagar, Indian film director (d. 2005)
- December 30 – Seymour Melman, American industrial engineer (d. 2004)
- December 31 – Suzy Delair, French actress, singer (d. 2020)

=== Date unknown ===
- Hazza' al-Majali, 22nd & 32nd Prime Minister of Jordan (d. 1960)

== Deaths ==
=== January–February ===
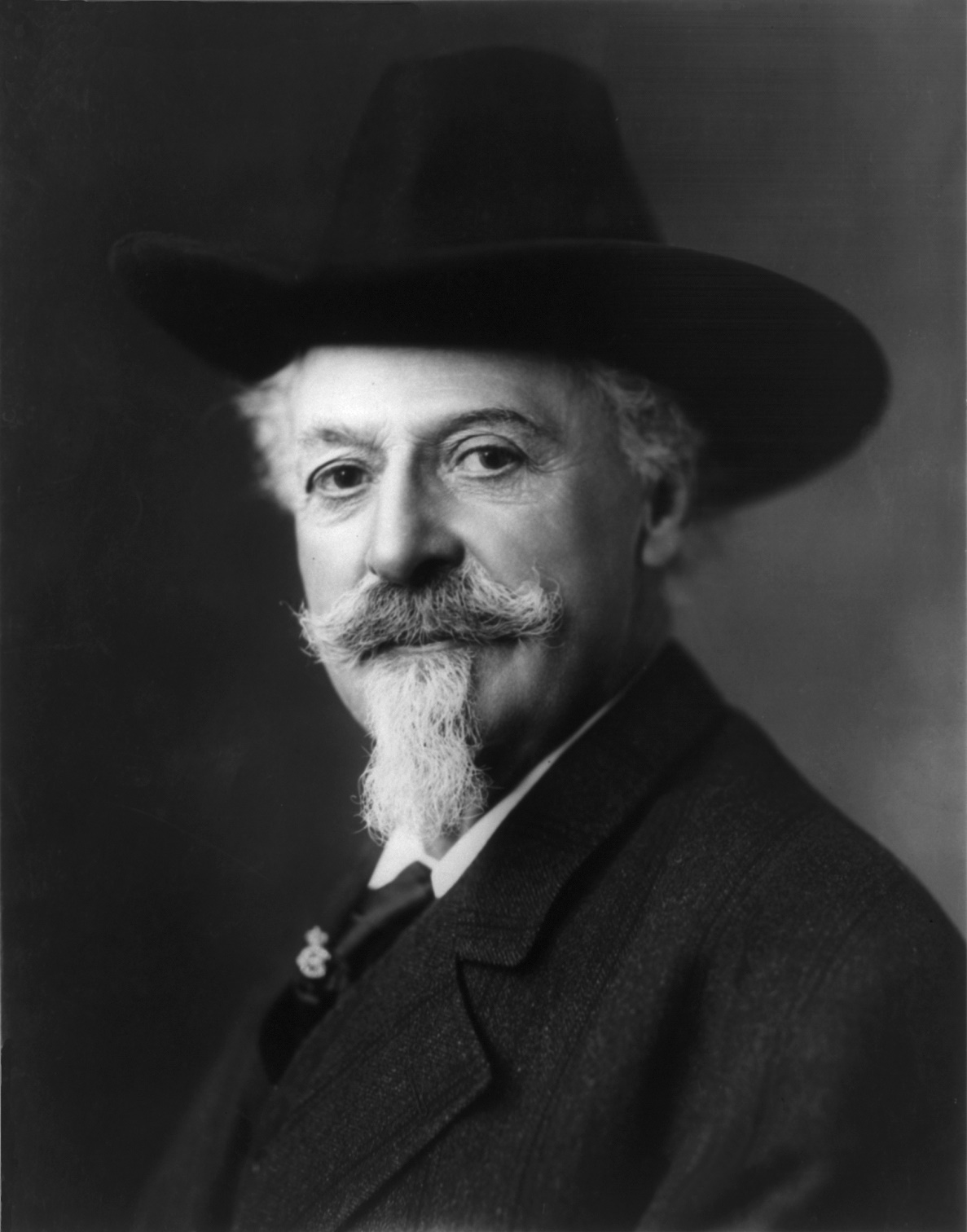
Buffalo Bill Cody

- January 2 – Sir Edward Tylor, English anthropologist (b. 1832)
- January 4 – Frederick Selous, British explorer (b. 1851)
- January 6
  - Sir Frederick Borden, Canadian politician (b. 1847)
  - Hendrick Peter Godfried Quack, Dutch economist, historian (b. 1834)
- January 8 – Mary Arthur McElroy, de facto First Lady of the United States (b. 1841)
- January 10 – Buffalo Bill, American frontiersman (b. 1846)
- January 16 – George Dewey, U.S. admiral (b. 1837)
- January 18 – Andrew Murray, South African author, educationist and pastor (b. 1828)
- January 28 – Yikuang, Prince Qing of the First Rank (b. 1838)
- January 29 – Evelyn Baring, 1st Earl of Cromer, British diplomat and colonial administrator (b. 1841)
- February 3 – Alexey Abaza, Russian admiral and politician (b. 1853)
- February 5 – Jaber II Al-Sabah, Emir of Kuwait (b. 1860)
- February 8 – Anton Haus, Austro-Hungarian admiral (b. 1851)
- February 10 – John William Waterhouse, Italian-born English artist (b. 1849)
- February 16 – Octave Mirbeau, French art critic and novelist (b. 1848)
- February 17 – Carolus-Duran, French painter (b. 1837)
- February 21
  - Joaquín Dicenta, Spanish writer (b. 1862)
  - Fred Mace, American actor (b. 1878)

=== March–April ===
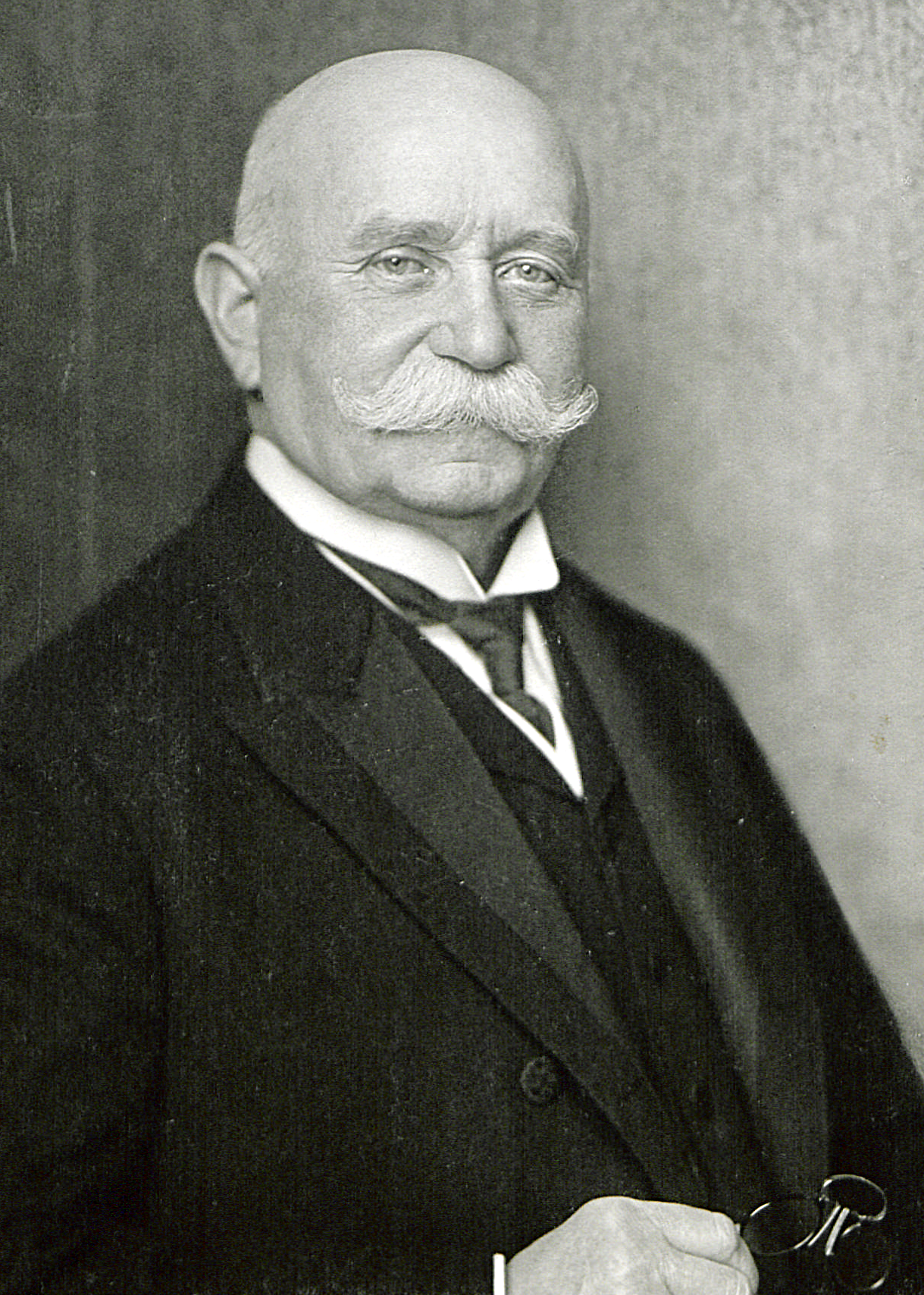
Ferdinand von Zeppelin

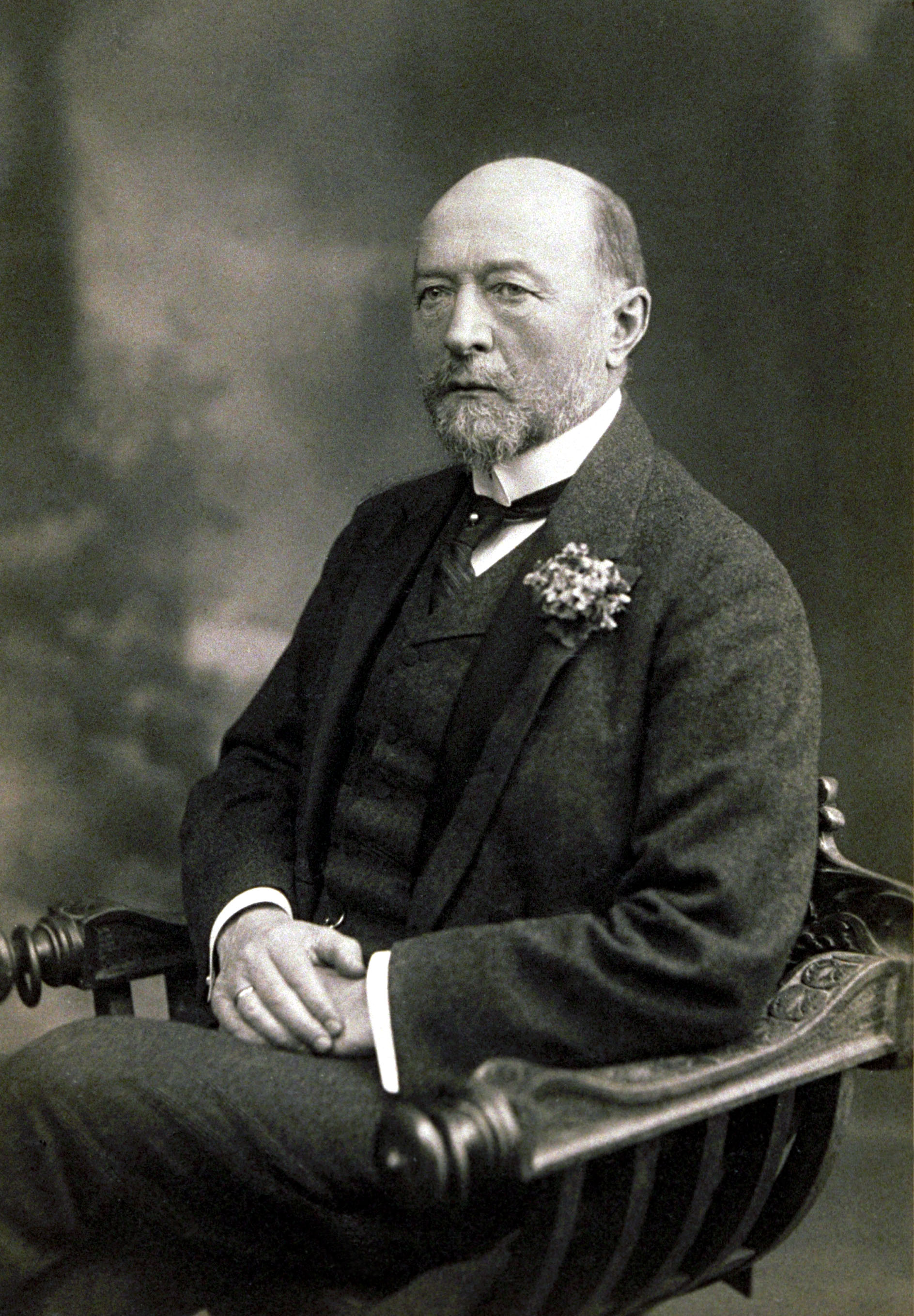
Emil von Behring

- March 5
  - Manuel de Arriaga, 1st President of Portugal (b. 1840)
  - Fredericus van Rossum du Chattel, Dutch painter (b. 1856)
- March 6 – Jules Vandenpeereboom, 17th Prime Minister of Belgium (b. 1843)
- March 8 – Ferdinand von Zeppelin, German general and inventor (b. 1838)
- March 14 – Robert Viren, Imperial Russian Navy admiral (b. 1857)
- March 17 – Franz Brentano, German philosopher, psychologist (b. 1838)
- March 29 – Maximilian von Prittwitz, German general (b. 1848)
- March 31 – Emil von Behring, German winner of the Nobel Prize in Physiology or Medicine (b. 1854)

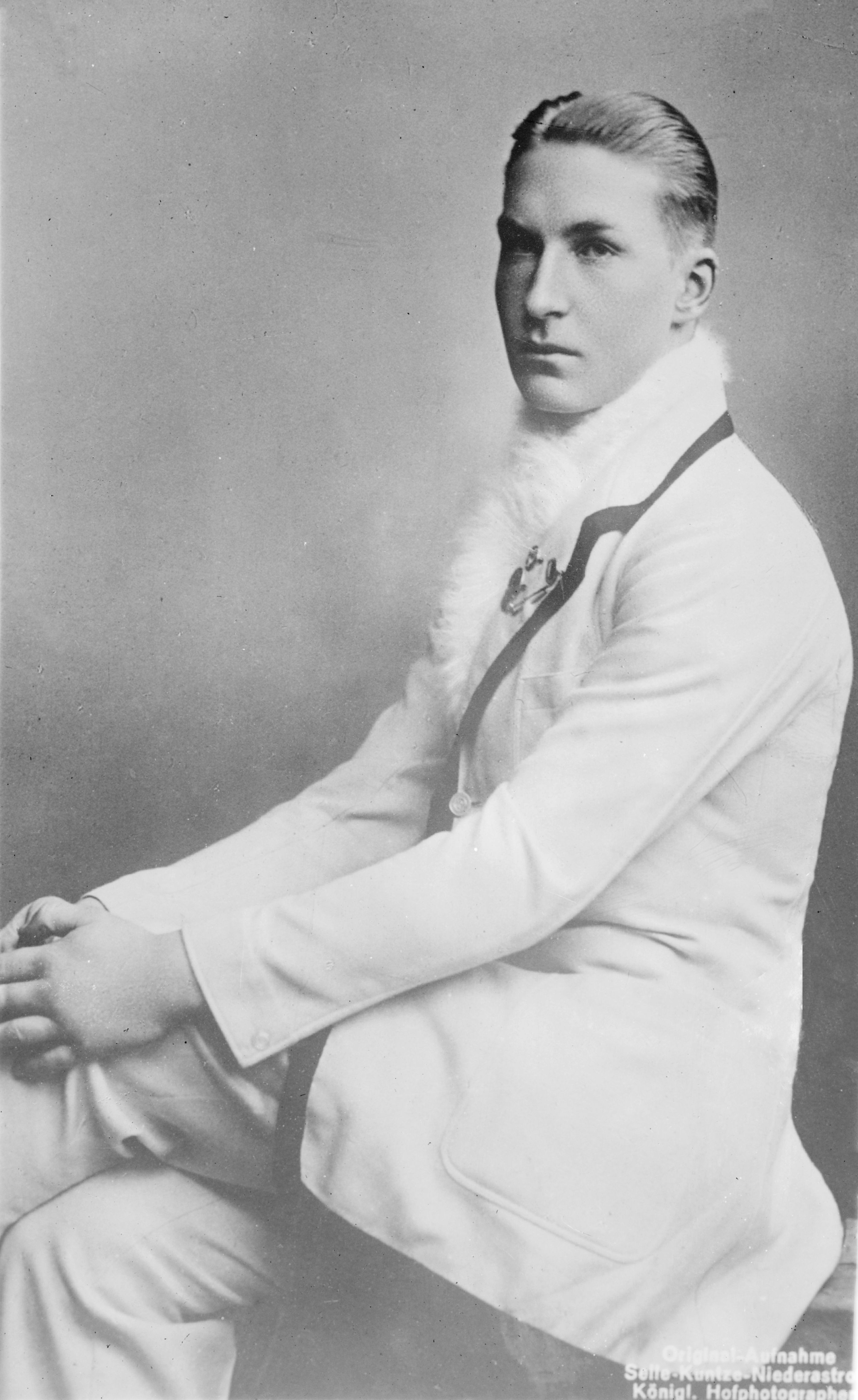
Prince Friedrich Karl of Prussia

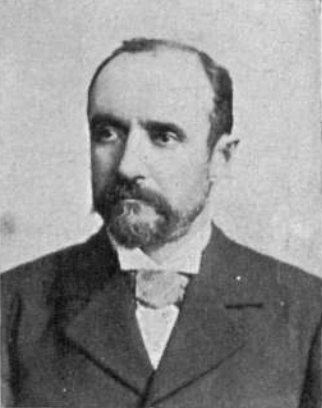
Jose Manuel Pando

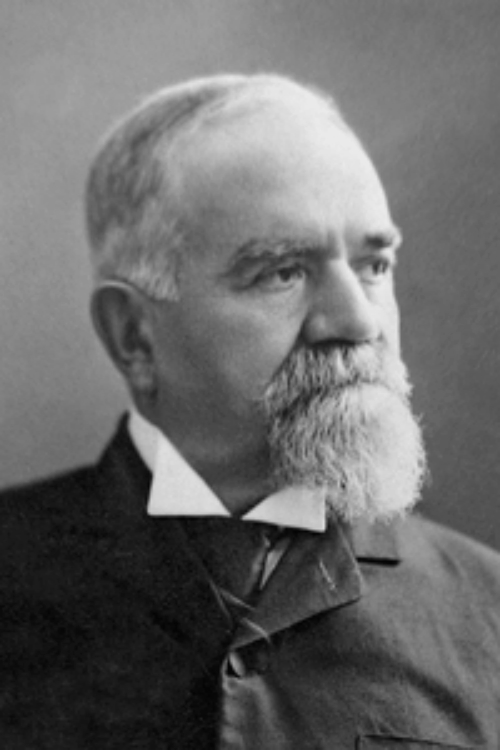
Titu Maiorescu

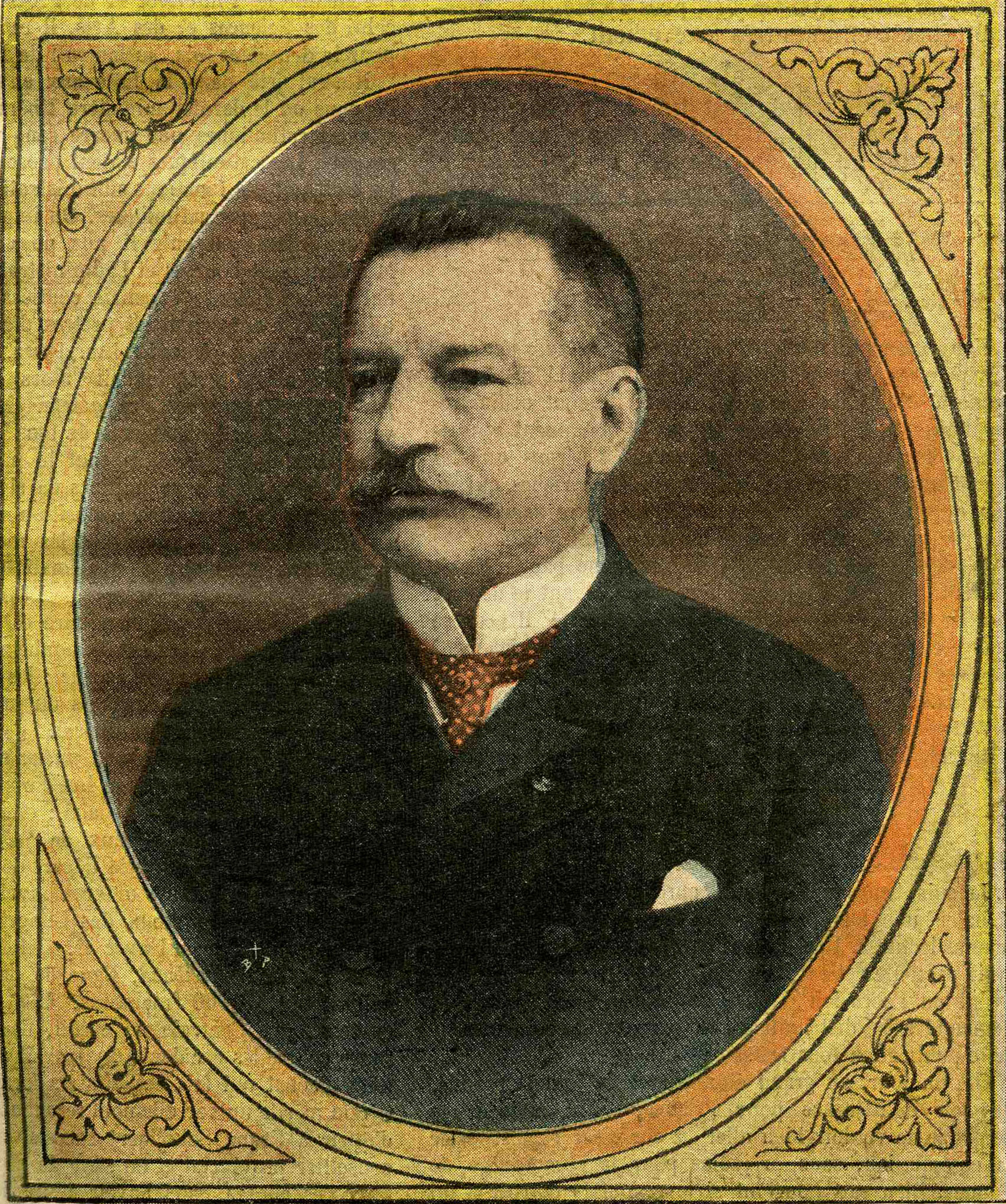
Frans Schollaert

- April 1 – Scott Joplin, African-American ragtime composer, pianist (b. c.1868)
- April 3 – Milton Wright, American bishop, father of the Wright brothers (b. 1828)
- April 6 – Prince Friedrich Karl of Prussia (b. 1893)
- April 7 – George Brown, British missionary (b. 1835)
- April 8 – Richard Olney, American politician (b. 1835)
- April 13 – Diamond Jim Brady, American businessman and philanthropist (b. 1856)
- April 14 – L. L. Zamenhof, Polish creator of Esperanto (b. 1859)
- April 18 – F. C. Burnand, British playwright and comic writer (b. 1836)
- April 29 – Tehaapapa III, Tahitian queen (b. 1879)

=== May–June ===
- May 7 – Albert Ball, British World War I fighter ace, posthumous Victoria Cross recipient (killed in action) (b. 1896)
- May 17
  - Charles Brooke, Rajah of Sarawak (b. 1829)
  - Radomir Putnik, Serbian field marshal (b. 1847)
  - Clara Ayres, American nurse (b. 1880)
- May 18 – John Nevil Maskelyne, English magician and inventor (b. 1839)
- May 20 – Philipp von Ferrary, Italian stamp collector (b. 1850)
- May 23 – Queen Ranavalona III of Madagascar (b. 1855)
- May 24 – Les Darcy, Australian boxer (b. 1895)
- May 25
  - Maksim Bahdanovič, Belarusian poet (b. 1891)
  - René Dorme, French World War I fighter ace (killed in action) (b. 1894)
- May 27 – Yevgeni Ivanovich Alekseyev, Imperial Russian Navy admiral and politician (b. 1843)
- May 29 – Kate Harrington, American teacher, writer and poet (b. 1831)
- June 3 – Matilda Carse, Irish-born American businesswoman, social reformer (b. 1835)
- June 5 – Karl Emil Schäfer, German World War I fighter ace (killed in action) (b. 1891)
- June 12 – Teresa Carreño, Venezuelan pianist, singer, composer and conductor (b. 1853)
- June 14 – Thomas W. Benoist, American aviator, aircraft designer and manufacturer, founder of the world's first scheduled airline (b. 1874)
- June 15 – Kristian Birkeland, Norwegian physicist (b. 1867)
- June 17 – José Manuel Pando, 25th President of Bolivia (b. 1849)
- June 18 – Titu Maiorescu, Romanian politician, 23rd Prime Minister of Romania (b. 1840)
- June 26 – Ella Giles Ruddy, American author and essayist (b. 1851)
- June 27
  - Karl Allmenröder, German World War I fighter ace (killed in action) (b. 1896)
  - Gustav von Schmoller, German economist (b. 1838)
- June 29 – Frans Schollaert, 19th Prime Minister of Belgium (b. 1851)
- June 30
  - Antonio de La Gándara, French painter (b. 1861)
  - Dadabhai Naoroji, Indian politician (b. 1825)

=== July–August ===
Adolf von Baeyer

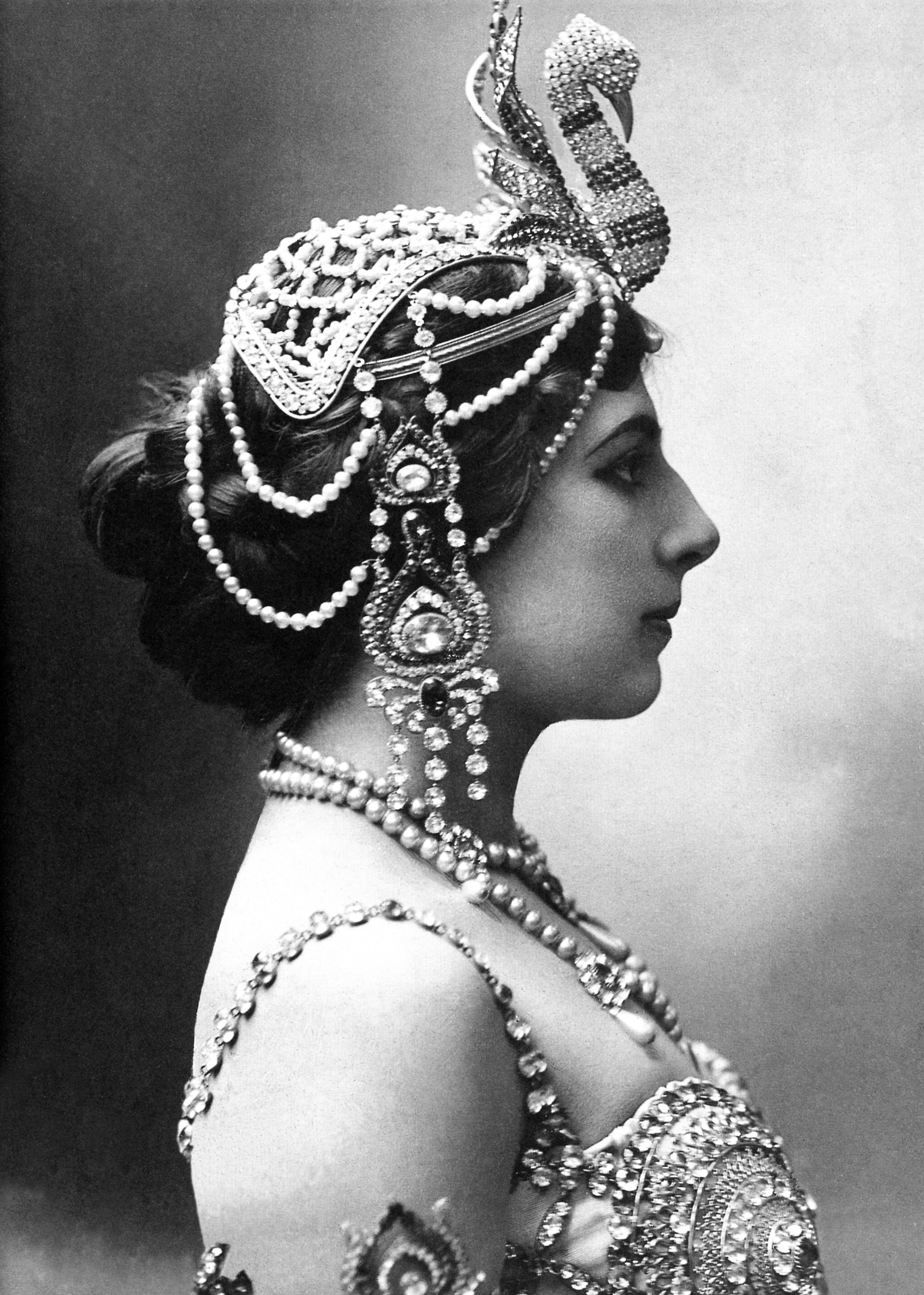
Mata Hari

- July 2
  - William Henry Moody, 35th United States Secretary of the Navy, 45th United States Attorney General, and Associate Justice of the Supreme Court of the United States (b. 1853)
  - Sir Herbert Beerbohm Tree, British actor (b. 1852)
- July 8 – Tom Thomson, Canadian painter (b. 1877)
- July 12
  - Donald Cunnell, British World War I fighter ace (killed in action) (b. 1893)
  - Hugo Simberg, Finnish symbolist painter and graphic artist (b. 1873)
- July 15 – Andrey Selivanov, Russian general and politician (b. 1847)
- July 16 – Philipp Scharwenka, Polish-German composer (b. 1847)
- July 20 – Ignaz Sowinski, Polish architect (b. 1858)
- July 27 – Emil Theodor Kocher, Swiss medical researcher, recipient of the Nobel Prize in Physiology or Medicine (b. 1841)
- July 28 – Ririkumutima, Queen regent of Burundi
- July 31
  - Francis Ledwidge, Irish poet (killed in action) (b. 1887)
  - Hedd Wyn, Welsh poet (killed in action) (b. 1887)
- August 3
  - Ferdinand Georg Frobenius, German mathematician (b. 1849)
  - John Thomson, Australian politician (b. 1853)
- August 13 – Eduard Buchner, German chemist, Nobel Prize laureate (b. 1860)
- August 17 – John W. Kern, American Democratic politician (b. 1849)
- August 20 – Adolf von Baeyer, German chemist, Nobel Prize laureate (b. 1835)
- August 20 – Jimmy Speirs, Scottish footballer, killed in action at Paschendaele
- August 30 – Alan Leo, British astrologer (b. 1860)

=== September–October ===
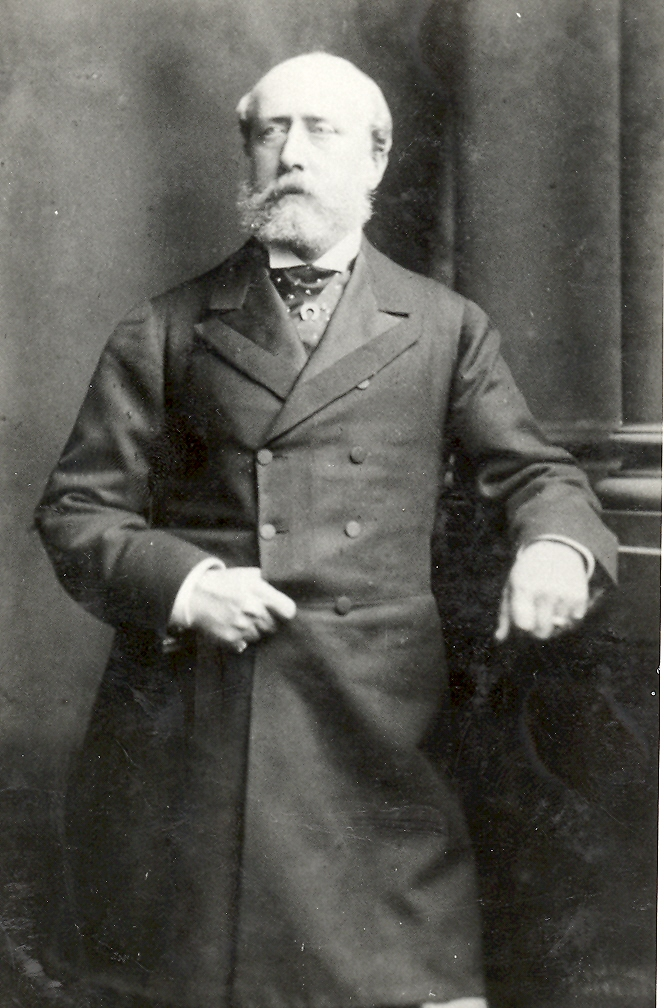
Prince Christian of Schleswig-Holstein

- September 9
  - Boris Stürmer, Russian prime minister (b. 1848)
  - Madge Syers, British figure skater (b. 1881)
- September 11 – Georges Guynemer, French World War I fighter ace (missing in action) (b. 1894)
- September 15 – Kurt Wolff, German World War I fighter ace (killed in action) (b. 1895)
- September 23 – Werner Voss, German World War I fighter ace (killed in action) (b. 1897)
- September 26 – Edward Miner Gallaudet, American educator of the deaf (b. 1837)
- September 27 – Edgar Degas, French painter (b. 1834)
- September 30 – Patricio Montojo y Pasarón, Spanish admiral (b. 1839)
- October 3 – Eduardo di Capua, Neapolitan composer and songwriter (b. 1865)
- October 4 – Dave Gallaher, New Zealand rugby union football player (killed in action) (b. 1873)
- October 9
  - Sarah Aaronsohn, member of the Jewish spy ring Nili (b. 1890)
  - Sultan Hussein Kamel of Egypt, (b. 1853)
- October 11 – Duke Philipp of Württemberg (b. 1838)
- October 13 – Florence La Badie, American actress (accident) (b. 1888)
- October 15 – Mata Hari, Dutch dancer, spy (executed) (b. 1876)
- October 16 – Gootchaux Ettinger, French-Brazilian politician and industrialist (b. 1836)
- October 19 – Bobby Atherton, Welsh footballer (b. 1876)
- October 22 – Bob Fitzsimmons, British boxer, World Heavyweight Champion (b. 1863)
- October 23 – Eugène Grasset, Swiss artist (b. 1845)
- October 27 – Arthur Rhys-Davids, British fighter ace (killed in action) (b. 1897)
- October 28 – Prince Christian of Schleswig-Holstein (b. 1831)
- October 30
  - John Mills "Private John" Allen, American lawyer and politician (b. 1846)
  - Heinrich Gontermann, German fighter ace (flying accident) (b. 1896)

=== November–December ===
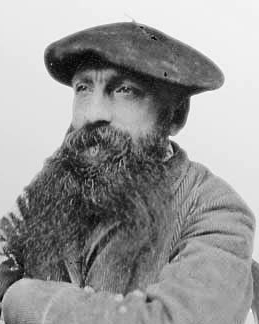
Auguste Rodin

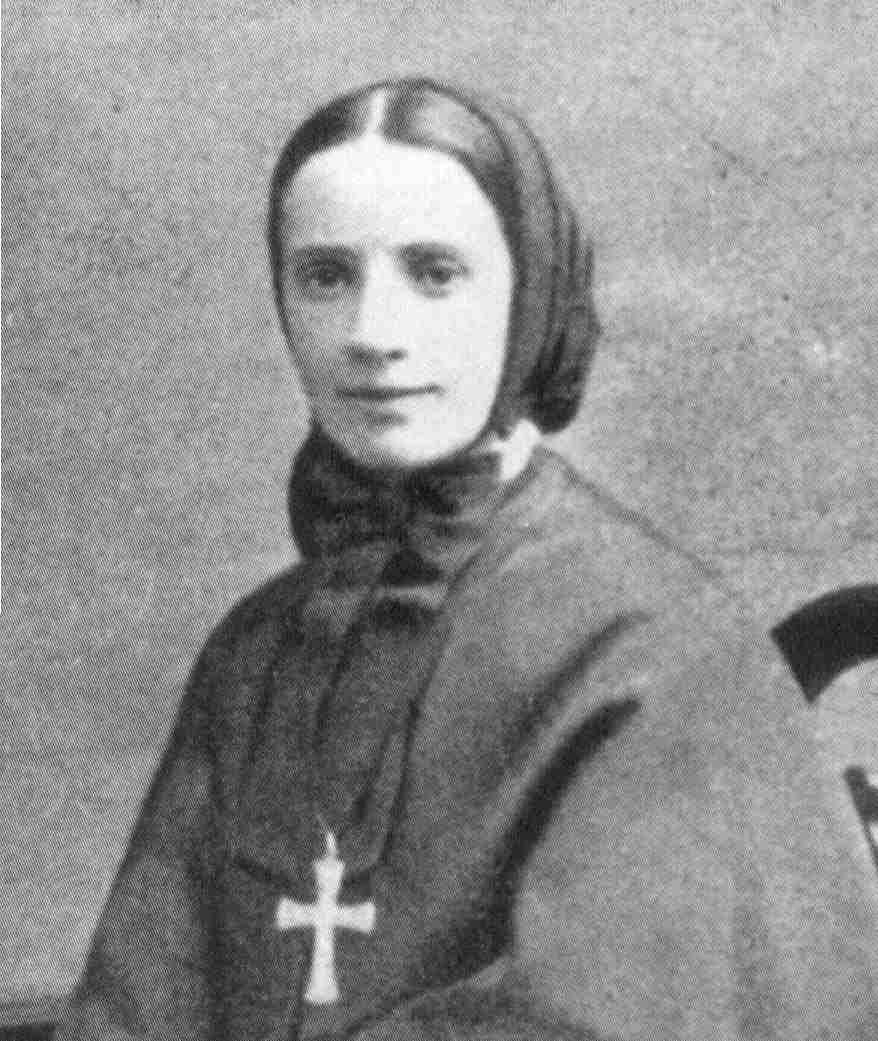
Saint Frances Xavier Cabrini

- November 2 – Tringe Smajli, Albanian guerrilla fighter and sworn virgin (b. 1880)
- November 3 – Frederick Rodgers, American admiral (b. 1842)
- November 7 – Margaret Cleaves, American physician and writer (b. 1848)
- November 8 – Colin Blythe, English cricketer (b. 1879)
- November 11 – Liliʻuokalani, last monarch of the Kingdom of Hawaii (b. 1838)
- November 15 – Émile Durkheim, French sociologist (b. 1858)
- November 16 – Adolf Reinach, German philosopher (killed in action) (b. 1883)
- November 17
  - Neil Primrose, British Liberal MP (killed in action) (b. 1882)
  - Auguste Rodin, French sculptor (b. 1840)
- December 8 – Mendele Mocher Sforim, Russian Yiddish, Hebrew writer (b. 1836)
- December 10 – Sir Mackenzie Bowell, 5th Prime Minister of Canada (b. 1823)
- December 12 – Andrew Taylor Still, American father of osteopathy (b. 1828)
- December 17 – Elizabeth Garrett Anderson, English physician and suffragette (b. 1836)
- December 19 – Richard Maybery, British fighter ace (killed in action) (b. 1895)
- December 20 – Eric Campbell, Scottish actor (accident) (b. 1879)
- December 22
  - Frances Xavier Cabrini, first American canonized as a saint (b. 1850)
  - Stanisław Tondos, Polish painter (b. 1854)
- December 24 – Ivan Goremykin, Russian prime minister (b. 1839)
- December 28 – Alfred Edwin McKay, Canadian fighter ace (killed in action) (b. 1892)

== Nobel Prizes ==

- Physics – Charles Glover Barkla
- Chemistry – not awarded
- Medicine – not awarded
- Literature – Karl Adolph Gjellerup, Henrik Pontoppidan
- Peace – International Committee of the Red Cross
