= Stalemate in Southern Palestine =

WWI British-Turkish military standoff (1917)

- Part of the Middle Eastern theatre of World War I
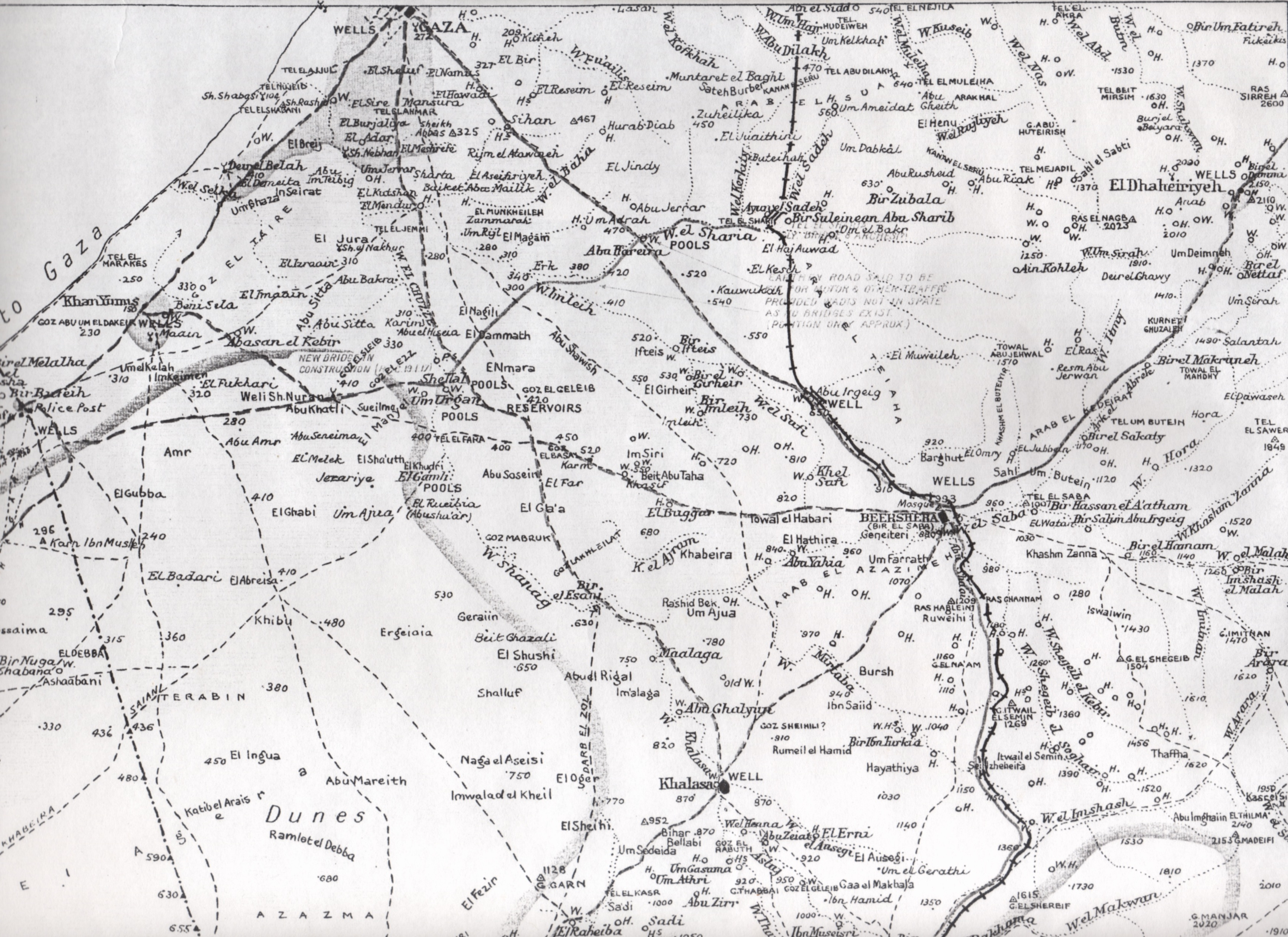
- British Army map of the Gaza and Beersheba areas
Date	April to October 1917
Location	Gaza to Hareira/Gamli, and the open eastern flank to Beersheba
Result	Ended with EEF victory at the Battle of Beersheba

Belligerents
British Empire; France; Italy	Ottoman Empire; German Empire

Commanders and leaders
(United Kingdom of Great Britain and Ireland) Archibald Murray (to June) (United Kingdom of Great Britain and Ireland) Sir Edmund Allenby (from July) (British Empire) Edward Bulfin (Australia) Harry Chauvel (British Empire) Philip Chetwode	(Ottoman Empire) Mustafa Kemal Pasha (resigned in October 1917) (Ottoman Empire) Fevzi Pasha (German Empire) Erich von Falkenhayn (from June) (German Empire) Friedrich von Kressenstein

Units involved
Egyptian Expeditionary Force: Eastern Force; Desert Mounted Corps; XX Corps; XXI Corps	Fourth Army: XX Corps; XXII Corps; Yildirim Army Group: Seventh Army; Eighth Army (ex Fourth Army); German Asia Corps

The Stalemate in Southern Palestine was a six-month standoff between the British Egyptian Expeditionary Force (EEF) and the Ottoman Army in World War I. The two hostile forces faced each other along the Gaza to Beersheba line during the Sinai and Palestine campaign, with neither side able to force its opponent to withdraw. The stalemate began in April 1917 with the defeat of the EEF by the Ottoman Army at the Second Battle of Gaza and lasted until the EEF offensive began with the Battle of Beersheba on 31 October 1917.

Previous to the stalemate, units of the Ottoman Fourth Army had been forced out of the Sinai Peninsula by a series of EEF victories: the Battle of Romani in August 1916, the Battle of Magdhaba in December and the Battle of Rafa in January 1917. The EEF followed up those victories by making two unsuccessful attempts to capture Gaza: the First Battle of Gaza in March, and the Second Battle of Gaza in April. These two Ottoman victories halted the attempted EEF invasion of southern Palestine, leading to the stalemate.

During the six-month-long stalemate, the EEF held positions on the edge of the Negev Desert, while both sides engaged in continuous trench warfare and contested mounted patrolling of the open eastern flank. Both sides took the opportunity to reorganise their forces, change commanders, conduct training and prepare for future major battles, which resulted in the EEF capture of Jerusalem in December 1917.

== British defeats at Gaza ==
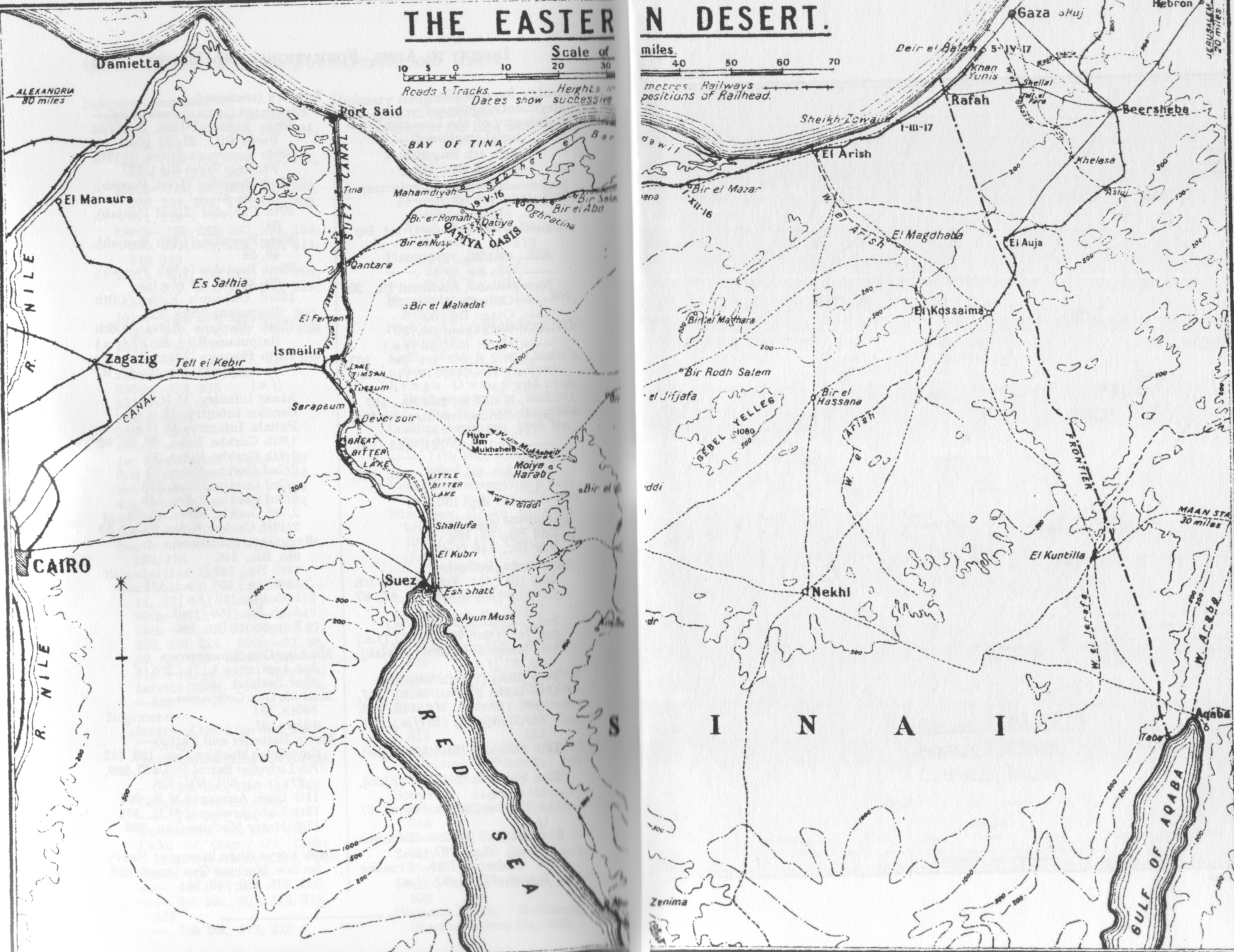
The Eastern Desert (also known as the Negev)

After the first British defeat at Gaza in March 1917, the commander of Eastern Force, Lieutenant-General Charles Dobell, sacked the commander of the 53rd (Welsh) Division, Major-General Alister Dallas, while the division was transferred from the Desert Column to Eastern Force. However, after a second defeat on 21 April, General Archibald Murray in turn sacked Dobell, promoting the commander of the Desert Column, Lieutenant-General Philip Chetwode, in his place. Chetwode was replaced by Harry Chauvel, promoted from command of the Anzac Mounted Division, while Edward Chaytor, commanding the New Zealand Mounted Rifles Brigade, was promoted to replace Chauvel. Yet General Murray would also be relieved of command of the Egyptian Expeditionary Force (EEF) in June and was sent back to England.

With its back to the Negev Desert following their defeat at the Second Battle of Gaza, the EEF had been fortunate that the Ottoman forces did not launch a large-scale counter-attack, as such an attack would likely have succeeded in pushing the EEF back a considerable distance. Regardless, the EEF faced the urgent problems of securing the positions it held at the end of the battle, and reorganising and reinforcing its severely depleted infantry divisions.

The British suffered nearly 4,000 casualties during the first battle for Gaza, and more than 6,000 casualties during the second. These casualties had to be managed, with the dead buried and their personal effects stored or sent home, and the wounded cared for. Meanwhile, the EEF's railway, which had reached Deir el Belah before the second battle of Gaza, was extended by a branch line to Shellal.

As the EEF withdrew following the Second Battle of Gaza, the New Zealand Mounted Rifles Brigade took up a position at Tel el Fara on the Wadi Ghazza, five miles (8.0 km) south of Gaza, where they dug trenches in case of a counter-attack.

Both sides constructed extensive entrenchments (which were particularly strong where they almost converged) to defend the Gaza–Beersheba line. These trenches resembled those on the Western Front, except they were not so extensive and had an open flank.

Between 400–2,500 yards (370–2,290 m) apart, the defensive lines stretched 30 miles (48 km) from Sheikh Ailin on the Mediterranean Sea to Sheikh Abbas and on to Tel el Jemmi and Beersheba. However, from a point just beyond Sheikh Abbas, the continuous trench lines became a series of fortified strong points, as the Ottoman line extended south-east along the Gaza to Beersheba road, while the EEF line following the Wadi Ghazza turned more sharply south to be as much as nine miles (14 km) south of the Ottoman line.

== Situation after battles for Gaza ==
=== German and Ottoman forces ===
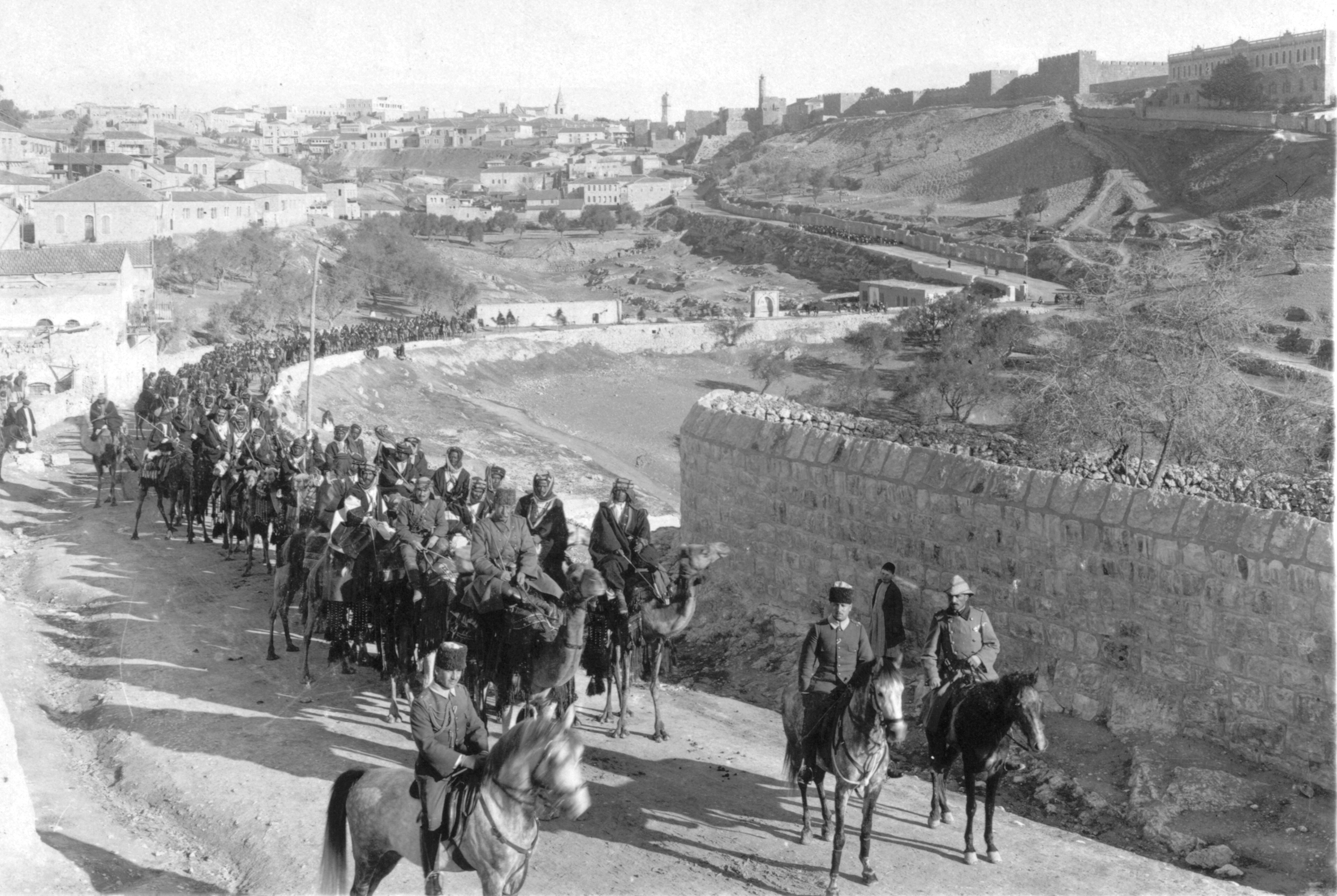
Ottoman Arab Camel Corps

The Ottoman Fourth Army after the Second Battle of Gaza consisted of 174,908 men, 36,225 animals, 5,351 camels, armed with 145,840 rifles, 187 machine guns, and 282 artillery pieces. At this time the Fourth Army's five corps were responsible for garrisoning Palestine, the northern coast of Syria, and the Hejaz railway.

The strategic priorities of Enver Pasha and the Ottoman General Staff were to use this force to push the EEF back to the Suez Canal and to retake Baghdad and Mesopotamia along with Persia, while relying on "nonexistent interior lines of communication" and "chronic shortfalls in strategic transportation." In 1917 the Turkish 54th and 59th Infantry Divisions in Palestine and Syria became inoperative. The loss of these two divisions was blamed on problems of supply caused by the single–track, incomplete railway line from Turkey, which was not completed through the Taurus and Amanus mountains until 1918. Despite these deficiencies, following the two victories at Gaza, the Ottoman Army was "greatly strengthened in both force and morale."

Within a few weeks of the April battle for Gaza, General von Kressenstein, German field commander under Djemal Pasha, added, to his 3rd, 16th and 53rd Divisions of the Fourth Army, the 7th and 54th Divisions as reinforcements. This force was reorganised into two corps to hold the Gaza to Beersheba line: the XX Corps (16th and 54th Infantry Divisions, 178th Infantry Regiment, 3rd Cavalry Division), and the XXII Corps (3rd, 7th, 53rd Infantry Divisions).

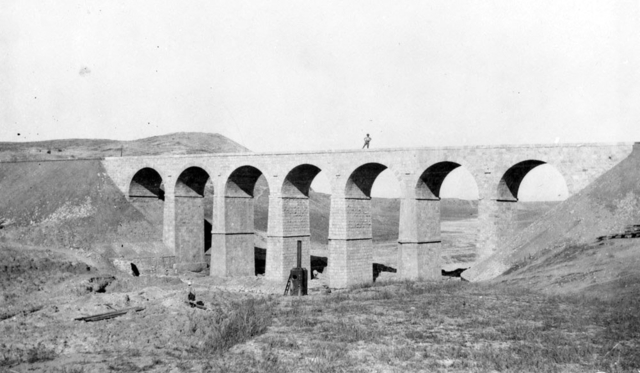
The Sheria railway bridge east of Tel esh Sheria over the Wadi el Sheria, showing the ruggedness of the countryside

The 30-mile (48 km)-long Ottoman front line stretched southeastwards from Gaza and dominated the country to the southwest, where the EEF was spread out in open, low-lying, rugged country interrupted by many deep wadis. From Gaza to Beersheba, this front line "stretch[ed] continuously for almost fifty kilometres." Major defensive outposts along the line, such as Rijm el Atawineh and Aba Hareira, could support each other; and, as they overlooked an almost flat plain, making a frontal attack against them virtually impossible. Between Gaza and Aba Hareira, at the Wadi el Sheria and halfway to Beersheba, the Ottoman defences were especially strong. Although those strengthened defences did not extend to Beersheba, strong fortifications, some being blasted from solid rock, made the isolated town a fortress.

Closest to Gaza, the 3rd Division of von Kressenstein's Fourth Army was deployed to defend Gaza and the defences stretching from Samson's Ridge, 2 miles (3.2 km) southwest of Gaza, along the Beersheba Road to Khashm el Bir and Khashm Sihan. From that point the Ottoman defences along the road were held by the 53rd Division, while the 79th Regiment defended fortified works which linked with two battalions of the 16th Division holding Tel esh Sheria, 15 miles (24 km) from Gaza and halfway along the defensive line, while the Ottoman cavalry division was deployed near Huj, 10 miles (16 km) east of Gaza.

New troop reinforcements for the buildup were incorporated into the organisational restructuring that saw formation of the Yildirim Army Group and the Seventh and Eighth Armies. New units were schooled in new combat methods developed on the Western Front and conducted multi-echelon combined-arms training. Among these new arrivals, the experience of the 7th Infantry Division (later part of the Eighth Army) was typical. This division left Constantinople on 14 January 1917, and by mid-April was being reorganised in Aleppo before travelling via Jerusalem, to arrive at Beersheba, between 7 May and 14 June 1917. While at Jerusalem in early May the division's 20th Infantry Regiment began company-level training, and after arriving at Beersheba remained in reserve, conducting theatre-specific training until late June, when it went into the front line, training in hand-grenade and trench-mortar use, fortification, reconnaissance, and counter-reconnaissance continuing. The division's 21st Infantry Regiment received similar training.

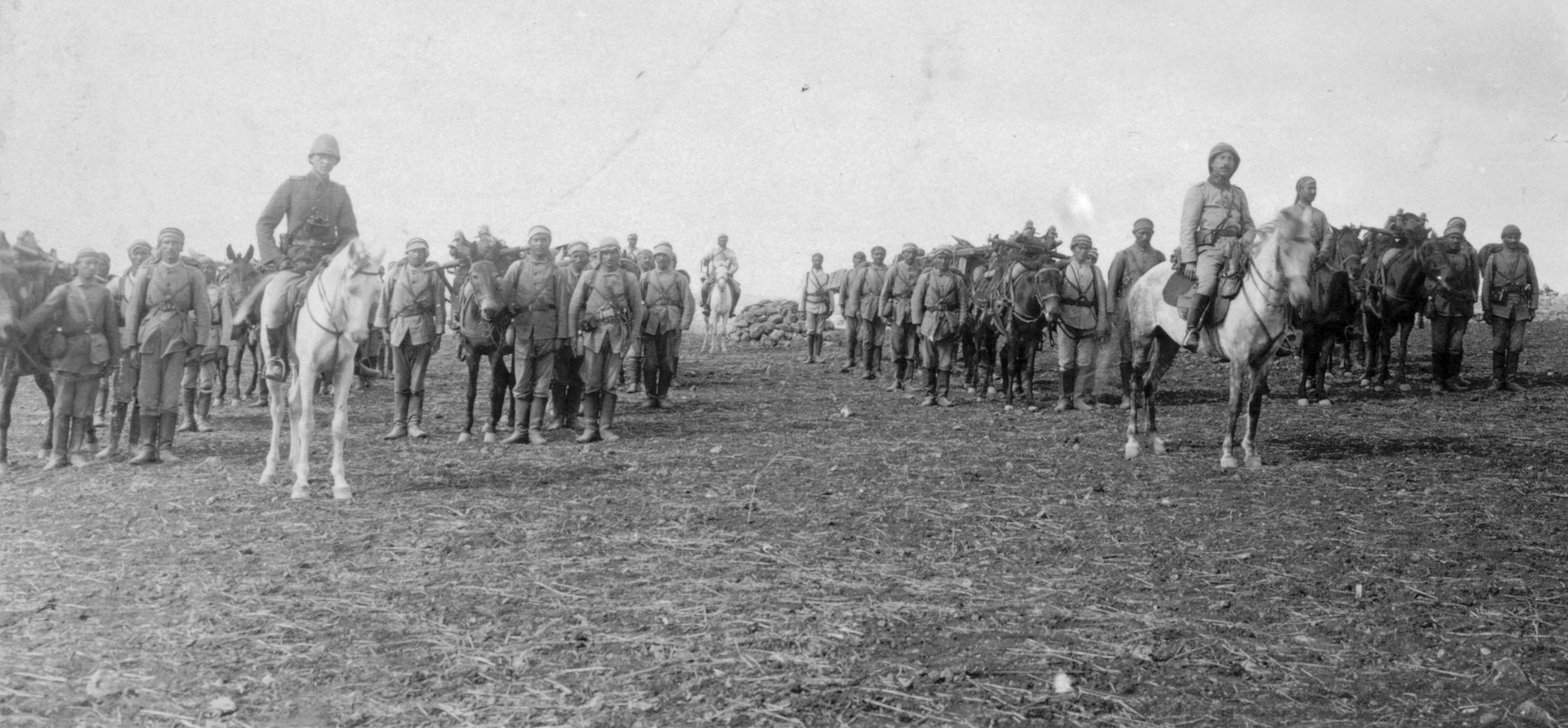
Ottoman Machine Gun Company (not the photo referred to in Note 1)

From 28 June to 10 August, the 7th Division, and eventually every Ottoman infantry division in Palestine, reorganised so that a quarter of their rifle strength, one company of every four, was outfitted with light machine guns, considerably increasing fire power and strengthening offensive and defensive capabilities. In addition, von Kressenstein, who commanded the Gaza to Beersheba defences, ordered assault detachments equivalent to the German Stosstruppen (known as Stormtroopers) to be formed. The 7th Division activated an assault detachment of 50 men on 17 July 1917. (Note: Imperial War Museum Photograph Q80044 depicts a platoon of Ottoman Army stormtroops in Palestine in the summer of 1918 published by Dr. David Nicolle in The Ottoman Army, 1914–1918 (London: Osprey Press, 1994), p. 23. The same photo can be seen in Perrett, Megiddo 1918, p. 30. Erickson describes the photograph. "The men are outfitted in well fitting uniforms, German–style steel helmets, have under–arm grenade bags with stick grenades, German Mauser rifles, and puttee leggings. This unique photograph is important because the men look confident and fit, well fed, and are thoroughly equipped – indeed, a picture that is at odds with our historical perception of the Ottoman Army in Palestine. Although it is dangerous to draw a generalised conclusion from Nicolle's photograph, it is obvious that the Turks, at least in one locality, gave a high priority to the selection of men, for and to the maintenance of, its assault troop formations." [Erickson 2007 pp. 103–4])

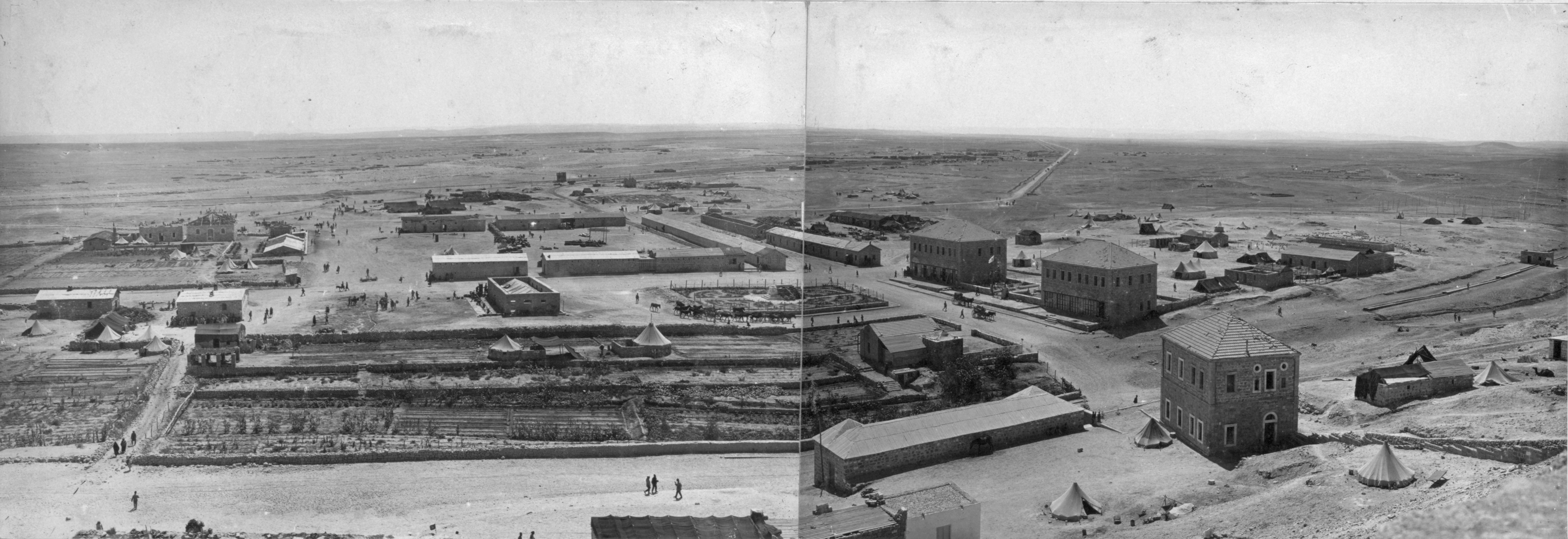
Ottoman military town of Hafir el Aujah, the Principal Desert Base evacuated early in 1917

The central training facility was located at the main Ottoman base of Tel esh Sheria, midway between Gaza and Beersheba, having moved north from Hafir el Auja, in early 1917, as the EEF approached Gaza. The school was staffed by German and Austrian instructors, as well as experienced Ottoman officers, from the European fronts of Galicia, Romania, and Macedonia. Courses were conducted in tactics and weapons then being employed on the Western Front. Commanders received a 15-day course and divisional officers a six–week course focused on the use of machine guns, "which was vital to the newly reorganised Ottoman infantry battalions." Artillery training also included up-to-date methods and tactics.

=== Egyptian Expeditionary Force ===
The EEF's strength, once enough for an advance into Palestine, had been decimated by the two battles for Gaza. The 52nd (Lowland), the 53rd (Welsh), and the 54th (East Anglian) Divisions, which had been reported to be about 1,500 below establishment before the first battle, lost a further 10,000 casualties during the two battles. (Note: The two mounted divisions only lost a total of about 750 casualties. [Falls 1930 Vol. 1 p. 348]) Three months later, they would still be 5,150 infantry and 400 yeomanry below strength. A much larger force would be needed to defeat the strongly entrenched and newly reinforced Ottoman positions.

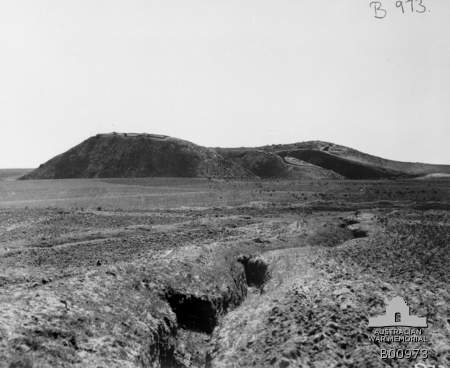
Tel el Fara and trenches

Permanent defences were constructed from the sea at Gaza to Shellal on the Wadi Ghazza. From Shellal a lightly entrenched line extended to El Gamli, before continuing south 7 miles (11 km) to Tel el Fara. The western sector stretched almost to Tel el Jemmi, and was strongly entrenched and wired, and defended by infantry. The Desert Column was responsible for outposts and patrols in the open plain stretching east and south of the eastern flank, and for harassing Ottoman forces at every opportunity, while wells and cisterns were mapped.

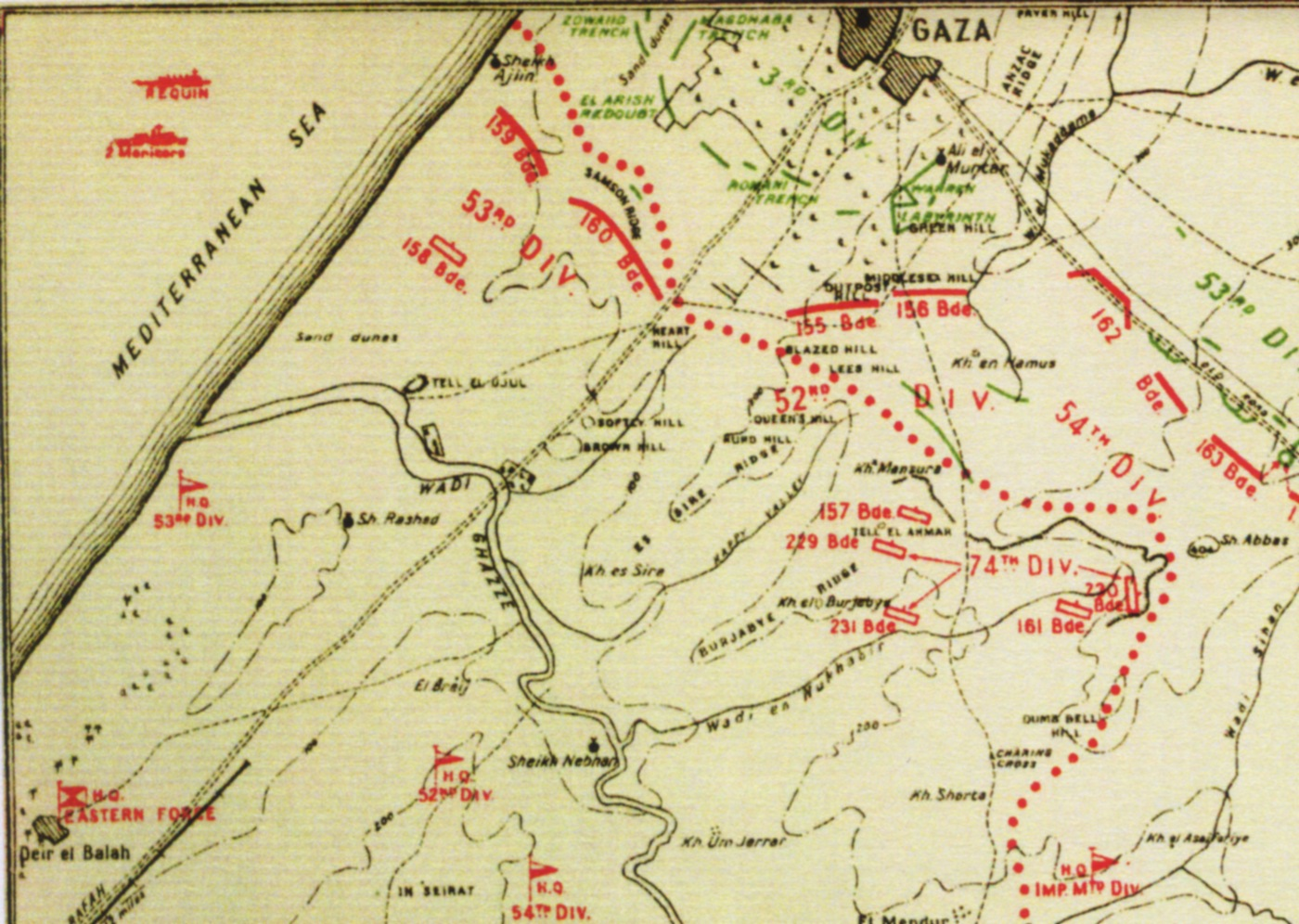
Sketch map showing western sector of the front line. Red dots indicate EEF positions consolidated in April

The open eastern flank was dominated by the Wadi Ghazza, which could only be crossed at four places, apart from the beach on the Mediterranean coast. These were the main Deir el Belah to Gaza road crossing; the Tel el Jemmi crossing, which had been used during the first battle of Gaza; the Shellal crossing on the Khan Yunis to Beersheba road; and the Tel el Fara crossing on the Rafa to Beersheba road. Difficulties crossing elsewhere along the wadi were due to the 50–60 feet (15–18 m) perpendicular banks cut into the Gaza–Beersheba plain by flooding two or three times a year. During the stalemate numerous additional crossings were constructed.

Viewing across the open eastern flank was possible from the top of the "curiously shaped heaps of broken earth" near Shellal. Two tels, indicating possible sites of ancient cities, stood high above the plain and also provided excellent views. The spectacular, flat-topped Tel el Jemmi, with its perpendicular sides, one side dropping into the Wadi Ghazza, could be seen for miles. It had been used as a lookout during the first battle of Gaza. Tel el Fara, on the Rafa to Beersheba road, was a flat-topped prominence with conical sides 7 miles (11 km) further south, and was approximately 16 miles (26 km) inland from the coast in the centre of the Gaza to Beersheba front line. This large mound, near the Wadi Ghazza at Shellal, was thought to have been built by the crusaders in the 13th century as an observation post; and it gave an "uninterrupted view for several miles northward and eastward." At the base of Tel el Fara huge stone buttresses and several courses of cut stone could be seen at water level.

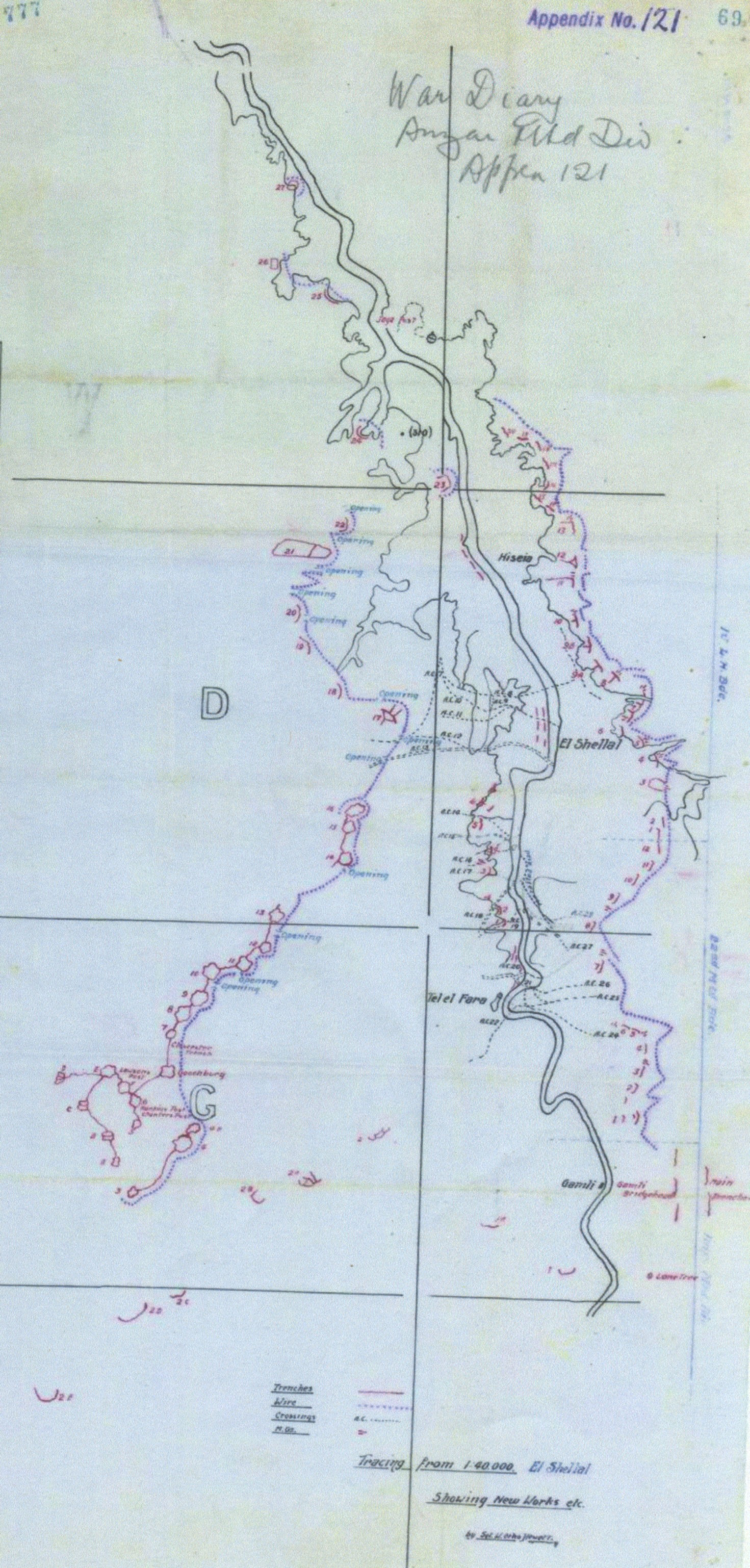
Sketch map of Shellal, Tel el Fara and Gamli showing trenches partly built by the Anzac Mounted Division

To the west of the Wadi Ghazza a reserve line along the old battle line was held by one infantry brigade. To the east of the Wadi Ghazza, the front line consisted of 25 redoubts manned by one platoon in each redoubt, except redoubts 2, 11, and 12, which each had two platoons. These redoubts, fronted by continuous wire entanglements, formed the firing line between Gamli and Hiseia 12,000 yards (11,000 m) to the north. In addition, the front line was strengthened by a support line of trenches, located 300 yards (270 m) behind the firing line, along the east bank of the Wadi Ghazza. Continuous wire entanglements with gaps for the main roads stretched for 11,000 yards (10,000 m) south. This battle line was held by one infantry division, which deployed in the front line one brigade and one artillery brigade, the latter located along the west bank of the Wadi Ghazza, from which the guns could "sweep the ground in front of the battle line."

Attacks were to be resisted strongly. Each garrison of front line infantry was to be reinforced from the support line in sufficient numbers to replace casualties. If a redoubt was lost, it was to be retaken "at once," either by a bombing attack or an assault across open ground.

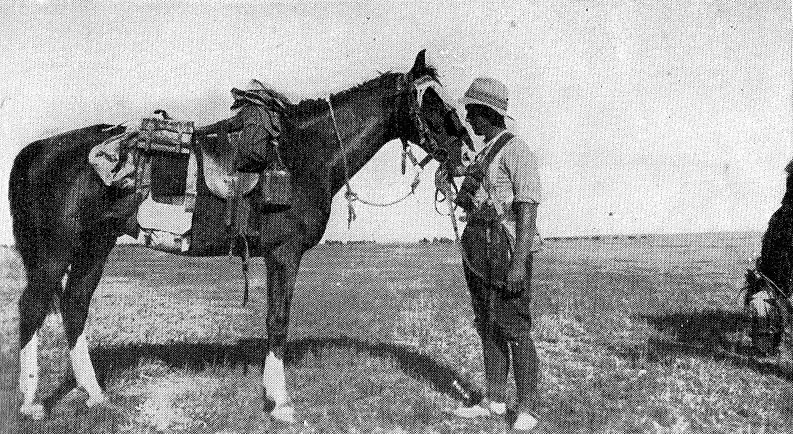
A typical troop horse saddled up for a march

Chauvel's Desert Column became responsible for the open eastern flank which extended the front line across no-man's-land to the south–west of Beersheba. "The Column Commander wishes to emphasise the necessity for the most vigorous aggressive action and to remind all commanders that their horses enable them to get quickly to the flank of the enemy – which should be the sole object in any operation." When ordered, the Imperial Mounted Division, which was in reserve, was to saddle up at once and move to the road junction 1 mile (1.6 km) south of El Melek, where orders would be received from Desert Column headquarters, which would also move forward. It would be important that mounted units be engaged as far as possible to the east or to the south. Every effort would be made to make the Um Siri to El Buqqar line untenable for the attackers, and at every encounter the Ottoman cavalry was to be "severely dealt with."

Reconnaissance aircraft worked from April to provide aerial photographs to update and correct existing maps, the best of which had been produced in 1881 by Lieutenant Herbert Kitchener, R.E., and Lieutenant Claude Conder for the Palestine Exploration Fund. The Royal Flying Corps surveyed hundreds of square miles, taking comprehensive aerial photographs of the Gaza to Beersheba line, which were used by Royal Engineers from Army Headquarters' survey companies to produce constantly revised maps showing changes to the Ottoman defences. Changes were also immediately reported to the area commander.

=== Living conditions ===
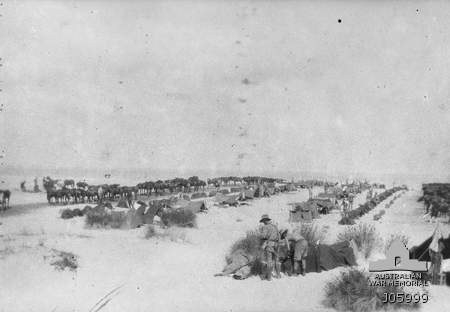
4th Light Horse Regiment bivouacs and horse lines at Khan Yunis in August 1917

Camping in the open during the summer with food shortages, the prevalence of debilitating sandfly fever, the regular hot desert winds known as khamsin sweeping in from the Negev Desert, and billowing, all-pervasive clouds of pulverised road dust, made life almost intolerable for both forces. (Note: The Fifty-second (Lowland) Division by Lieutenant Colonel R. R. Thompson gives a good description of the summer conditions. [Falls 1930 Vol. 2 p. 25 note]) One yeomanry officer reported "[a]nother sweltering day" on 16 May 1917, during a heatwave when a temperature of 120 degrees was recorded inside a tent. (Note: Although the 5th Mounted Brigade is said to be 'stationed at Ballah near the canal, [Woodward 2006 pp 23–4] the brigade was according to the Royal Gloucestershire Hussars war diary for May 1917 based at Deir el Belah. [1st Royal Gloucestershire Hussars Yeomanry Imperial Mounted Division (5th Mounted Brigade) AWM4-9-6-4 Part 1])

... the summer following the Gaza battles took its toll [on the EEF]. The inescapable heat, frequent khamsins, the ever–present dust, the struggle against the flies and lice, the boredom, from which danger itself was a relief, the monotony of the diet – all combined to wear down the condition of the army. In the Light Horse there were few who did not suffer from septic sores; sandfly fever was rife; one RMO, after examining the men of his regiment, concluded that one in three was suffering from dilation of the heart.

— Experiences of an EEF Regimental Medical Officer

The EEF's rations were noted for their lack of variety and poor quality. When in camp; rice, peas, dates, porridge, jam, bread, meat, and bread pudding were available; while sardines, pears, chocolate, sausages, milk, café au lait, cocoa, and biscuits could be bought from army canteens. However, during operations soldiers survived for long periods on "iron rations" (in individual tins), and a diet of Bully beef and army biscuits, which was only occasionally varied by cooking a stew made from tins of pressed beef and onions. Tinned stew, consisting of meat and mainly turnips and carrots, was available at times. Tea was drunk at every opportunity from early morning, during a break on the march, and in camp.

For the EFF, the troops' only relief came during rest periods on the Mediterranean coast, where a bivouac was described in glowing terms by Joseph W. McPherson, an officer in the Egyptian Camel Transport Corps. (Note: "I have been ensconced in a mossy flowery bank under the luxuriant hedge, writing this letter, to the wonderment of tortoises and lizards, green beetles and golden birds, with just enough bombing and shelling going on to remind me that my present role of gentle shepherd is not the main one. Gad el–Moula [his batman] brought me tea and biscuits at 3.30 and the men's rations were sent out to them, but the sun has now set gloriously over the sea behind the trees and swarms of fireflies are coming out to make the most of their little electric torches before the big moon mounts itself, bright stars appear for a moment in the sky and give place to thick black smoke rings, whilst others, paler but more permanent, gleam gently without smoke, a battalion of flamingos is manoeuvring overhead, wheeling and deploying, advancing in echelon and now, at the alarms of a Turkish shell, advancing at double march in extended order towards the lake, where armies of frogs and crickets sing in rivalry, and from the direction of the camp comes the sound of a bell, the Angelus perhaps, though I think it is more likely to be the Gas Alarm, and I have not my muzzle." [McPherson 1985 p. 175])

According to Downes, "morale on the Palestine front was a problem for the Ottoman Army command". In particular the Arab units were "depressed" making them "vulnerable to enemy propaganda." (Note: Following the two Ottoman victories at Gaza, the Ottoman Army was "greatly strengthened in both force and morale."[Downes 1938 p. 627]) Low Ottoman morale was blamed on logistical problems, which created shortages of food and water during the "terribly hot" summer of 1917, when, as Downes writes, "[p]ostal, recreational and health services were particularly deficient and desertion plagued units sent to the desert."

==== Dust ====
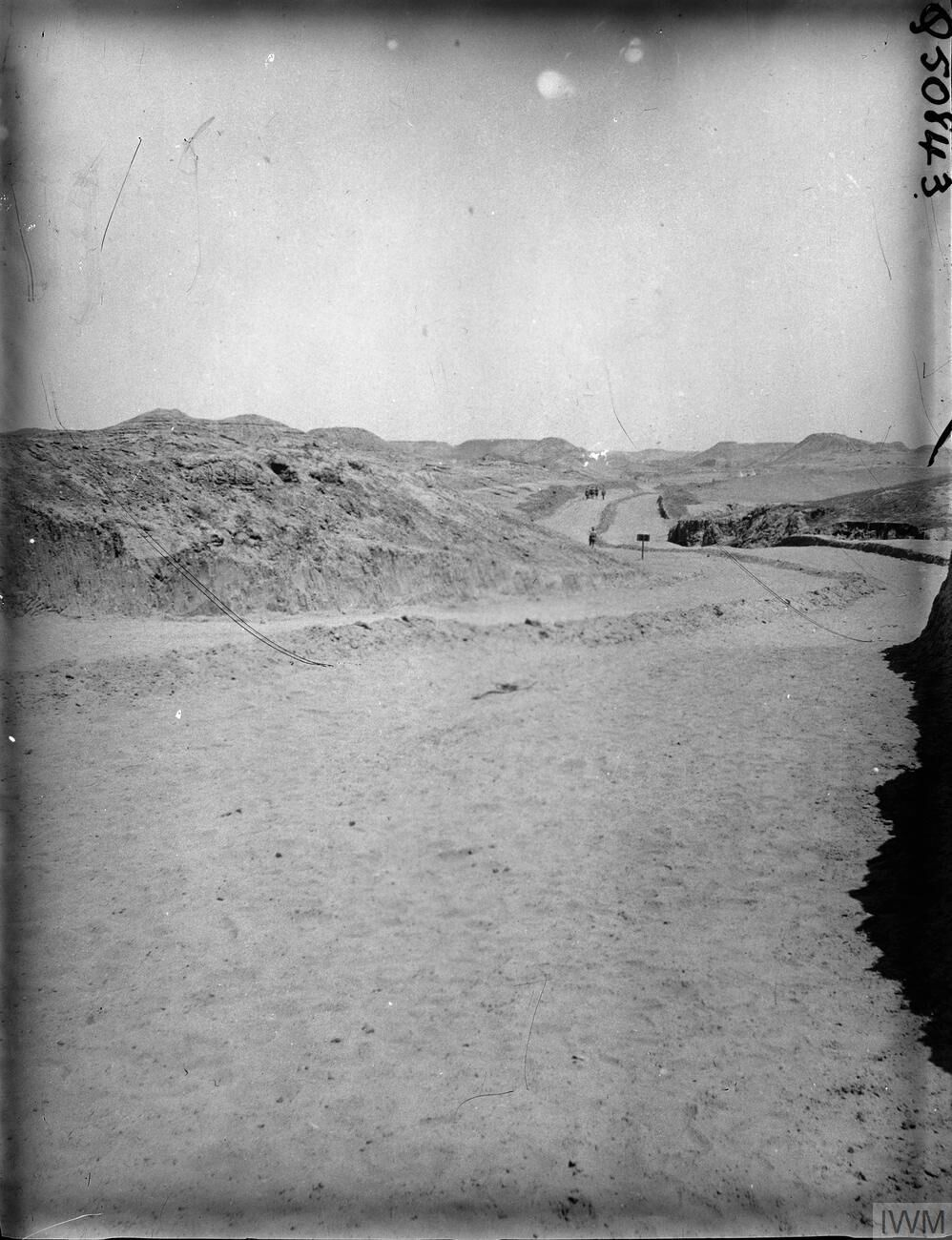
Shellal road

During the summer, the hot, southerly Khamsin winds, which could "rage" for days "like blasts from a furnace," blew so strongly that tents and marquees were blown down, leaving behind drifts of sand and fine dust, which could even block the railway line.

The fine dust found around Gaza—which in a sand storm hit the skin like red-hot needles and filled eyes, ears, noses, and mouths—was considered worse than the soft heavy sand. The dust would be stirred by a sea breeze that began at about 10:00 from the west or northwest, and which would continue blowing until dark. During this time the soldiers breathed dust, ate dust, and were wrapped in dust while sleeping in their bivouacs. Sand and dust got everywhere, but sand was considerably easier to cope with as it was "always clean and easy to shake away," but the "filthy, vile dust fog" clung to perspiring skin.

The area behind the front line was subject to constant traffic, which broke up the surfaces of all roads and tracks in the region, which became 12 inches (30 cm) or more deep with very fine dust. This dust lifted, even in light wind, to cover everything moving in a white cloud. As such clouds on the alluvial plain was an accurate indicator of troop movements, no offensive marches were made during daylight. "The dust raised by the horses is awful[,] and meals are a tribulation."

With 30,000 troops in a limited area of light clay soil for the dry summer, steps were taken to manage the dust problem. In the vicinity of camps, all traffic was restricted to certain main roads and tracks, which were swept bare, and with wire netting pegged across. The heap of dust along the edges of each road would be formed into a "curb" on each side, with boards placed against the curbs to indicate the way ahead.

==== Septic sores ====
Septic sores became common in the EFF during the summer of 1917. In July, 22 per cent of the Anzac Mounted Division was suffering from these sores, and that number increased in August. The sores were blamed mainly on poor diet, which was lacking in variety, vegetables, and clean water. Mosquito bites contributed to the prevalence of septic sores, but flies were the main reason minor cuts and scratches became septic. Flies were everywhere: in the men's drinks, food, and tents. The sores, which took the form of superficial ulcerations on the surface of the skin, often occurred following a slight injury to the hands. They were painful and hard to treat except by antiseptics, and such treatment was "hardly practicable in the field." The majority of the men suffering sores on hands or faces had to wear bandages, which "had a lowering and irritating effect upon the men." On the hands these dressings made work difficult; and, although dressings were changed twice daily, they became "filthy in no time," due to the dust. After the advance in November 1917 to the Jaffa and Ramleh region, where oranges were grown and easily obtained, the septic sores cleared up. (Note: The EEF by then had advanced out of the Negev Desert, and into the productive black soil plain of southern Palestine, watered by regular seasonal rainfall.[Gullett 1941 p. 491])

==== Delousing and washing ====
The daylight hours were filled with fleas, lice, flies, mice and delousing. "Every morning and whenever there is a spare minute, everyone takes off their shirts and opens their trousers to hunt for lice ... This louse hunting is quite a part of life." One triumph was recorded, "Bill I've had a regular Melbourne Cup Day. I've turned my bally breeches inside out and outside in 45 blithering times and I have broken the blighters little hearts." (Note: During a camp fire concert at Tel el Marakeb, this song about lice hunting, was sung to the tune of "John Peel," the New Zealand Mounted Rifles Brigade's march. "I went down the lines the other day/When I heard a fellow in the Waikatos say/I've caught 22 which is 30 less than you/But I hope to get some sleep before the morning." [Powles 1922 pp. 118–9]) On the King's birthday, 3 June, the New Zealand Mounted Rifles Brigade marched to Khan Yunis, where a steam disinfecting plant on the railway had been set up to delouse their clothes. The "clothes were placed in a big portable oven and literally baked ... to kill the bugs and lice." While the clothes were thus cleaned, a deep hole was made, over which a ground sheet or tarpaulin was placed, where the men could wash under a shower consisting of a "tin drum on top of a wooden scaffold erected," often the first opportunity to do so "for many weeks."

During ablutions parades, the soldiers washed themselves with between three pints and two gallons of water. On 8 May an ablution parade was conducted by the 3rd Light Horse Brigade near the horse troughs, where 500 men were each issued two gallons of water, to wash themselves and their clothes, a further 500 attending the following day. On 28 August the 4th Light Horse Brigade conducted an ablution parade while at Abasan el Kebir. The men were given the whole day to wash their clothes, and bath themselves, a special area being set aside where tarpaulins covered a depression in the ground. Each regiment took its turn to wash in two gallons of water per man, "which is ample ... It is found to be a good scheme." The 179th Brigade, 60th (London) Division were allowed three pints per man for washing.

==== Water ====
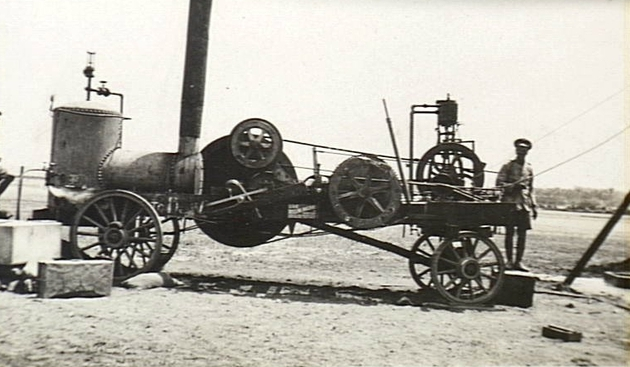
Drilling for water at Deir el Belah, used by Australian Engineers

The open low-lying country occupied by the EEF was cut by deep wadis which contained many pools of good water, even when relatively dry. In the Wadi Ghazza 3,000 feet (910 m) of watering troughs were constructed for horses and camels. Less desirable ground water was also available. On the eastern bank of the Wadi Ghazza at Shellal, a gushing spring of salty but clear water gave the troops who regularly drank it "stomach troubles."

At Khan Yunis wells produced 100,000 gallons of water a day for the EEF. The springs at Esani and Shellal were developed to give about 14,000 gallons an hour, and 500,000 gallons were stored in a natural rock basin. The wells at Deir el Belah were connected up with the trenches south of Gaza. Pumping stations were erected, and deep bore wells sunk at intervals.

The pumping plant at El-Qantarah supplied 600,000 gallons each day to Romani where 100,000 gallons were required by the town and the railway. The pumping plant at Romani supplied 480,000 to El Abd where 75,000 gallons were required by the town and the troops stationed there. The pumping plant at El Abd pumped 405,000 gallons to Mazar where 75,000 gallons were required by the railway and troops. The pumping plant at Mazar pumped 330,000 gallons to El Arish where 100,000 gallons were required by the railway and troops. El Arish distributed 230,000 gallons to the area east of the town while 100,000 gallons were shipped by railway to Deir el Belah. The pumping plant at El Arish pumped 130,000 gallons on to Rafa where 93,500 gallons were required for the railway, leaving 36,500 gallons available. On 1 May 1917 the pipeline reached Abasan el Kebir making it possible to establish a training and staging area nearby.

A pipeline was laid from Shellal to Imara and pumps installed, while the pipeline from El-Qantarah was connected up with Shellal, where an area was established for filling and loading 200 fantasses (small iron tanks) onto camels.

==== Medical support ====
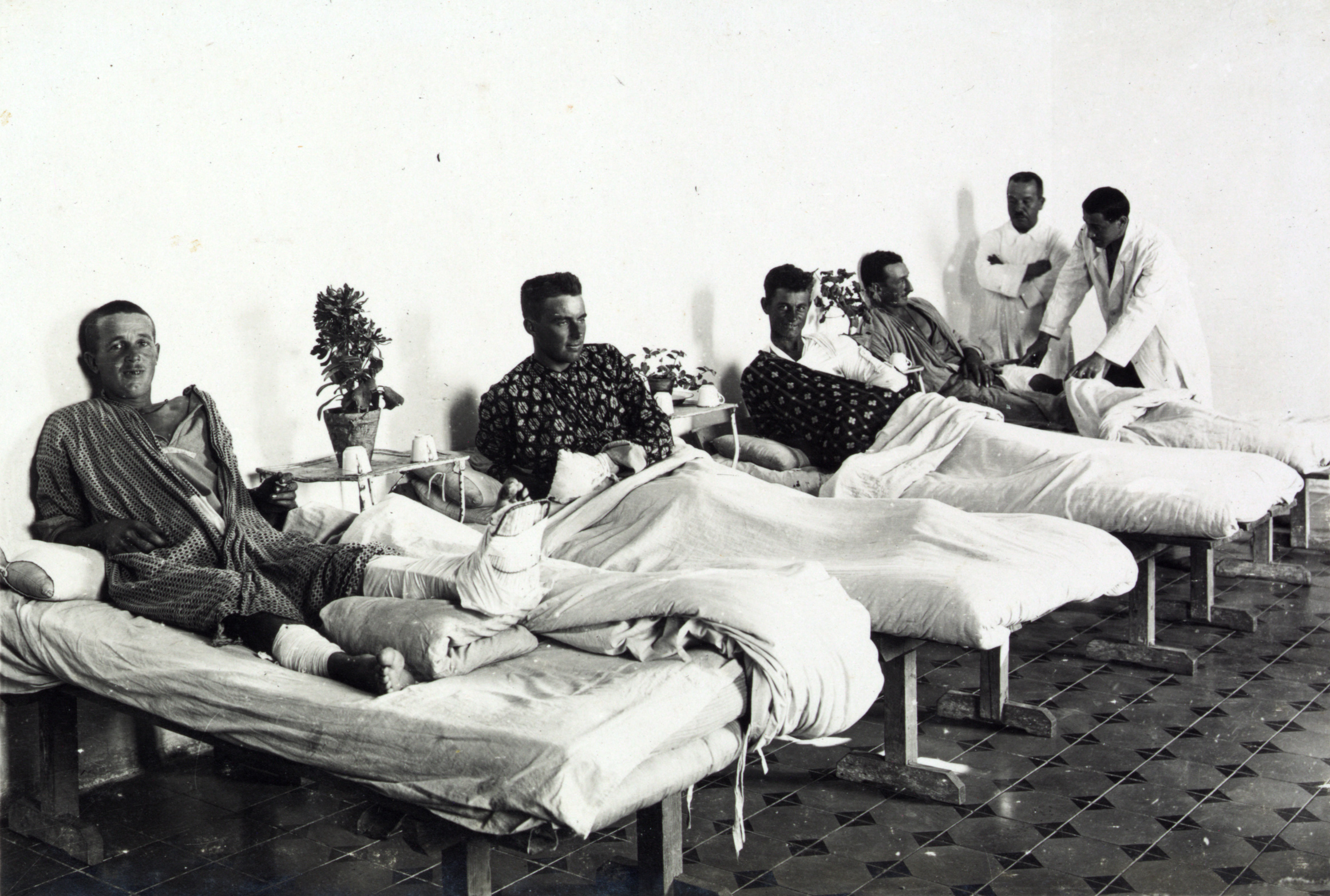
Wounded British prisoners in the Ottoman hospital at Beersheba on 29 October 1917, two days before the "Grand Attack"

The daily "Sick Parade", in the case of the 4th Light Horse Field Ambulance, was carried out in the Tent Division by the duty medical officer (MO), with a staff sergeant assisting, when immediate treatment in the form of pills, dressings, etc., was prescribed. The pills, handed out and normally taken on the spot, were identified by number, so the MO might say, "Two number-3 and one number-9." The Number Nine pills became famous: "The pill that will" and "Never known to fail!" Septic sores, boils, cuts, bruises, abrasions, sore eyes, sprained ankles, damaged hands and feet were dressed by the hospital staff. The MO would then decide to return the patient to his unit, admit him for a day or two to the Field Hospital, or evacuate him to a hospital in the rear.

The Tent Division also provided immediate treatment for the wounded: redressing all wounds, and performing emergency surgery. The division ran the Field Hospital, consisting of between one and four hospital tents, each accommodating up to 14 patients, where men lay on mattresses either on the ground or on light, wicker supports, or on stretchers. (Note: Patrick Hamilton was the Medical Sergeant in Charge of Tent Division from 4 September to 26 October 1917. [Hamilton 1996 p. 52])

== EEF operations, April to June ==
During these months a war of attrition developed, with small scale ground and air attacks made on the opposing trenches, while reconnaissance patrols were carried out by mounted units on the open eastern flank.

=== Trench warfare ===
According to Falls, "numerous raids on the pattern of those familiar on the Western Front" were carried out. (Note: Trench warfare during the stalemate was also compared to the Gallipoli campaign, where British Empire attacks on Ottoman trenches were very costly. [Erickson 2001 p. 160]) However, it was necessary to conduct almost all activities at night because of the intense daytime heat. Lieutenant R.H. Goodsall, assigned to the 74th Division, recounts that between 10:00 and 16:00 "the heat produced what the men called a 'mirage,' and rifle fire under such conditions was apt to be erratic ... By a sort of natural agreement, both sides shut down the war until the hours of dusk and darkness." Then trenches were raided and fighting under exploding star shells and flares in no man's land occurred, while repairs and improvements to trenches were made, barbed wire strung, communication trenches widened, cables buried, and gun emplacements constructed.

On 18 May EEF "offensive patrolling" began with the bombing of Ottoman trenches on Umbrella Hill to the west of the Rafa to Gaza road. An Ottoman attack on an EEF post on 5 June, killed or captured an entire section of the 5th Battalion, Royal Scots Fusiliers (155th Brigade, 52nd Division). This loss was "avenged" during the evening of 11 June, by the 5th Battalion, Kings Own Scottish Borderers (155th Brigade), which attacked an Ottoman post on the Mediterranean shore. Here they took 12 wounded prisoner, leaving at least 50 killed without loss to the attackers.

After a feint attack with dummy figures, which diverted Ottoman fire opposite Umbrella Hill, a "long series of raids" by the 52nd (Lowland), the 53rd (Welsh), and the 54th (East Anglian) Divisions were carried out. Although they were not all completely successful, they resulted in "the establishment of a definite British superiority in No Man's Land."

=== Mounted patrols ===
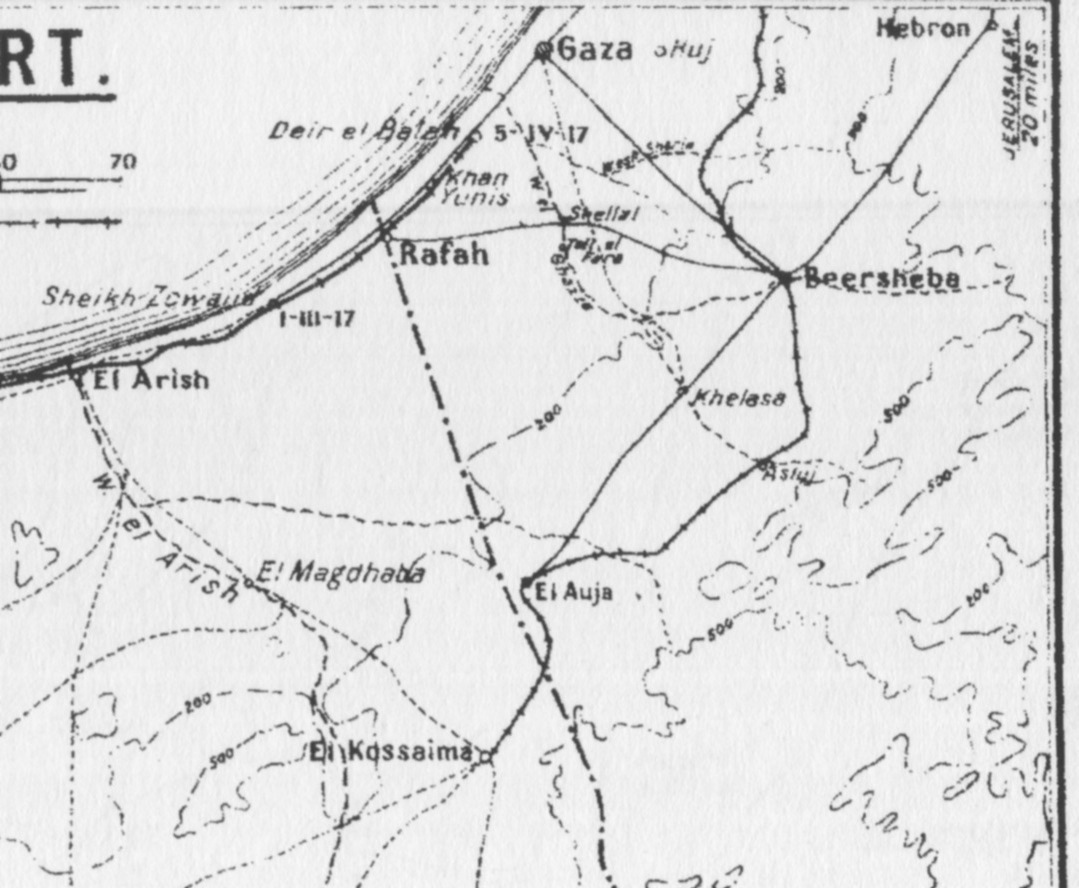
On the edge of the Eastern Desert

During the stalemate, EFF mounted patrols, outpost work, and reconnaissances were conducted, mainly towards Hareira and Beersheba. These patrols and reconnaissances, by forces up to the size of a brigade, took place day and night, when skirmishes and surprise attacks were launched, traps set for hostile patrols, and raids were made on the lines of communication. Mounted patrols were frequently attacked by Ottoman cavalry. From the height of Tel el Fara, these attacks could be seen and the shots heard across the open country. The area was renamed "the racecourse."

With only two divisions in the Desert Column at this time, the Anzac and Imperial Mounted Divisions took turns to hold the front line. On 20 May while the Imperial Mounted Division was in reserve near Abasan el Kebir, the Anzac Mounted Division was responsible for patrolling the region from the direction of Sausage Ridge to Goz el Basal and then to the west of Goz Mabruk. The Anzac Mounted Division provided night standing patrols at important parts of the line, while one brigade held Nos. 1 to 6 defences at El Sha'uth defences, as well as the El Ghabi to El Gamli entrenchments.

Immediately a hostile advance in any strength was reported, the General Officer Commanding Anzac Mounted Division was to send one brigade through Goz el Basal towards Im Siri and El Buqqar, and another brigade southwards towards Esani, to establish the strength of the attack and degree of seriousness. The remainder of Anzac Mounted Division, less one regiment holding the line of works from El Ghabi to Gamli, was to advance at once to Jezariye to take action on the basis of the report.

Towards the end of May an attack was made on an Ottoman force protecting barley harvesters. A quick galloping exchange of rifle fire with the Ottoman cavalry drove off the cavalry and the harvesters.

==== Day patrols ====
Day patrols usually started with "stand-to" at about 03:00, with the force subsequently riding out over arid, dusty country, to patrol a designated area, before returning after dark. (Note: On 18 June, the 03:30 "stand-to" ceased, when orders were issued that all units were to instead be ready to "turnout at half an hours notice." [4th Light Horse Brigade War Diary 18, 20 June 1917 AWM4-10-4-6]) During these patrols, in addition to attacks from cavalry, aerial bombing was a constant danger. After a patrol, outpost duty might follow the next night.

On 24 April, a squadron of the 7th Light Horse Regiment (3rd light Horse Brigade), surrounded and captured a troop of Ottoman cavalry 5 miles (8.0 km) from Shellal. On 2 May, a patrol of the New Zealand Mounted Rifle Brigade reported gaining touch with about a squadron of hostile cavalry, while a patrol towards Sausage Ridge by the 2nd Light Horse Brigade, reported gaining touch with a hostile patrol at Munkeileh.

On 9 June, the 4th Light Horse Brigade rode out to occupy a line south, southeast, east and northeast of Esani, when their advanced guard forced 12 Ottoman mounted troopers out of Karm, and another 20 troopers out of Rashid Bek. A further 70 Ottoman cavalry and 10 camel-men were seen 2 miles (3.2 km) southeast of Rashid Bek.

==== Night patrols ====
Night patrols were left out in no man's land, after day patrols and longer reconnaissances, to keep watch in case of surprise attacks. The patrol would ride out, guided only by compass, to establish nighttime listening posts, where some dismounted to move close to Ottoman positions to listen for and note all movements. Others tested for water sources, examined Ottoman trenches and tracks in the area, or verified aerial reports. These night patrols consisted of one officer and 12 other ranks.

On 9 May, the 74th Division reported 300 Ottoman soldiers digging in on the west bank of the Wadi Imleih. An officers' patrol from the 2nd Light Horse Brigade, ordered to "clear up [the] situation", found the area "all clear" the next morning. Other officers' night patrols occurred when the all clear was reported on 12 May and 26 June.

==== Fortnightly mounted reconnaissances in force ====
Fortnightly reconnaissances towards Beersheba, carried out by Desert Column (subsequently Desert Mounted Corps), were conducted in force. They were seen to be valuable opportunities to become familiar with the "somewhat intricate ground towards Beersheba," on the basis of which strategies could be developed for a future attack. It was also thought that these regular, repetitious reconnaissances in force, would make the Ottoman defenders slow to recognise the real thing, when it came. The enemy press was especially credulous: Preston writes, "the enemy made a determined attack on Beersheba with about seventy squadrons supported by artillery. After heavy fighting, the hostile forces were defeated and driven right back to their original positions, having suffered important losses."

These major operations, of 36 hours duration, would begin in the afternoon, continue all the first night and following day, and would be completed during the following night. A division would ride out in the afternoon, arriving at dawn the next morning to occupy a line of outposts on high ground west of Beersheba. Behind this screen or outpost line, corps and divisional commanders in motor cars or on horseback, familiarised themselves with the ground. Major Hampton, commanding a squadron of Worcestershire Yeomanry, (5th Mounted Brigade, Imperial/Australian Mounted Division), noted: "It fell to the lot of my Squadron, among others, to provide protection and to act generally in the capacity of Messrs. Cook & Son."

During the day hostile shells and aerial bombing were often fired at this screen, often causing casualties from carefully registered, or pre-aimed, light guns. These Ottoman guns targeted the narrow wadi crossings, where it was necessary for the troopers to move in single file before establishing the screen on the high ground, which was also carefully targeted and registered. The majority of the local population was also hostile, and took every opportunity to fire on the EEF with arms supplied by the Ottoman Empire. Lieutenant C.H. Perkins, Royal Buckinghamshire Hussars (6th Mounted Brigade, Imperial/Australian Mounted Division) commented, "The lack of anti-aircraft guns was also unpleasant when the dust of the cavalry moved into 'no man's land' prompted the appearance of Fritz in his German Taube planes."

Once the commanders had completed their work and withdrawn, the division rode back during the night, watering the horses at Esani on the way to Shellal. The mounted regiments often covered 70 miles (110 km) or more, during 36 sleepless hours when daytime temperatures of 110 °F (43 °C) (in the shade) were common, while riding through dusty, rough and rocky, desert country infested with flies.

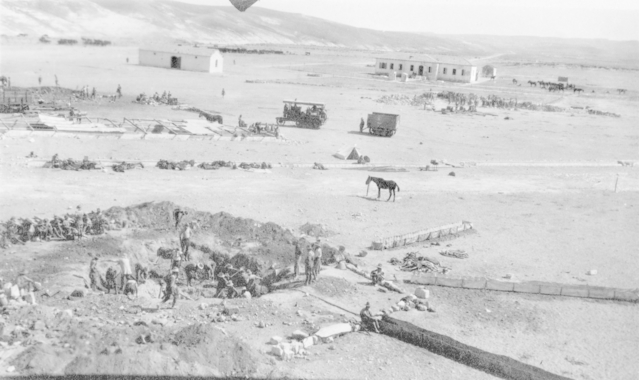
Water sources at Asluj being repaired and developed

During these long reconnaissances sappers, attached to the mounted division, surveyed the whole area of No-Man's-Land, marking and improving many of the Wadi Ghazza crossings, and developing the water supply at Esani in the Wadi Ghazza. They also reconnoitred the water sources at Khalasa and Asluj, subsequently repairing the damaged wells before the planned main offensive.

===== Problems associated with long reconnaissances in force =====
While the men started with full water bottles, and got one refill from regimental water-carts, during these dangerous, tedious and exhausting operations, there was no water available for the horses, from "the afternoon of the day on which the division moved out till the evening of the following day." As a result the horses lost condition and needed a week to ten days to recover, although the practice had been adopted, during the stalemate, of watering the horses once a day. This was because of the long distance to go for water, the heat, the dust, and the flies. The horses' recovery would have also been compromised by lack of opportunities for grazing during the reconnaissance across barren country.

On 4 May, the GOC Imperial Mounted Division inspected the horses of the 5th Mounted Brigade, which were found to be in a "very poor and weak condition due, it is thought, to too much feeding on ripe barley and shortage of good forage." Although the Australian horses were generally "better looking horses" they "did not stand up to hardship as did the New Zealand-bred stock." The Australian light horsemen "became very good horsemasters," the New Zealand mounted riflemen were "excellent horsemen and horsemasters" and their horses were "exceptionally well-selected," while the mounted yeomanry were mostly inexperienced. The veterinary staff of the Anzac Mounted Division collected together knowledge gained during their advance across the Sinai Peninsula in a small brochure on horse management published in Egypt.

After a long reconnaissance on 14 June, a conference of brigade commanders, at Imperial Mounted Divisional headquarters the next day, decided to carry out minor operations with smaller formations in the future, because of the heat and visibility of the large formations.

==== Raid to Kossaima and El Auja ====
A raid was conducted between 7 and 14 May, by Nos. 2 and 16 Companies of the Imperial Camel Corps Brigade with a detachment of engineer field troop, and two motor ambulances from the Lines of Communication Defences. They rode from the Lines of Communications Defences to Kossaima and El Auja, destroying wells in the area, before capturing five Ottoman railway men.

==== Raid to Hafir el Auja railway ====
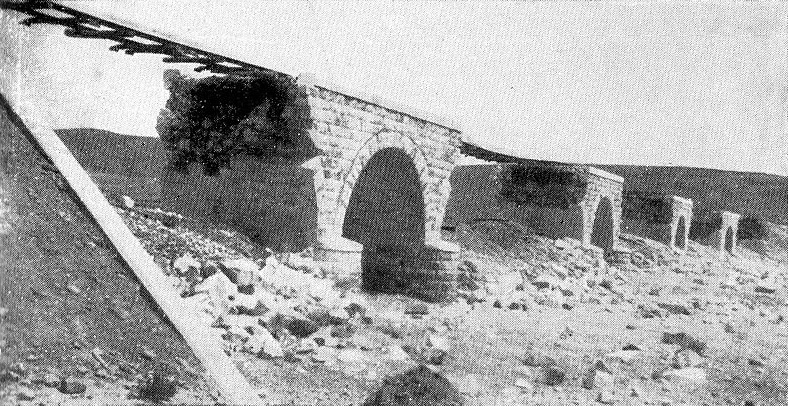
Eighteen Arch bridge at Asluj after demolition

After the raid by the Imperial Camel Corps Brigade, orders were issued for a raid, to be conducted between 22 and 23 May, on the Ottoman railway between Asluj and Hafir el Auja, to the south of Beersheba. This large-scale raid was made by specially formed demolition squadrons from the field squadrons of the Anzac and the Imperial Mounted Divisions, with the 1st light Horse Brigade providing cover, and the remainder of the Anzac Mounted Division deployed to watch for the approach of Ottoman forces from Beersheba. The Imperial Mounted Division and the Imperial Camel Corps Brigade were also deployed to cover the raid, which was completely successful. The demolition squadrons blew up 15 miles (24 km) of railway line as well as severely damaging a number of stone railway bridges and viaducts.

==== El Buqqar strategic marches in May and June ====
On 5 May, patrols by the New Zealand Mounted Rifle Brigade reported, having reached a line west of El Girheir to Im Siri and Kh. Khasif, when hostile posts were seen on the line near Kh. Imleih and El Buqqar. Two days later the area was reported clear of the enemy.

Patrols reported Ottoman units occupying El Buqqar, Kh. Khasif and Im Siri at night, and withdrawing before EEF patrols arrived in the morning. In an attempt to capture these Ottoman units, the 3rd Light Horse Brigade (Imperial Mounted Division) and one brigade from the Anzac Mounted Division, rode out on the evening of 6 May to occupy the El Buqqar and Khasif posts, with reserve units at El Gamli. Attacks were to be made at 04:00 on 7 May, but a heavy fog before dawn obstructed the attack. "That place [Buqqar] was well named."

On 10 May a 2,500 strong hostile column was reported on the Fara to Saba, also known as Beersheba, road, 2.5 miles (4.0 km) from Saba, by the RAF. A reconnaissance was carried out the next day to Goz el Basal on the Bir Saba road, and to El Buqqar. When they were 1 mile (1.6 km) east of El Buqqar, they were stopped by hostile fire. As the light horsemen withdrew they left out the usual night patrols to keep watch.

On 2 June a loud explosion was heard, and the 12th Light Horse Regiment (less one squadron but with one squadron from the 4th Light Horse Regiment attached) with two sections of Machine Gun Squadron, was sent to locate the cause. They found a large water cistern at Kh Khasif had been blown up and destroyed. On their way back they encountered Ottoman cavalry near Karm which they pushed back, until they came within range of a strongly defended Ottoman line, held by two squadrons of cavalry and 200 infantry.

A strategic march was made to El Buqqar on 6 June, when a line north of Im Siri, Beit Abu Taha and El Buqqar was established at 04:00 on 7 June. With the intention of surprising and capturing Ottoman patrols, one officer and 40 other ranks from the 9th Light Horse Regiment (3rd Light Horse Brigade), supported by a squadron of 3rd Light Horse Regiment (1st Light Horse Brigade), remained in the vicinity of Karm (also known as Qamle) overnight. This attempted ambush was unsuccessful.

After standing-to at 03:30 on 14 June, the 4th Light Horse Brigade rode out at 10:00 to hold a line from Hill 680 to El Buqqar to Hill 720. As the brigade took up their positions, a screen of between 150 and 200 Ottoman soldiers was established 1.5 miles (2.4 km) east of the light-horse line. During the day two prisoners were captured before the brigade withdrew, arriving back at the Wadi Ghazza at 20:00.

On 24 June the 5th Mounted Brigade rode out to conduct operations west of the line Hill 720 to El Buqqar to Rasid Bek, with one squadron of the 4th Light Horse Brigade covering their left flank. The next day they encountered some opposition when the Yeomanry post on Hill 300 was threatened by 100 Ottoman cavalry. One man was taken prisoner, while one man was killed and another seriously wounded by shell fire. The 4th Light Horse Regiment forced the Ottoman cavalry to withdraw back to the Wadi Imleh. At 20:00 two officers patrols from the 11th Light Horse Regiment (4th Light Horse Brigade), consisting of one officer and 12 other ranks each, rode to Point 550 north of Kasif, and to .75 miles (1.21 km) south of Kasif, to locate and destroy hostile posts or patrols in the area. They remained out all night, returning only when the day patrols got into position, reporting all clear with no sign of any patrols or posts.

=== Aerial bombing raids ===
As the artillery battle diminished after the Second Battle of Gaza, aerial bombing raids increased. Many of these were carried out in moonlight, which was "almost as bright as day."

The visibility of objects from the air at night was the subject of a report issued to all Imperial Mounted Division brigades. The report, written by the Officer Commanding 5th Wing, Royal Flying Corps, noted how "the broad outline of country" was visible and contrasting areas of light water and dark land, made the coast "unmistakable." The contrast between dark trees and white tents made them easily visible, as were sandy roads and the sandy bed of wadis, even in sandy country. Lights were "[v]isible under all conditions" and fires could "be seen from a great distance." At night, movements of large forces raised very little dust, and it was very difficult to recognise movement from the air, "except in the case of a close formation marching along a road and interrupting the white line of road."

Every precaution was to be taken against aerial attacks. Mounted formations should adopt open formations and move off tracks or roads. Camouflaging tents with khaki and dark green paint, was suggested. "Hospitals should have a cross with red lamps, the lights now used not being sufficiently distinctive. Hospitals should not be within .25 miles (0.40 km) of justifiable targets as the red lights form a good landmark and bomb dropping from a height is apt to be inaccurate."

==== German air raids ====
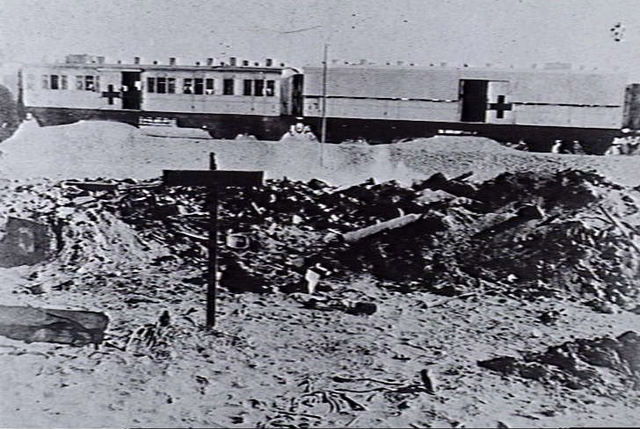
May 1917 at Deir el Belah. Wreckage from German bombing of the Casualty Clearing Stations at Belah Hospital. The Red Cross on the left marks the location of the former dispensary. There are two railway carriages of a Hospital Train in background

After the Second Battle of Gaza, the immobile sections of the 52nd (Lowland), 53rd (Welsh), 54th (East Anglian), Anzac Mounted and Imperial Mounted Divisions' five field ambulances, returned to camp at Deir el Belah near their casualty clearing stations. During the night of 3/4 May, a hostile night-time air raid, in full moonlight, bombed the Immobile Section of the 4th Light Horse Field Ambulance Hospital. "The moonlight here is almost as bright as day. A low flying plane can see the tents quite easily, even with lights out." Three patients and two field ambulance personnel were killed, two dental staff sergeants, a lieutenant, and a field ambulance member were wounded. (Note: At the time, Hamilton was Sergeant-in-charge of the Bearers with the 4th Light Horse Field Ambulance. [Hamilton 1996 p. 31])

A second air raid at 22:00 the next night, again in brilliant moonlight, flew low to drop bombs and machine-gun the casualty clearing stations at Deir el Belah, which were caring for about 100 casualties, and were clearly marked with Red Cross ground sheets. The attack killed six and wounded nine in the 3rd Light Horse Field Ambulance, while one patient was killed and four orderlies wounded in the 2nd Light Horse Field Ambulance. The next night another air raid caused 13 casualties. "The Turks are out bombing every night, while this bright moonlight lasts ... Two enemy planes came over and dropped twelve bombs. We cleared out into our funk holes, but no damage done."

An air raid on Kantara, on 25 May, attempted to blow up a section of the EEF lines of communication. Hostile soldiers, in an Aviatik aircraft which they landed near Salmana, were stopped from blowing up the railway line by guards from the British West Indies Regiment.

==== EEF air raids ====
EFF aircraft retaliated for the bombing of Kantara by dropping four times the bombs, and the attempt to blow up a section of the EEF lines of communication, on 30 May, was answered with the EFF bombing of camps and aerodromes near Hareira.

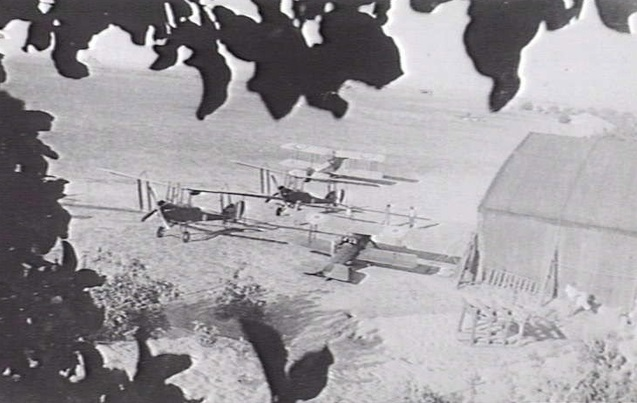
No. 1 Squadron, Australian Flying Corps at Deir el Belah Airfield in 1917. Aircraft are (from left) a Martinsyde, two B.E.2Es and a Bristol Scout.

Eight EEF aircraft conducted an air raid on Jerusalem, on 26 June, bombing the Ottoman Fourth Army headquarters on the Mount of Olives. As the aircraft were flying home, first the engine of a B. E. aircraft seized, followed by another southeast of Beersheba. After successfully picking up the airmen from the first aircraft, which was destroyed, the attempted rescue of the second led to two aircraft being wrecked and three survivors walking across No Man's Land to the safety of a light horse outpost line. Two aircraft overflying the survivors on their walk ran out of petrol and oil near Khalasa. The pilots left their intact aircraft, hoping to return to salvage them. Three Australian Flying Corps officers walked in to Goz Mabruk post from southwest of Esani at 15:00 on 26 June after their forced landings, and the 3rd Light Horse Brigade was ordered to retrieve the two aircraft. The aircraft were located near Naga el Aseisi, southwest of Bir el Asani, and a regiment of the 5th Mounted Brigade was sent to guard the aircraft during the night of 26/27 June. Under the command of Lieutenant Colonel Maygar, the 8th and 9th Light Horse Regiments (3rd Light Horse Brigade) with three troops from the Machine Gun Squadron, one Section Field Ambulance and a detachment from the RFC, moved out from Tel el Fara at 03:30 to retrieve the aircraft on 27 June. They travelled across sand hills, with intervening areas of hard ground, to take over from the regiment of the 5th Mounted Brigade at 08:00. A bag of tools and a sketch showing the places where the two machine guns, camera, and ammunition had been buried near the Martinsyde, were dropped at 07:30 from an aircraft which flew out from Deir el Belah airfield. The guns, camera and ammunition had been dug up by Bedouin during the night. Both aircraft were badly damaged, except for the engines which were salvaged.

A long-distance air raid, from El Arish to Ma'an, was ordered by Brigadier General W. G. H. Salmond, commander of the Middle East RFC at the time of the Second Battle of Gaza, during which three aircraft flew over 150 miles (240 km) of arid desert. The aircraft succeeded in bombing the railway station buildings and destroying material and supplies in the area before safely flying back to El Arish. A forced landing could have been fatal, if the rations and water they carried, ran out before rescue. On arrival over Ma'an, the low-flying aircraft dropped 32 bombs on and around the railway station, eight bombs hitting the railway engine shed, damaging plant and stock. Another four bombs were dropped over the aerodrome, two bombs damaging the barracks, killing 35, and wounding 50, Ottoman soldiers. Although they returned safely to Kuntilla, north of Akaba, the aircraft had been damaged by hostile fire. Yet the next day all three aircraft flew to Aba el Lissan, where they dropped more bombs over a large Ottoman camp, damaging tents and the horse-lines, and causing a stampede. They returned to Kuntilla before noon, having sustained more damage from hostile fire. They dropped a further 30 bombs in the afternoon, on an anti-aircraft battery which was silenced, and on Ottoman soldiers and animals, before the aircraft began their return journey back to El Arish.

Seven aircraft bombed Ramleh and a Royal Naval Air Service (RNAS) squadron attacked Tulkarm in the Judean Hills on 23 June.

=== Aerial dog fights begin ===
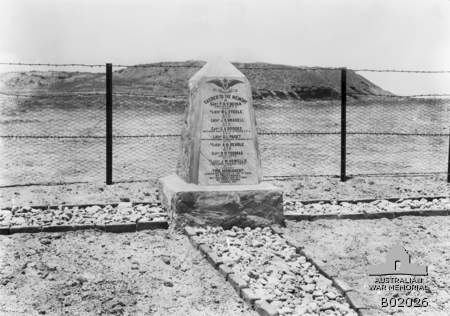
Memorial erected by German airmen at Sheria, in memory of British and Australian airmen, killed in their lines

During 1916, aerial reconnaissance patrols had most often been unaccompanied, as there had been little if any aerial disputes between the belligerents. However, just as the ground war on the Gaza to Beersheba line came to resemble trench warfare on the western front, so too did the air war over southern Palestine come to resemble that being fought over France. By April 1917 the growing concentration of forces holding established front lines, the development of associated supply dumps and lines of communications, and the need to know about these developments, fuelled "intense rivalry in the air."

After the Second Battle of Gaza the German aircraft were technically superior, resulting, during May, in a number of EEF aircraft being shot down. Aerial reconnaissance patrols were regularly attacked, so it was necessary for all photography and artillery observation patrols to be accompanied by escort aircraft. These patrol escorts, eventually growing to squadron-size, accompanied and protected EEF reconnaissance aircraft, attacking hostile aircraft wherever they were found, either in the air or on the ground.

During a ground operation by two regiments of the 6th Mounted Brigade and two regiments of the New Zealand Mounted Rifles Brigade on 16 May, sent to check on 500 Ottoman cavalry seen near Kh. Khasif, a Bristol Scout was shot down by an Aviatik and the pilot wounded. The pilot was brought in, and the aircraft salvaged and sent to Rafa aerodrome. On 25 June during an EEF reconnaissance patrol near Tel esh Sheria, a newly arrived B. E. 12.a aircraft was shot down behind Ottoman lines.

== EEF reinforcements in May and June ==
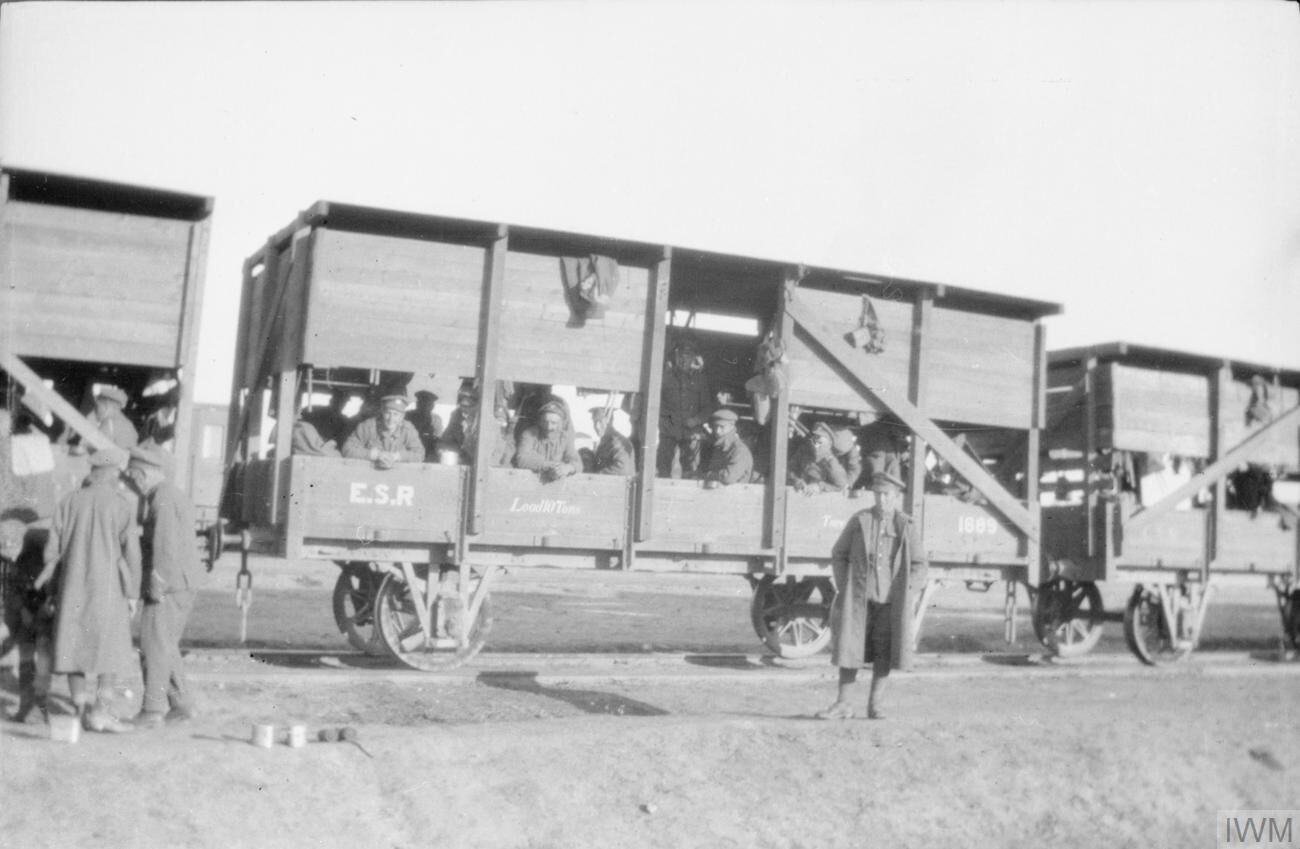
Troop train

After the first and second battles for Gaza, large reinforcements would be needed "to set General Murray's army in motion again." Murray made it clear to the War Cabinet and the Imperial General Staff, early in May, that he could not invade Palestine without reinforcements. He was informed by the War Office in the same month, that he should prepare for reinforcements that would increase the EEF to six infantry and three mounted divisions.

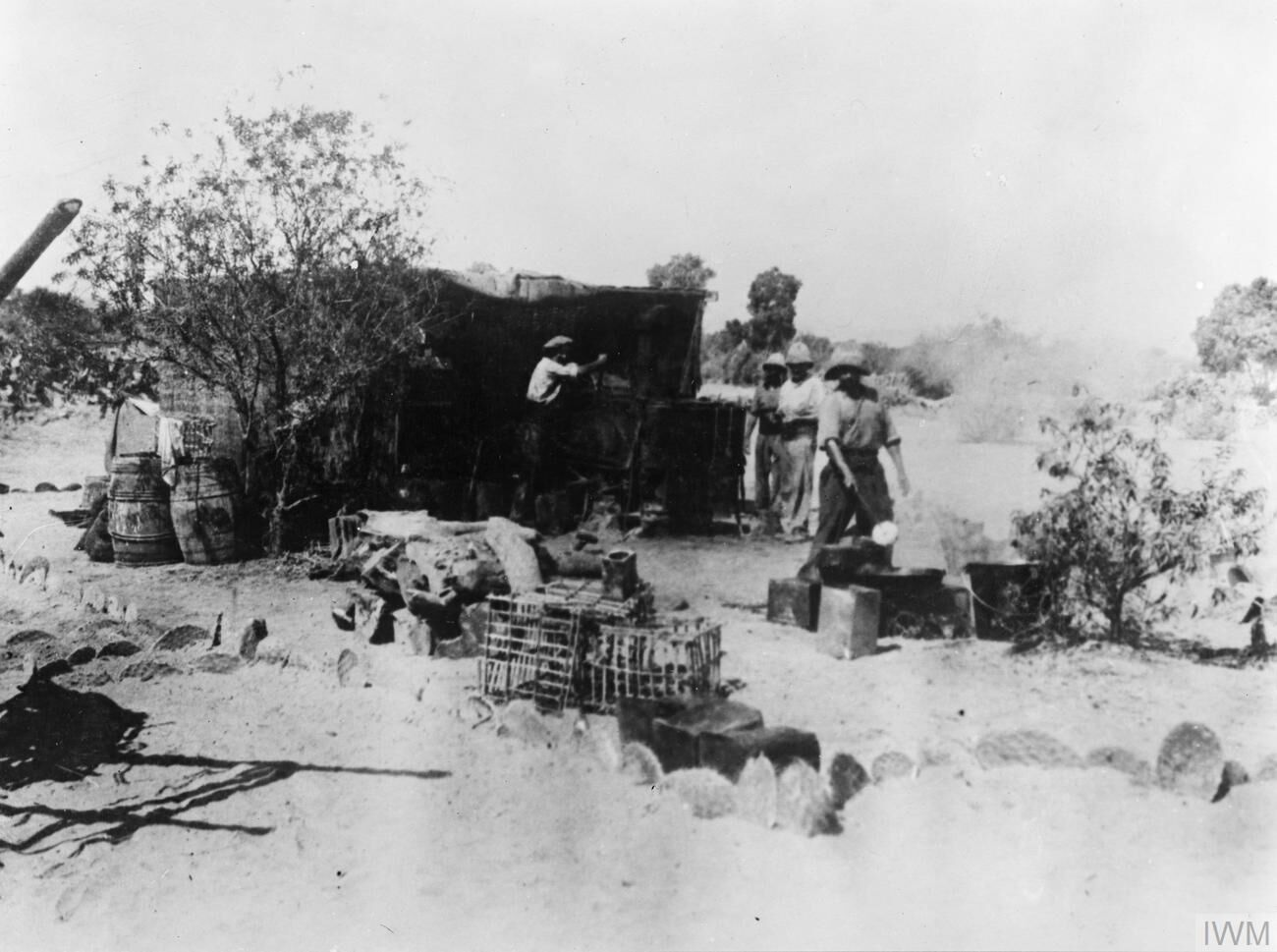
A field kitchen of the French Detachment de Palestine et Syrie at Khan Yunis on 11 September 1917

On 25 May a French detachment, the Détachement Français de Palestine et de Syrie (D.F.P.S.), consisting of three infantry battalions (5/115th Territorial Regiment, 7/1st and 9/2nd Algerian Tirailleurs), with cavalry and artillery, engineers and medical units, arrived at Rafa, followed by an Italian detachment of 500 Bersaglieri on 13 June. These forces were attached to the EEF for "mainly political," reasons. The French had "claimed special rights in Palestine and Syria," which were acknowledged in the Sykes-Picot Agreement where Britain's claim on Palestine and France's claim on Syria were agreed to. The Italian Agreement of Saint-Jean-de-Maurienne asserting Italy's claim to "hereditary ecclesiastical prerogatives ... at Jerusalem and Bethlehem," was also agreed to.

The 60th (London) Division along with the 7th and 8th Mounted Brigades were transferred from Salonika; and the 75th Division was formed in Egypt from battalions from India and units already in Egypt. The 60th (London) Division began to arrive on 14 June, with the 7th and 8th Mounted Brigades arriving in June and early July.

If we had been asked yesterday, 'Is it possible to discover a worse situated, a more inconvenient, or a more unholy spot in the world than your late rest camp in Macedonia?' We would have unanimously replied 'No, it cannot be possible.' Today, however, we have not only changed our minds, but we have actually found this spot, and more than that, we are encamped upon it.

— Captain R. C. Case Royal Engineers, 313th Field Company, 60th (London) Division to "my dear people," 31 July 1917.

However, by July 5, 150 infantry and 400 yeomanry reinforcements were still needed to bring the infantry and mounted divisions back up to their pre-Gaza strength. Anzac Mounted Division wounded who had come to the end of their treatment either were returned to the front via the Australian and New Zealand Training Depot at Moascar after convalescence or were invalided home. Such triage was the responsibility of a standing board, made up of the senior physician and senior surgeon, at No. 14 Australian General Hospital. The board had been given a short tour of the Anzac Mounted Division, so they understood the conditions at the front the men would be returned to, which improved the "efficient use of man power."

=== Rest camp and leave ===
Tired troops were given leave to Cairo and rest camps. During leave on the "Palestine Riviera," Private John Bateman Beer, 2/22nd London Regiment, 181st Brigade, 60th (London) Division, wrote home describing the luxury of having several days to "lounge about" and the "treat" of going to bed "in pyjamas in a Bell Tent near the sea." He explained that living in the open in the desert with little water meant that a tent represented "quite a high form of living." He also enjoyed hearing a band playing during the day and in the evening, concert parties, the use of library and "bathing ad–lib." There were also competition sports, including tug–of-war, boxing, wrestling on horses and camels, rugby, and soccer. Football was also very popular. Horse and camel racing, including betting, took place on racecourses during leave. At Tel el Marakeb rest camp, concerts were performed by the band of the New Zealand Mounted Rifle Brigade, (which had remained at Moascar base camp with the brigade's training regiment during the Sinai campaign), the Light Horse's Pierrot Troupe, and the dismounted 74th (Yeomanry) Division's Palestine Pops (these yeomanry had also fought during the Gallipoli campaign, along with Anzac Mounted Division). The Auckland Mounted Rifles Regiment's "Wally" was very popular, along with the Palestine Pops' talented vocalists, comedians, and female impersonator.

On 6 September, 67 troopers marched out from the 4th Light Horse Brigade on their way to the Rest Camp at Port Said. Their nine-day leave to Cairo and Alexandria was partly spent traveling 100 miles (160 km) across the Sinai from El Arish to Kantara on the Suez Canal in a freight train. "During the night a chap from the Royal Artillery fell off, was run over and killed. At Kantara, I had a shower and a good breakfast at the YMCA centre, which caters for men on leave. Then caught an Egyptian train to Cairo. On arrival, booked in at the National Hotel and had a good clean up. After a splendid dinner, turned in early and slept soundly in a real bed with sheets!"

== Recall of Murray and installation of Allenby ==
On 11 June, General Murray received a telegram from the Secretary of State for War, informing him that General Edmund Allenby had been given command of the EEF, and was to replace him. There had been a lack of confidence in Murray since Romani, and the two failed Gaza battles increased his unpopularity among both the infantry and the mounted troops.

After the war Allenby acknowledged Murray's achievements in a June 1919 despatch in which he summed up his campaigns:

I desire to express my indebtedness to my predecessor, Lieutenant–General Sir A.J. Murray, who, by his bridging of the desert between Egypt and Palestine, laid the foundations for the subsequent advances of the Egyptian Expeditionary Force. I reaped the fruits of his foresight and strategical imagination, which brought the waters of the Nile to the borders of Palestine, planned the skilful military operations by which the Turks were driven from strong positions in the desert over the frontier of Egypt, and carried a standard gauge railway to the gates of Gaza. The organisation he created, both in Sinai and in Egypt, stood all tests and formed the corner–stone of my successes.

— General Allenby on 28 June 1919

== Desert Column reorganisation ==
Between Murray's recall in early June and the arrival of Allenby late in June, Chetwode, as commander of Eastern Force, gave Chauvel, as commander of Desert Column, oversight for the establishment of the Yeomanry Mounted Division, made possible by the arrival of the 7th and 8th Mounted Brigades from Salonika. (Note: It may have been Murray who decided on the establishment of the third mounted division, but the brigades did not arrive until after Murray had been recalled. The reorganisation of Desert Column was complete before Allenby arrived at the end of the month. [Falls 1930 Vol. 1 p. 357])

The decision to transfer the 7th and 8th Mounted Brigades from Macedonia in May and June 1917, recognised the "value of mounted troops on this front." However, in May 1917 a lieutenant in the 5th Mounted Brigade opined:

Cavalry warfare is about over I think ... They can't say we haven't done our share – we have taken every inch of ground this side of Kantara ... and I should think I have ridden on an average the whole distance at least three times – the infantry have simply followed us up.

— Lieutenant R.H. Wilson, Royal Gloucestershire Hussars Yeomanry (5th Mounted Brigade), 21 May 1917

Before Chauvel's reorganisation of Desert Column, it had consisted of the Anzac Mounted Division (commanded by Chetwode) comprising: the 1st and 2nd Light Horse brigades, the New Zealand Mounted Rifles Brigade, and the 22nd Mounted Brigade; and the Imperial Mounted Division (commanded by Hodgson), made up of the 3rd and 4th Light Horse Brigades, and 5th and 6th Mounted Brigades. (Note: The newly formed 4th Light Horse Brigade, consisting of the 4th, 11th and 12th Light Horse Regiments, had taken the field on 17 April 1917, just before the second battle of Gaza. [Falls 1930 Vol. 1 pp. 273–4, 332] Brigadier General William Grant took command of the 4th Light Horse Brigade on 13 September 1917. [12th Light Horse Regiment War Diary September 1917 AWM4-10-17-8]) The two new brigades brought the total number of brigades in the EEF up to 10. There was one mounted rifle, four light horse and five mounted brigades. Chauvel reorganised them into three mounted divisions.

On 21 June, the Imperial Mounted Division became the Australian Mounted Division, still commanded by Hodgson. On 26 June, the 6th Mounted Brigade was transferred from the Australian Mounted Division, and the 22nd Mounted Brigade from the Anzac Mounted Division, and along with the recently arrived 8th Mounted Brigade, formed the Yeomanry Mounted Division (commanded by Major General G. de S. Barrow, who had also just arrived from France). The 7th Mounted Brigade's two regiments were attached to Desert Column troops. (Note: The 7th Mounted Brigade, consisting of two regiments with the Essex Battery RHA, was commanded directly by Chetwode's Eastern Force headquarters. [Wavell 1968 p. 91] Army Troops became a regular attachment to Desert Column. [Bou 2009 p. 165] Army Troops also included the Imperial Camel Corps Brigade supported by Australian Camel Field Ambulance from 2 June 1917. [Bou 2009 p. 165, Downes 1938 pp. 629–30])

Desert Column, after the reorganisation from two mounted divisions of four brigades to three mounted divisions of three brigades, consisted of:

Anzac Mounted Division, commanded by Chaytor

1st and 2nd Light Horse, New Zealand Mounted Rifles Brigades, XXVIII Brigade RHA (18-pounders)

Australian (late Imperial) Mounted Division, commanded by Major General H.W. Hodgson

3rd and 4th Light Horse, 5th Mounted Brigades, XIX Brigade RHA (18-pdrs)

Yeomanry Mounted Division, commanded by Major General Barrow.

6th, 8th, and 22nd Mounted Brigades, XX Brigade RHA (13-pdrs). The batteries in Desert Column consisted of four guns each. (Note: Murray had suggested to the Australian government, in June 1917, the formation of a 5th Light Horse Brigade, but this was not possible, because the Australian volunteer recruitment policy could not attract sufficient recruits at that time. [Downes 1938 p. 628] Allenby states that General Robertson "refused to sanction the formation of a 5th Australian Light Horse Brigade; on the score of lack of horses," although he stated horses were available in Australia, and he requested Robertson reconsider the issue. [Allenby to Robertson 19 July 1917 quoted in Hughes 2004 p. 40])

On 22 June Chetwode, commanding Eastern Force, complained to the chief of the EEF's general staff, saying the regular troopers' "movements are 'heavy' and they have no snap about them." Further, while recognising previous successes, Anzac Mounted Division headquarters wrote to subordinate brigades on 30 July, advising that commanders needed to travel well forward, so they could be in a position to make informed decisions quickly. Commanders were discouraged from dismounting the men some distance from hostile forces, when long–range firefights could prove ineffective, and a waste of ammunition. They were also discouraged from attempts to maintain contact across an extended frontage, when gaps in the line during offensive operations by mounted formations were not important, provided "all know the general plan and work to it under one command." (Note: Bou refers to Chetwode and Chauvel as authors of this report, but Chaytor and the staff of the Anzac Mounted Division would have been involved, as it is an Anzac Mounted Division document. [Bou 2009 p. 167])

Chauvel regularly inspected all Desert Column's fighting units, rest camps, hospitals, schools, and troops in training, often travelling in a Ford car.

=== Deployment of three mounted divisions ===
While static trench warfare continued to be fought by infantry in the central and western sections of the entrenched lines south of Gaza, the three divisions in Desert Column were rotated each month in succession, in three different areas of the open eastern flank. While one division was deployed to aggressively defend the disputed, wide No Man's Land area by patrolling towards Hareira and Beersheba, a second division was in reserve, in training in the rear near Abasan el Kebir. These two divisions lived in bivouacs, with both ready to move out to battle in 30 minutes, while the third division rested on the Mediterranean coast, at Tel el Marakeb. The divisions were rotated every four weeks, when the front line division would march to the coast, having been relieved by the division which had been training. The rotations were necessary to maintain the health and morale of the troops during the summer in this occupied territory, the inhabitants of which were either "indifferent or openly hostile." These whole-unit rotations differed from the intra-unit rotations employed in France, where a part of a unit's strength would serve on the front line, while commanders rested and trained other sections of their formations.

The strongly wired and entrenched line, from the Mediterranean Sea to Shellal and Tel el Fara on the Wadi Ghazza, was extended eastwards to Gamli by a lightly entrenched defensive line, behind which most of the mounted troops were concentrated to the south and southeast of Gaza. Gamli was held for a month by a mounted division, which manned the daily outposts, carried out extended patrols, and conducted fortnightly-long reconnaissances into No Man's Land at the end of the line. While one division was in no man's land on reconnaissance, the two other divisions covered this deployment by moving up towards Shellal and Abasan el Kebir respectively.

=== Rotations ===
On 25 May orders were received by the Anzac Mounted Division for the 2nd Light Horse Brigade to be relieved by the 53rd (Welsh) Division at Shauth defences on 27 May. The Anzac division was relieved on 28 May by the Imperial Mounted Division.

[Early in July, the 4th Light Horse Field Ambulance were ordered to] move out at once ... We rode fast to Gamli crossing and straight on for 6 miles (9.7 km). Then came back to the wadi, watered and rested till 3 am next morning. Moved forward again and stood to till midday, then straight back to camp by 4 pm. Took 20 horses to Khan Yunas to pick up some reinforcements. A lot of riding and coming and going. I was pleased to get eight new men for the bearer lines. Next morning we struck camp, cleaned up and moved over to a new site on the beach, and put down horse lines. Our Immobile section has joined us, so are all together again as a complete unit.

— Hamilton, 4th Light Horse Field Ambulance

The Australian Mounted Division was relieved as supporting mounted division in the Abasan el Kebir area by the Yeomanry Mounted Division on 21 to 22 July 1917 before marching to Tel el Marakeb.

On 6 August Desert Column issued orders for the Yeomanry Mounted Division to relieve the Anzac Mounted Division as forward division, the Australian Mounted Division to relieve the Yeomanry Mounted Division in support, while the Anzac Mounted Division rode to Tel el Marakeb. These reliefs were to be carried out on 18 August. While the Anzac Mounted Division had been in the front line from 4 July to 18 August, the division had carried out 62 minor operations including reconnaissance patrols, ambushes, and raids on the railway line. During this time the New Zealand Mounted Rifle Brigade lost two men killed and 10 wounded from shelling and bombing.

Another of the many rotations of the three divisions took place on 18 September, when the Australian Mounted Division relieved the Yeomanry Mounted Division on the outpost line. The 7th Mounted Brigade took over from the 22nd Mounted Brigade at Gamli, the 4th Light Horse took over from the 6th Mounted Brigade at Tel el Fara, and the 3rd Light Horse took over from the 8th Mounted Brigade at Shellal. The 3rd Light Horse Brigade's night standing patrols, were in position by 18:00. The Anzac Mounted Division moved back to Abasan el Kebir from Tel el Marakeb, to take over as the reserve division on 18 September, and ten days later Allenby inspected the division.

==== Tel el Fara ====
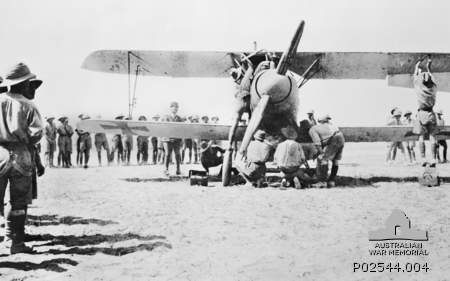
A captured German Albatross D5 aircraft at Tel el Fara

The Imperial Mounted Division had been at Beni Sela from 1 to 26 May, with forward headquarters at El Gamli from 7 May, before relieving the Anzac Mounted Division on 28 May. The 3rd Light Horse Brigade moved to Shellal with the rest of the Imperial Mounted Division to arrive 2 miles (3.2 km) west of Tel el Fara.

On 28 May, the 4th Light Horse Field Ambulance moved from Abasan el Kebir. As they arrived at Tel el Fara, a German Air Force Taube aircraft flew over very low to drop bombs, while the anti-aircraft guns shot at it. These single propeller, fighter-bombers flown by German pilots were effective and did a lot of damage in the Palestine region. "Taube is the German word for pigeon, but to us they are more like hawks then pigeons!"

Everyone digging funk holes all day, as ordered. Each man and his mate dig a two–man hole in the ground about four feet deep, in which to sleep or run to if the bombing is too close.

— Hamilton with 4th Light Horse Field Ambulance at Tel el Fara

The 10th Light Horse Regiment (3rd Light Horse Brigade) carried out Hotchkiss Rifle training at Shellal the following day, when the dust and flies were "very bad."

The routine at Tel el Fara was to sleep fully dressed so as to be ready to "stand to" in the dark at 03:30 until after dawn at 05:00 every morning, in case of a surprise attack and while the advanced patrol was out. Then back to sleep until 06:30.

Every officer & man including transport, cooks, batmen etc. will immediately saddle–up, nosebags will be filled and tied on saddle, men will put on equipment and be ready to move at a moments notice, ... vehicle drivers will harness horses but not inspan ... In [the] event of [an] attack in force ... [the brigade will] proceed to Bir el Esani.

— Orders for Standing To, 3 June 1917

Although short of horses in the lines, horses were taken to water in the Wadi Ghazza every morning while at Tel el Fara. "Stables" occurred three times a day when the horses were groomed and fed, the manure removed and buried "to keep down flies," and sick horses cared for.

==== Abasan el Kebir ====
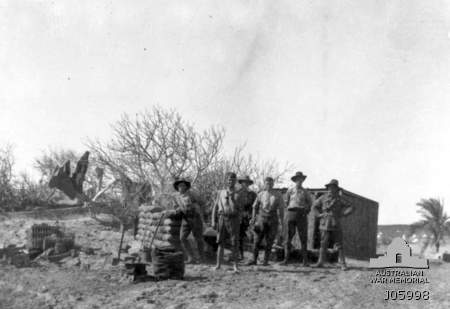
A squadron cookhouse of the 4th Australian Light Horse Regiment at Abbasan el Kebir in 1917

When the 3rd Light Horse Brigade returned from a strategic march to El Buqqar on 7 May, they moved to bivouac at Abasan el Kebir. Here khaki drill shorts were issued, and the horses were watered at troughs set up at the pipe head. The mounted divisions lived here in semi-permanent bivouacs constructed from light, wooden hurdles, covered with grass mats, erected over rectangular pits (funk holes) dug in the ground to give some protection from aerial bombing. The site of the 4th Light Horse Field Ambulance bivouac in May, which had "previously been occupied by a German machine gun company", was among almond trees and prickly pears. During May, the 1st Light Horse and the New Zealand Mounted Rifles Brigades (Anzac Mounted Division), along with the Imperial Mounted Division's headquarters, bivouacked near Abasan el Kebir, while the 2nd Light Horse and 22nd Mounted Brigades, with two batteries RHA and the Divisional Ammunition Column, bivouacked on the beach at Tel el Marakeb, to the west of Khan Yunis.

On 17 June, the "original" horses still with the Anzac Mounted Division, which had been shipped from Australia and New Zealand, and had crossed the Suez Canal with the division in April 1916 were:

- 671 horses in the 1st Light Horse Brigade
- 742 horses in the 2nd Light Horse Brigade
- 1056 horses in the New Zealand Mounted Rifles Brigade

The brigadiers of the division agreed that the ideal horse "should be from 15 to 15.3 and as near 15 hands as possible and should be stout and cobby and if possible with plenty of blood."

During the second half of September, while the Anzac Mounted Division was at Abasan el Kebir, 600 donkeys were attached to the division. The donkeys arrived at the railway station, and after the "bored-looking quadrupeds with their comical expressions and long floppy ears" were unloaded, they were tied together in fives for the journey. With one dismounted man in front, leading their four horses, another three dismounted men followed, shepherding the donkeys, which "travelled mostly in circles." Instead of moving along the road, the donkeys toured the countryside to eventually arrive at divisional headquarters, where they were assigned to a number of units. Seven donkeys were attached to each squadron to be ridden or led by 'spare parts.' A form of polo was played by the New Zealand Mounted Rifles Brigade riding donkeys, and swinging walking sticks at a football. In December when the advance had reached the Judean Hills, the donkeys carried supplies over rough tracks, up and down precipitous hills, to the front line troops.

While the divisions were in reserve at Abasan el Kebir, training was conducted in musketry, tactical schemes, staff rides, practice concentrations, anti–gas methods, the handling and sending of messages by carrier pigeons, and getting quickly ready to move out on operations. Other activities carried on while at Abasan el Kebir, included cricket matches and, on 31 August, a boxing competition. On 16 October, Allenby presented medals to officers and men of the Anzac Mounted Division at Abasan el Kebir.

==== Tel el Marakeb ====
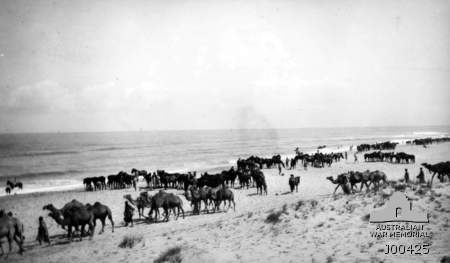
The 4th Light Horse Regiment, on the beach at Tel el Marakeb

At Tel el Marakeb, about 20 miles (32 km) south of Gaza on the Mediterranean coast, the men could swim in the Mediterranean Sea and be entertained at concert parties. At the end of July, the whole Australian Mounted Division surfed, played sports, sunbaked, and swam the horses every day, while at Tel el Marakeb. There were short foot races on the beach, obstacle races, mounted rescue races, and a mounted tug-of-war competition. "With twelve mounted men on each side, everything depends on the steadiness of the horses." (Note: See Hamilton 1996 p. 49 for a photograph of a mounted tug-of-war.) Extensive trials and practices took place before the three days of heats and finals. Here semi-permanent bivouacs were constructed from "iron standards ... phone wire ... [and] sheets of iron."

Chauvel inspected the 4th Light Horse Field Ambulance while they were at Tel el Marakeb in August. "The bearers, all smartly dressed, stood in line, with their saddle cloths spread out on the sand in front of them. On each saddle cloth, in similar positions, lay each man's full equipment of about 25 separate items, all cleaned and polished up to the nines—saddles, stirrups and irons, bridles and bits, water bottles, feed bags, greatcoats, saddle bags, dixies, etc. etc." On Friday 17 August, the Division moved back to El Fukhan. "Six men on leave to Port Said." The New Zealand Mounted Rifle Brigade arrived at Tel el Marakeb the next day for a fortnight on the beach before they returned to El Fukhari near Tel el Fara.

While at Tel el Marakeb, Captain Herrick, New Zealand Mounted Rifles Brigade, who was in charge of Hotchkiss gun training, redesigned the pack saddle for these guns so that one could be carried on the centre of the saddle instead of to one side. The brigade farriers reworked the pack saddles in the field, to Captain Herrick's design. The brigade was still in reserve at Tel el Marakeb, when on 13 September the brigade held a rifle competition.

== Ottoman Yildirim Army Group activated ==
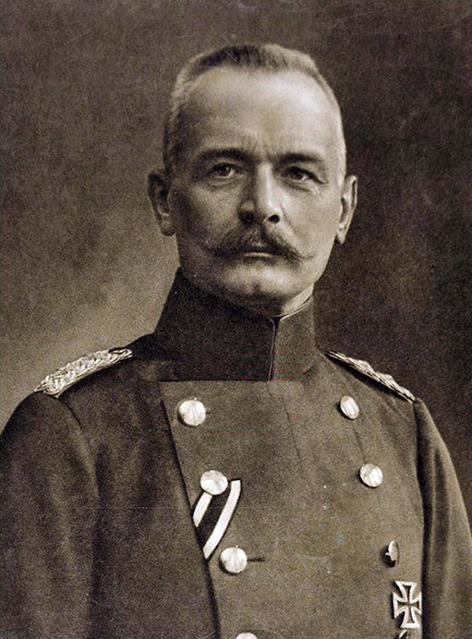
General Erich von Falkenhayn

Enver Pasha activated the Yildirim Army Group (also known as Thunderbolt Army Group), commanded by the German General Erich von Falkenhayn, in June 1917, and reinforced it with surplus Ottoman units transferred from Galicia, Romania, and Thrace.

By July, the Ottoman force defending the Gaza to Beersheba line had increased to 151,742 rifles, 354 machine guns, and 330 artillery guns. The Germans referred to the Yildirim Army Group as Army Group F, after its commander, von Falkenhayn, who took command at the end of July 1917 with 65 German and nine Ottoman staff officers, which effectively cut most Ottoman officers out of the decision-making process. Germany sent the 701st, 702nd, and 703rd Pasha Infantry Battalions, in the late summer and early autumn of 1917, to reinforce Yildirim Army Group, and they were later consolidated into "Asia Corps." (Note: Erickson notes Asia Corps was "never an army corps." [Erickson 2001 pp. 169, 232] Asia Corps would consist of the three infantry battalions, three machine gun detachments, and three cavalry detachments, an artillery battalion, a squadron of aircraft for artillery spotting, two heavy artillery sections, an infantry/artillery coordination section, communications, motor transport, and four air detachments of eight aircraft each. [Erickson 2001 p. 169])

Heavy Ottoman casualties were caused by British artillery bombardments. On 15 July, after "four months of strategic movement and a month of theatre–specific training," the Ottoman 7th Infantry Division, under the command of Colonel Kazim, conducted a counterattack at Yuksek Tepe.

== Arrival of Allenby ==
The new commander of the EEF, General Sir Edmund Allenby, was not the first choice. Jan Smuts, the South African general, was in London, having recently returning from the partly successful East African Campaign fought against the German Empire. He was Lloyd George's choice to succeed Murray, but Smuts declined because he thought the War Office would not fully support the Palestine campaign. Certainly there was some ambivalence regarding the Palestine campaign. The General Staff refused to transfer divisions from France because of the threat of more German attacks in that theatre, but neither the Prime Minister Lloyd George nor the War Cabinet wanted to abandon Palestine. They saw the theatre as the most likely place where the Ottoman Empire might be eliminated from the war. This would isolate the German Empire, and make British Empire forces, then serving in Mesopotamia and Palestine, available for transfer to France. Further, the unrestricted German submarine campaign attacking shipping particularly in the Mediterranean Sea, threatening supplies and dislocating the mails, (Note: After a khamsin, Duguid noted on 20 May, "It is in orders that another mail has been lost at sea. Letters written about the end of April. That is the second mail gone in the one month." [Duguid 1919 pp. 61–2]) was at its height at the time. The severe shortages suffered by the British population, and the continuing flood of British Expeditionary Force casualties from the Western Front, threatened to undermine British public morale. A victory in Palestine would give the Allies a successful "crusade" in the Holy Land, which would lift morale.

The War Cabinet then chose Allenby, the commander of the Third Army in France, who had just "won a striking victory at Arras." He had been commissioned into the 6th (Inniskilling) Dragoons in 1882 and had served in colonial Africa in the Bechuanaland (1884–5) and Zululand (1888) expeditions. By the time the South African war (1899–1902) began he was adjutant in the Third Cavalry Brigade, and at its end held the rank of major. Major Allenby first met Australians during the Second Boer War when he took command of a squadron of New South Wales Lancers outside Bloemfontein. Between 1910 and 1914 he was promoted to major general and appointed Inspector General of Cavalry. At the beginning of the First World War, Allenby commanded the 1st Cavalry Division from August to October 1914, when his division played a crucial role in the retreat after the Battle of Mons By the First Battle of Ypres, in October and November 1914, he had been promoted General in command of the Cavalry Corps. He commanded the V Corps of the Second Army at the Second Battle of Ypres, in 1915, and the Third Army at the Battle of Arras, in April 1917. Before he left London for Cairo, Lloyd George asked Allenby to capture Jerusalem, "as a Christmas present for the British nation." Allenby arrived in Egypt on 27 June and took command of the EEF at midnight on 28 June to begin his preparations for manoeuvre warfare.

== EEF operations, July to October ==
=== Trench warfare ===
The trench lines in the Gaza region were raided by both sides in July. On 20 July the 162nd Brigade (54th Division) attacked Umbrella Hill, southwest of Gaza, leaving 101 dead and capturing 17 prisoners, a trench mortar, and a machine gun. This raid was followed by a heavy Ottoman bombardment which caused over 100 casualties. On 28 July a similar operation resulted in the same outcome, while the air war became quiet.

=== Mounted operations ===
Constant patrolling during the "blazing heat of August," including numerous mounted reconnaissances by Allenby, Chauvel, and Chetwode, were described by General Ludendorff in his memoir: "At the end of August large masses of English cavalry advanced on Beersheba so as to work round the left flank of the Gaza front and reach the water supply of Jerusalem. This enterprise failed." These regular fortnightly mounted reconnaissances, "undoubtedly contributed to lull" the Ottoman high command into a false sense of security before "the real concentration took place."

==== Northeast towards Gaza-to-Beersheba road and Irgeig ====
During the night of 31 July/1 August, the 7th Light Horse Regiment (3rd Light Horse Brigade) carried out a reconnaissance patrol, when they reached the Gaza to Beersheba road. Here they attacked an Ottoman cavalry patrol, capturing one prisoner.

Following the capture of a strong Ottoman post near Irgeig towards the end of July, Ottoman cavalry made a demonstration in strength from Beersheba.

On 8 August, No. 7 Light Car Patrol "worked round the enemy to the south" and as the enemy began to retire, pursued them for some distance towards Irgeig, killing three men and two horses.

At 19:40 on the night of 13/14 August, the Anzac Mounted Division, with the 18th RHA Brigade, advanced between the gap in the Ottoman outposts between Beersheba and the main Ottoman line, to blow up a section of the railway near Irgeig. The forward divisional headquarters was opened at Karm at 21:30, with the artillery batteries, at Goz el Basal. The 6th and 7th Light Horse Regiments (3rd Light Horse Brigade) advanced on foot towards Irgeig, but were unable to reach the railway and had to turn back, so as not to be caught out in the open at dawn. A forward patrol, by the 7th Light Horse Regiment, advanced to within a few yards of the redoubt, where only one sentry was on lookout.

A second attempt by the 7th Light Horse Regiment to place a bomb on the railway line near Irgeig, was made during the night of 16/17 August. While the explosives were being put into position, the light horsemen were attacked by an Ottoman patrol, the noise of which alarmed all the Ottoman units in the area. The light horsemen were forced to retire before the charges could not be lit.

On 3 August the Auckland Mounted Rifles Regiment rode out to the Wadi Imleih, when forward patrols sent to Khirbit Erk came under heavy fire from an Ottoman post. Although this post was "dispersed by our Artillery fire," a hostile aircraft machine gunned the New Zealanders, while an Ottoman gun fired shells on the troops, until an EEF aircraft appeared. That night the 2nd Light Horse Brigade carried out operations to reach Kh. el Sufi without being opposed, before making a reconnaissance along the Ottoman railway line. During this operation they cut the telegraph line from Bir Saba on the Fara road, before eventually encountering an outpost line, drawing "a heavy burst of rifle fire." During the night of 6/7 August the 2nd Light Horse Regiment carried out another operation in the Wadi Imleih.

Mounted reconnaissances were carried out in August, to Khirbit Erk, Bir Ifteis, and the junction of wadis Hanafish and Imleih, as well as towards the Wadi Inalaga. Communications were maintained by wireless which worked very well.

==== Southeast to Ras Ghannam, Ruweihi and south of Beersheba ====
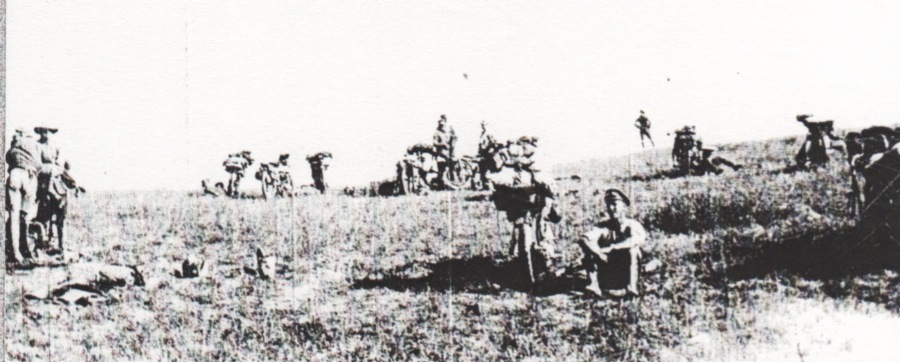
Motor cycle dispatch riders of the Australian Mounted Division Signal Squadron during a reconnaissance towards Beersheba in July 1917

On Wednesday 4 July, a reconnaissance of the country and defences in the Shellal, Beersheba, and Asluj areas was carried out. During this reconnaissance a survey by Eastern Force was carried out, covered by the Australian Mounted Division with the 1st Light Horse Brigade attached. During this operation the Australian Mounted Division established a forward headquarters at 06:15, at the junction of the Abu Shawich to Khalasa and the Fara to Beersheba roads, to the east of El Buqqar, while the three light horse and one mounted brigades were deployed to hold various lines in the area. A reconnaissance was also made by Chauvel and the "army commander" in the direction of Bir Saba/Beersheba, covered by the Australian Mounted Division.

As a result of a report that part of the line that held Ottoman defenders in front of Beersheba had been evacuated, on 23 July the New Zealand Mounted Rifles Brigade supported by artillery, reconnoitred the Beersheba defences. They were found to be fully occupied. A month later, Chauvel reconnoitred to the south and west of Beersheba, on 24 August.

Reconnaissances were carried out towards Bir ibn Turkia, G. el Na'am, G. Itwail el Semin, Ras Ghannam and Ruweihi on 13 August, when 25 Bedouin were captured. During the day Ottoman batteries fired fifty-three 77 mm shells, killing one soldier and two Bedouin women and wounding three soldiers.

On 2 October a reconnaissance was conducted by the Australian Mounted Division, during which the 4th Light Horse Brigade established a front line, the Australian Mounted Division forward headquarters was established at Rashid Bek with the 7th Mounted Brigade in reserve, and the 3rd Light Horse Brigade took up a line through Goz Sheihili. During this reconnaissance, Allenby conducted a personal reconnaissance to about 6 miles (9.7 km) south of Beersheba, covered by the division. A reconnaissance of the Wadi Sufi from Kh. el Sufi by the 4th Light Horse Brigade scouts was also carried out, during which the scouts were opposed by 200 rifles, three machine guns and two small calibre shrapnel guns from a range of 900 yards (820 m). During this reconnaissance a sergeant and his party of four were heavily shelled while measuring wells and cisterns, and locating Ottoman day posts and watering places. (Note: Sergeant Bill Cruickshank was awarded a Distinguished Conduct Medal. [Massey 2007 p. 39])

On 18 October officers and senior NCOs of the Australian Mounted Divisional Train accompanied a reconnaissance towards Beersheba, during which watering places were inspected, and refilling points selected.

==== South to Esani, Rashid Bek, Tel Itweil, on the track to Khalasa and Asluj ====
During the night of 31 July/1 August, the 2nd Light Horse Regiment (1st Light Horse Brigade) rode to Bir el Esani and Rashid Bek, to find the water at Esani "rapidly diminishing." The Wellington Mounted Rifles Regiment (New Zealand Mounted Rifles Brigade) made a reconnaissance to the Wadi Imleih, when four high explosive shells were fired from the direction of Hareira, killing two horses.

On 5 and 6 August, water reconnaissances by the New Zealand Field Troop reported Esani had water for at least two Divisions. The Railway Construction Engineers made a survey of the northern section of the line, approaching Beersheba from Hafir el Auja, protected by New Zealand troops.

The Yeomanry Mounted Division reconnoitred the country near Goz Lakhkeilat Ridge, on 22 August. While the Yeomanry Mounted Division conducted at reconnaissance to the Khalasa area on 2 September, the 4th Light Horse Brigade moved forward to El Gamli in support.

A 48-hour reconnaissance from Tel el Fara, was carried out from 23 to 25 September, when the roads and water in the Esani and Khalasa areas were surveyed. While the survey was conducted, the 3rd and 4th Light Horse Brigades, with the 7th Mounted Brigade in reserve at Rashid Bek, established a line through Ibn Saiid to Goz el Geleib, 4 miles (6.4 km) southeast of Khalasa, at 10:30, without meeting any opposition. They withdrew at 16:30 after completion of the reconnaissance.

On 26 September, the 12th Light Horse Regiment covered a special reconnaissance, by Desert Mounted Corps Staff, in the area of Tel Itweil, Esani, and Khalasa, taking up a line from Point 720 to Rashid Bek at 09:25 without being opposed. They withdrew without incident when the reconnaissance was complete an hour and a half later.

Orders were received by the Australian Mounted Division, on 16 October, to cover a reconnaissance on 18 October by the XX Corps, when the 7th Mounted Brigade held a line east of Khalasa and Ibn Saiid, with the 4th Light Horse and 5th Mounted Brigades also taking up forward lines, without opposition. During the reconnaissance, Ottoman soldiers were observed in a redoubt near Irgeig, and one troop of Ottoman cavalry was seen in the Wadi Imleih. Notts Battery shelled the railway at Irgeig, troops and two bell tents at Irgeig station, and a small redoubt 3,000 yards (2,700 m) away. They also fired high explosive shells on trenches at Point 630. It was noted that the enemy was more quiet during this reconnaissance than any previously.

On 15 October, 50 Ottoman cavalrymen were observed at Rashid Bek. A party moved out against Point 630 while two armoured cars drove round to the rear of the hill, firing on 12 Ottoman horsemen, at 300 yards (270 m) range, retiring from Imleih; but the cars were shelled by Ottoman artillery and withdrew.

==== East to Kasif and El Buqqar on the Tel el Fara-to-Beersheba track ====
===== EEF ambush at Khasif =====
During the last three days of June, about 100 Ottoman soldiers advanced to occupy an area 2,000 yards (1,800 m) east of Karm, and an ambush was planned by the 4th Light Horse Regiment (4th Light Horse Brigade) for 1 July. While two dismounted troops with eight Hotchkiss guns advanced from Karm to a stone building in the Khasif ruins, a dismounted troop held Karm. The remaining two troops, with led horses, took cover behind Goz el Basal, further back towards Tel el Fara. The troops holding the stone building made a surprise attack on a half-squadron of Ottoman cavalry riding in "column of sections," killing eight men and three horses. Another man who was seriously wounded died later died, while 25 other wounded who remained mounted, escaped. A large Ottoman force subsequently advanced to threaten the light horsemen, but when two squadrons of light horse advanced, the Ottomans withdrew.

For this operation Sergeant J. Gillespie was awarded the Military Medal: "[T]his NCO had charge of three sections and brought fire to bear on 2 troops of Turkish cavalry, which were enfilading parts of another squadron, causing the enemy to retire. During the whole action he set a fine example to his men." Squadron Sergeant Major R. S. Hampton was also awarded a Military Medal: "[H]e rendered valuable assistance in the ambushing of enemy. He set a fine example and was responsible for direction of fire of his party." Trooper H. C. Robertson was recommended for the Distinguished Conduct Medal, but was awarded the Military Medal: "He was in charge of directed fire of a Hotchkiss gun and accounted for considerable casualties among the enemy." Major G. J. Rankin, was mentioned in AIF In Egypt Order No. 10 of 16 August 1917 by Chauvel: "the [Desert] Column commander wishes to place on record his appreciation of the excellent work carried out by a squadron of the 4th LHR under Major Rankin ... when half a squadron of Turkish cavalry was skilfully ambushed and severely handled."

===== El Buqqar on 19, 20 July =====
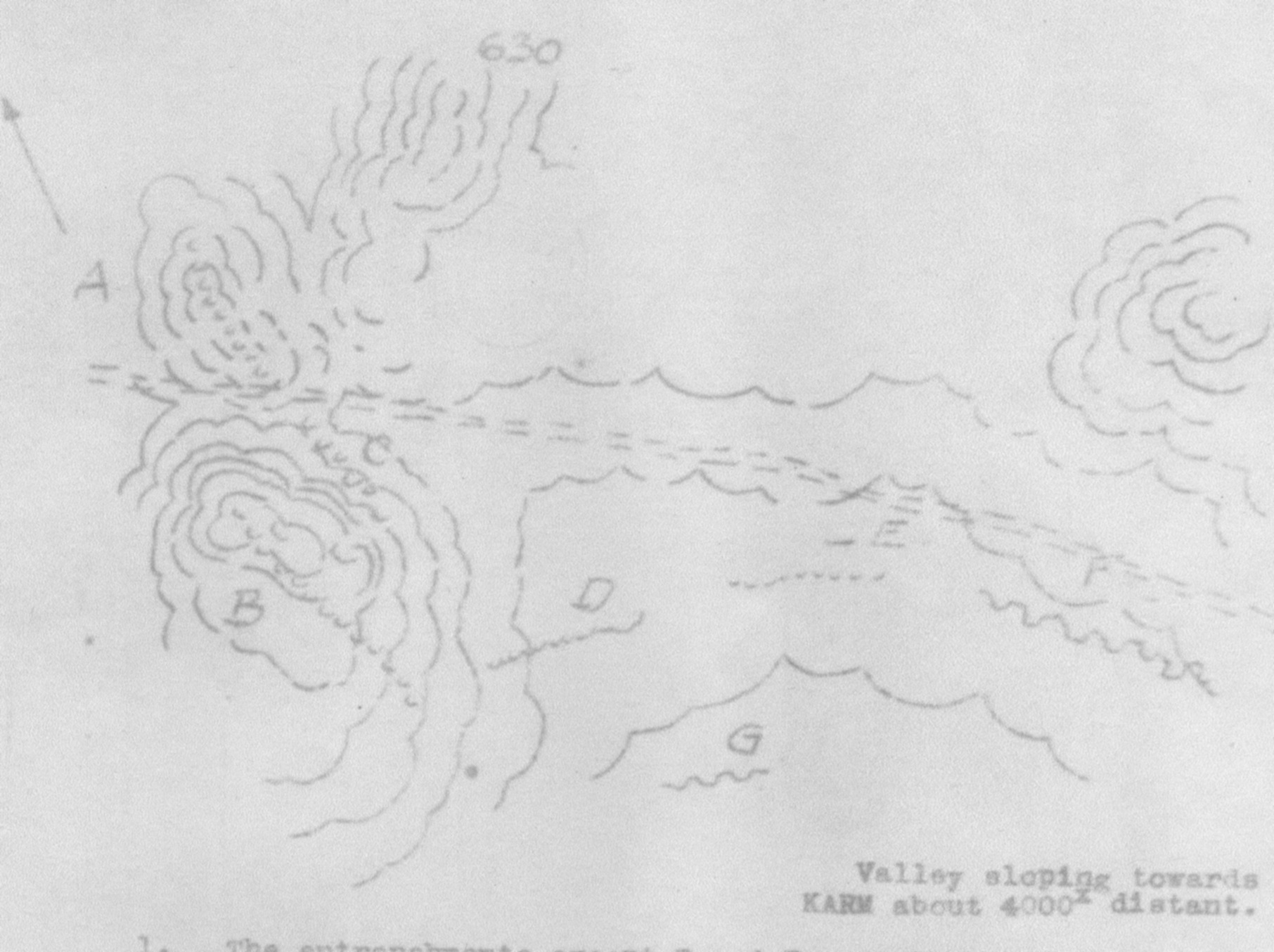
Sketch map of Ottoman defences on 19 July 1917

Desert Column received a report from Anzac Mounted Division, at 06:50 on 19 July, that Ottoman artillery shells were being fired on the railhead of the railway to Karm, at Goz Geleib. (Note: In mid-September the railway line to Karm was under construction. [Cutlack 1941 p. 75]) The day patrols went out but mist obscured the situation, and a report at 08:20 described Ottoman force occupying El Buqqar, with four light guns near Im Siri. The 2nd Light Horse Brigade was ordered to "clear up the situation towards Im Siri," and the 1st Light Horse Brigade was ordered forward, while the New Zealand Mounted Rifles Brigade stood ready to move. It was confirmed, at 10:10, that about two regiments of Ottoman cavalry and some infantry held the El Girheir to Khasif to El Buqqar line, covered by guns at Imleih, which were in action. The Anzac Mounted Division headquarters, and the New Zealanders in reserve, moved forward to Gos el Basal, and at 10:15 the Australian Mounted Division in the Abasan el Kebir area was ordered forward. By 11:00 the Yeomanry Mounted Division at Tel el Marakeb and the Imperial Camel Corps Brigade had also been ordered to be ready to move at short notice.

Aerial reconnaissance by the EEF reported, at 11:30, one Ottoman brigade holding a position stretching from the north of Um Siri to the south of El Buqqar, another force of about two regiments at Harari, and a third regiment at the well near Sufi. Meanwhile, Ottoman artillery was continuing to cover their line, firing at targets to the east of Karm. Elsewhere, the 1st Light Horse Brigade at Goz Lakhleilat was in touch with the right of the 2nd Light Horse Brigade. At 14:20 the Australian Mounted Division at El Melek, was ordered to advance and turn the Ottoman force's left flank, while the Anzac Mounted Division continued to face the Ottoman force holding their line. By 17:30 the Ottoman force had moved back towards Beersheba, and was still holding a very strong position near Taweil el Habari, about a third of the way between Buqqar and Beersheba on the Tel el Fara to Beersheba track, when the Yeomanry Mounted Division (with the 5th Mounted Brigade attached) was ordered to bivouac near Fukhari. The Imperial Camel Corps Brigade moved to near El Garbi, and the 53rd (Welsh) Division was ordered to move a reserve infantry brigade at El Sha'uth, to take up a position stretching from Jezariye to Um Ajua to El Rueibia.

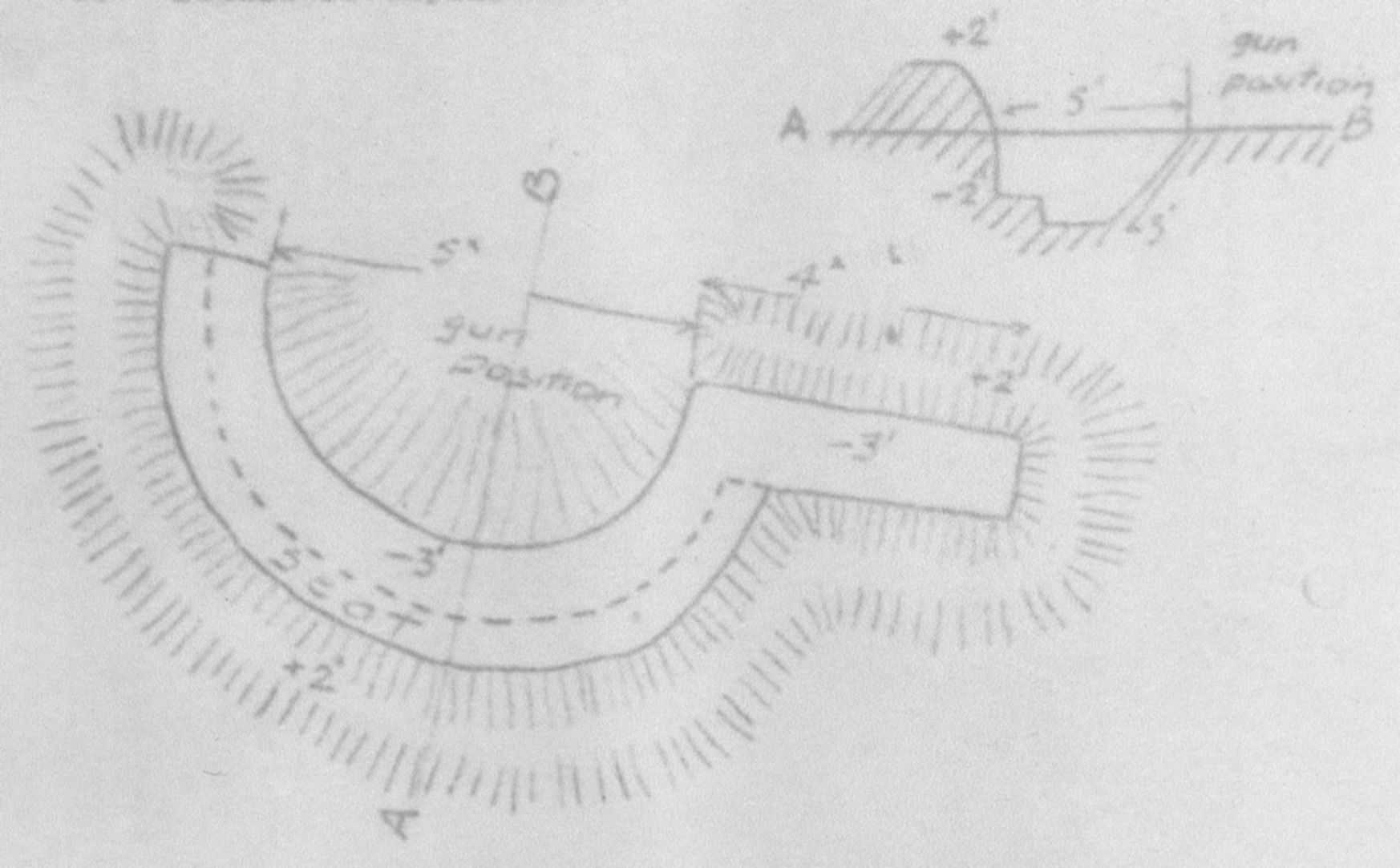
Sketch of Ottoman gun emplacement facing west

When the Australian Mounted Division arrived at Goz Lakhleilat on the left flank, the Ottoman cavalry had withdrawn behind entrenchments, defended by Ottoman infantry. These trenches, including gun emplacements, stretched from Girheir to eventually join the Bir Saba/Beersheba defences. The Australian Mounted Division subsequently withdrew to Gamli for the night, leaving one brigade at Esani. The Anzac Mounted Division was ordered to withdraw to Tel el Fara at 20:00. During the night of 19/20 July, the Anzac Mounted Division was ordered to outflank and capture an Ottoman force reported advancing towards Shellal. After riding about 5 miles (8.0 km), the 1st and 2nd Light Horse Brigades, supported by the New Zealand Mounted Rifles Brigade in reserve, encountered the hostile force. After an artillery duel, the Ottoman force withdrew.

The following morning, 20 July, the Anzac and Australian Mounted Divisions moved out at 04:00, through Khasif to push the Ottoman cavalry back, but by 08:00 there was no sign of abnormal movements by any Ottoman forces. A prisoner identified the Ottoman units as part of the 16th Division, which had recently arrived at Sheria. He claimed the activity had been because a new corps commander had carried out a personal reconnaissance. Other Ottoman prisoners, captured during the operation, were from the 6th and 8th Cavalry Regiments. During these activities an aerial bombing attack on the New Zealand Mounted Rifles Brigade killed two and wounded five, also killing 14 horses and wounding 11, while the Anzac Mounted division suffered three soldiers killed and 12 wounded. All EEF units were ordered, at 22:00, to return to their normal positions on 21 July, when the area that had been held by the Ottoman force was found to have returned to normal. (Note: See also sketch map of the Ottoman trenches and a sketch of the gun emplacement following Desert Column War Diary AWM4-1-64-7 July 1917 Appendix 6 pp. 3–4)

===== Khasif, El Buqqar area =====
On 9 August, the 5th Light Horse Brigade [sic] (Note: This could be the 5th Light Horse Regiment or the 5th Mounted Brigade. The 5th Light Horse Brigade was formed in mid 1918, being fully established in August 1918. [Bou 2009 pp. 189–90]) rode out towards El Buqqar and Khasif where they dispersed Ottoman patrols.

On 21 September, Ottoman cavalry that occupied Points 720 and 620 were driven off by six troops of the Australian Mounted Division with one subsection of a machine gun squadron. The next morning, stubborn resistance was offered to the division's patrol, which eventually pushed 20 Ottoman soldiers off Point 630.

On 27 and 28 September the stalemate quietly continued; however, on 29 September, Ottoman troops that were occupying Points 550, 630 and 720, at 08:00, were eventually driven out of their positions by the Australian Mounted Division's day patrols, reinforced by two troops and machine guns.

A patrol to Khasif reported, at 08:00 on 1 October, that a squadron of Ottoman cavalry was holding an observation post 2 miles (3.2 km) east of El Buqqar, on the Tel el Fara to Bir Saba/Beersheba road, while EEF units holding Abu Shawish were shelled throughout the day by Ottoman artillery.

Orders were issued, on 8 October, for the 5th Mounted Brigade to take over duties of outpost brigade the next day. On 9 October, a minor operation was carried out by the 11th Light Horse Regiment and one squadron of the 12th Light Horse Regiment with A Battery, Honourable Artillery Company, when Ottoman garrisons on Point 630 and Point 720 were fired on by the battery, before the light horsemen occupied the two places. On 11 October, Ottoman cavalry patrols were encountered east of El Buqqar, "dressed in dark clothes and riding horses of similar stamp to our own."

A patrol to Point 630 on 12 October was fired on by about 45 Ottoman soldiers with machine guns, before the Australian Mounted Division's machine guns engaged them for about half an hour, eventually forcing them back. At 13:30 the next day a patrol to El Buqqar was fired on by 30 Ottoman soldiers 1 mile (1.6 km) northeast of that place, while a reconnaissance by the General Staff of Anzac Mounted Division to Esani, was underway. On 14 October, one NCO and two men were captured by Ottoman cavalry at Point 720, when they attempted to capture a Bedouin who had fired on them. Two troops of Ottoman cavalry, armed with lances, swords, and rifles, wearing blue and white tunics and riding Arab ponies, galloped quickly to cut off and capture the three Australian Mounted Division soldiers. A troop sent forward recaptured Point 720, but the Ottoman cavalry were seen in the distance, retiring to the east.

Following the observation of 50 Ottoman cavalry at Rashid Bek during 15 October, an ambush was organised for the night of 15/16 October, by two squadrons of Gloucester Yeomanry and one section of Machine Gun Squadron, to occupy the ruined house on Point 720. One officer and 20 men were left on Point 720, and the same force occupied two huts at Beit Abu Taha. However, the Ottoman cavalry remained in the distance until 07:50 the following morning, when the usual patrols returned to Points 630 and 720. As they approached, they were shot at, at close range, when one man and two horses were killed, and another man was seriously wounded. The remainder of the patrol returned at the gallop, when one horse was shot, the rider walking back under cover of a Hotchkiss barrage. During this exchange one Ottoman soldier was killed and two captured, while three of their horses were killed. At 09:00 two armoured cars reconnoitred the El Buqqar ridge finding it clear of the enemy. Two troops occupying Point 630 were forced to withdraw after being shelled by Ottoman artillery and fired on by machine guns from the ruins at Kh. Imleih.

During 19 October, Ottoman posts were seen on Point 630, El Girheir, Point 720 and Point 820.

==== Buqqar attack on 23 ====
On 23 October, when a squadron of the Gloucester Yeomanry (5th Mounted Brigade) advanced to occupy the line El Buqqar, Point 720 to Kh. Imleih to Point 630 at 05:00, they encountered a squadron of the enemy holding El Buqqar, with a second squadron with machine guns on Point 720 in support. Between 05:30 and 06:00, six motor cars containing eight occupants were seen on Point 720; the cars retired as the attacking Yeomanry appeared. The Ottoman soldiers occupying El Buqqar retired when they were outflanked and fired on by machine guns. By 07:00 the Ottoman soldiers occupying Point 720 and rifle pits were driven off, by a "well executed" converging attack by two yeomanry squadrons of Gloucester and Warwick Yeomanry, with one section of RHA. The yeomanry occupied Point 630, just before a squadron of Ottoman attacked, which was driven back from close quarters by rifle and Hotchkiss gun fire. At the same time when one Yeomanry troop occupied Imleih ridge, they were attacked by three Ottoman troops from the Wadi Hanafish. This attack was also repelled by yeomanry rifle and Hotchkiss fire. Both these Ottoman attacks went forward under cover of high explosive and shrapnel fire, from the direction of Irgeig, and behind Bir Ifteis. Two more squadrons, riding southeast towards Khor el Asram, were charged from the flank by three Ottoman troops, but under cover of bad light retired on supporting squadrons. One man was captured when his horse fell. A patrol by the 2nd Light Horse Brigade from Khor el Asram was fired on by enemy occupying a ridge 8 miles (13 km) north of Point 680. During these operations Ottoman forces continued holding Point 820 to Bir Ifteis, while the left sector of the Australian Mounted Division's line remained quiet.

==== 23/4 October permanent outpost line ====
By late October 1917, the EEF outpost line had been pushed forward to a line of low hills/ridge overlooking the Wadi Hanafish. This permanent outpost line was to be established from 17:00 on 24 October, and held day and night to cover the construction of the railway to Karm as it approached Imara. This permanent line was to prevent Ottoman field artillery firing on the railway construction crews, and it stretched from El Buqqar through Points 720 and 630 to Point 550. Attack on the line was most likely to occur about dawn, when the El Buqqar line was to form a pivot. If such an attack was successful the Ottoman force was to be "driven off" by an immediate counter-attack, and if the counter-attack was unsuccessful, then all available units were to contribute to a "deliberate and carefully arranged attack" by mounted units, supported by infantry and artillery from El Imara and Esani.

==== Buqqar Ridge attack on 27 October ====
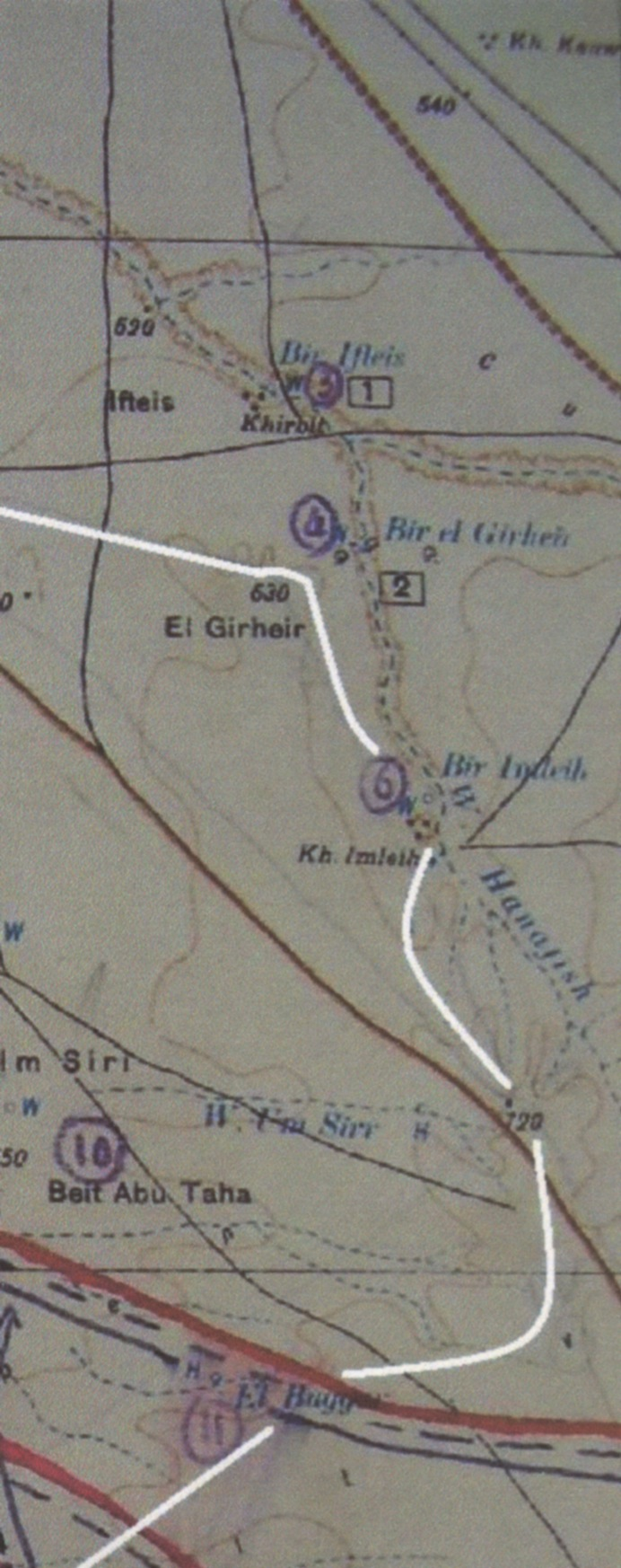
Detail of the el Girheir (Point 630) to El Buqqar defensive line including Point 720

General Erich von Falkenhayn, the Commander of the Yildirim Army Group, planned a two phase attack, beginning with a reconnaissance in force from Beersheba, for 27 October. This was to be followed by an attack, on the morning of 31 October 1917, by the Eighth Army from Hareira.

The reconnaissance in force was made by 3,000 Ottoman infantry, 1,200 cavalry, and twelve guns, which advanced from the Kauwukah defences in front of Tel esh Sheria, to attack the EEF outpost line. The headquarters of the Ottoman force defending the Gaza-Beersheba line was located at Sheria till June. In July it moved to Huj. (Note: British aerial bombing forced the move to Huj. [Cutlack 1941 p. 57]) They were the 125th Infantry Regiment (16th Division) from Tel esh Sheria and troops of the 3rd Cavalry Division from Beersheba, commanded by Ismet Bey, and including an infantry regiment from the 27th Division, and the 125th Field Artillery Battery.

The Ottoman attackers met "stubborn defence" by the Middlesex Yeomanry. Yeomanry troops and squadrons, from the 8th Mounted Brigade defending the line, were attacked in the early morning. While the defenders on Point 630 at El Girheir were able to maintain their position until reinforced by an infantry battalion in the afternoon, the yeomanry defending Point 720 were over-run by Ottoman cavalry, killing 14 troopers during the late morning, before they could be reinforced by units of the 3rd Light Horse Brigade and the 53rd (Welsh) Division.

=== Aerial attacks ===
A Taube (or 'Doves' almost certainly Fokkers) was being shrapnelled and shells burst apparently close to it, a snake–like vaporous spiral descending from each towards the earth. Suddenly hell opened beneath our feet, out of the peaceful palm grove came shot and shell – not in our direction, and our troops responded with terrible effect.

— Joseph W. McPherson, Egyptian Camel Transport Corps

On 5 August, a German aircraft landed in the desert near Bir el Abd, when an attempt was made to blow up the EEF's main line of communication, the Sinai Peninsula railway line. The attempt was discovered and stopped by guards. On the same day, an attempt to damage the water pipeline near Salmana was made when a German aircraft landed nearby. A couple of lengths of pipe were blown up, before a patrol stopped the attack, and forced the aircraft to leave.

At the end of August, after a hostile aircraft bombed a yeomanry camp, No.1 Squadron retaliated with an air raid on Hareira.

As the end of the stalemate approached, A. B. Paterson, Officer Commanding Remounts, describes an incident demonstrating the huge risks pilots faced:

We are very near the climax now. I am taking a hundred horses up by road as there is not room for them on the trains; and ahead of me and behind me there are similar consignments of horses all headed for the front. I pass a flying depot where the boys are leaving at daylight, each with his load of bombs to smash up the Turks. Eight of them start off, but one boy's machine fails to make altitude and he comes back for adjustments. As he lands, he rushes over to us and says: 'Come on, let us have a drink. I want a drink badly.' I say that it seems to me a bit early to have a drink. 'When a man has just landed a machine," he says, "with a dozen perfectly good live bombs under it, believe me, he wants a drink.' So we go and have a drink, and I speculate on what might have happened if he had landed the machine roughly and started those bombs off. These flying boys are being tested, and they are coming through it in great shape.

— A. B. (Banjo) Paterson, Officer Commanding Remounts

=== Dog fights continue ===
On 8 July, a reconnaissance by B.E.2.e aircraft, escorted by a Martinsyde and a B.E.12.a, were attacked near Gaza by two German scouts. While the B.E.2.e was able to return to base, the pilot of the Martinsyde was killed in a crash, while the B.E.12.a was forced to land and the pilot taken prisoner. On 13 July, two B.E.2.e aircraft took off for a photography patrol, but their escort failed to meet them over Esani. Subsequently one aircraft was shot down, killing the pilot and observer, while the other aircraft landed safely back behind EEF lines. On 16 July, a German scout withdrew rather than attack an escort. The next day an artillery observation aircraft was attacked by a German scout, but after an Australian aircraft fired a full drum from its Lewis gun, it withdrew.

On 3 August, a reconnaissance by aircraft from No. 1 Squadron reported a hostile aircraft on the ground, near Beersheba. Four EEF aircraft, sent to bomb it the next morning, were guarded by two more aircraft, in case of a surprise attack. As the bombers approached they saw the hostile was a dummy aircraft, so quickly started to climb just as two German scouts flew down from the sun, to attack. The Australian escort aircraft also attacked, and the Germans flew off not long after. On 1 September, two Martinsyde aircraft, reconnoitring over Beersheba, attacked a German scout, which later crashed.

The expansion of the air force led to EEF aircraft dominating the air war, which became quieter when photography patrols were able to cover larger areas around Beersheba. Newly arrived Bristol Fighters, of No. 111 Squadron, demonstrated their increased power, beginning on 8 October, when several were sent out to wait for the usual two Albatros scouts, which conducted German reconnaissances. One of the scouts was caught by the new, quicker British aircraft, and was shot and forced to land. On 15 October, three more Albatroses were fired on by British anti–aircraft guns, followed by an attack by a Bristol Fighter, which shot down one of the Albatros scouts.

== Seventh and Eighth Ottoman Armies activated ==
Within Yildirim Army group, while the Fourth Army headquarters and units in Syria commanded by Djemal Pasha continued to operate, the Ottoman forces in Palestine were reorganised into two armies. The Fourth Army headquarters in Palestine commanded by Kress von Kressenstein, was inactivated on 26 September 1917, and six days later, reactivated as the new Ottoman Eighth Army headquarters, still commanded by Kress von Kressenstein and still with responsibility for the Palestine front. The Seventh Army was commanded by Fevzi Pasha after the resignation of Mustafa Kemal. Although these were significant organisational changes, unlike the reorganisation of the EEF, they did not change the tactical deployments of the Ottoman III, XX, and XXII Corps, defending the Gaza to Beersheba line. (Note: It has been claimed, Yildirim Army Group would arrive "too late to conduct offensive operations but just in the nick of time to prevent a major disaster [when] the Yildirim infantry and cavalry divisions provided just enough reserve forces to provide the thinnest of margins necessary for a competent defense." [Erickson 2001 p. 160])

== End of stalemate ==
After making preparatory advances to get the EEF's three corps into position, the Southern Palestine Offensive began on 31 October, with the EEF victory at the Battle of Beersheba.

== See also ==
- Sinai and Palestine Campaign
- "Daredevils of the Desert," Young Indiana Jones movie about Stalemate.
