= June 1917 =

Month in 1917

<<	June 1917					>>
Su	Mo	Tu	We	Th	Fr	Sa
					1	2
3	4	5	6	7	8	9
10	11	12	13	14	15	16
17	18	19	20	21	22	23
24	25	26	27	28	29	30

The following events occurred in June 1917:

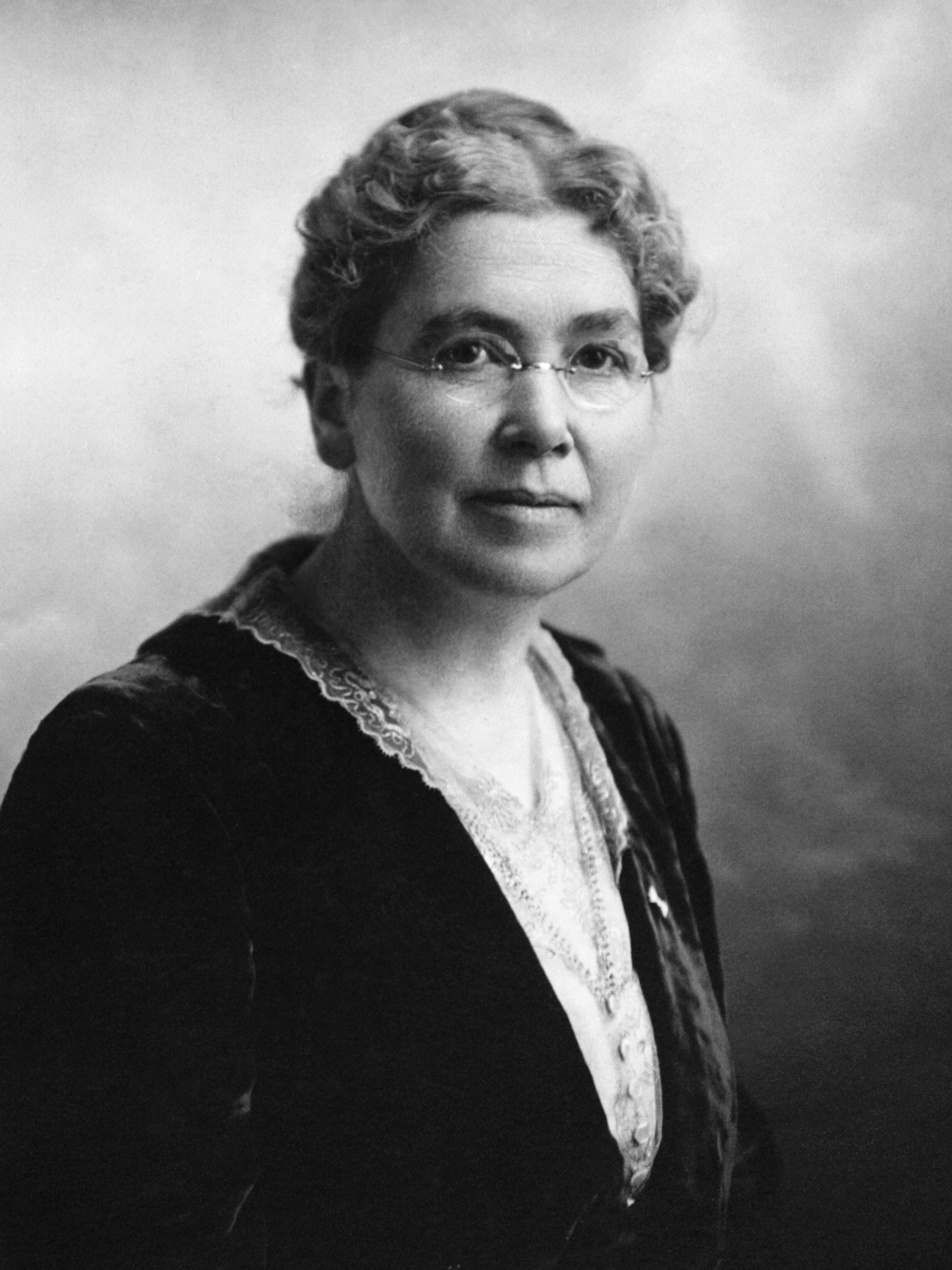
Louise McKinney, first of two women elected to office in Canada.

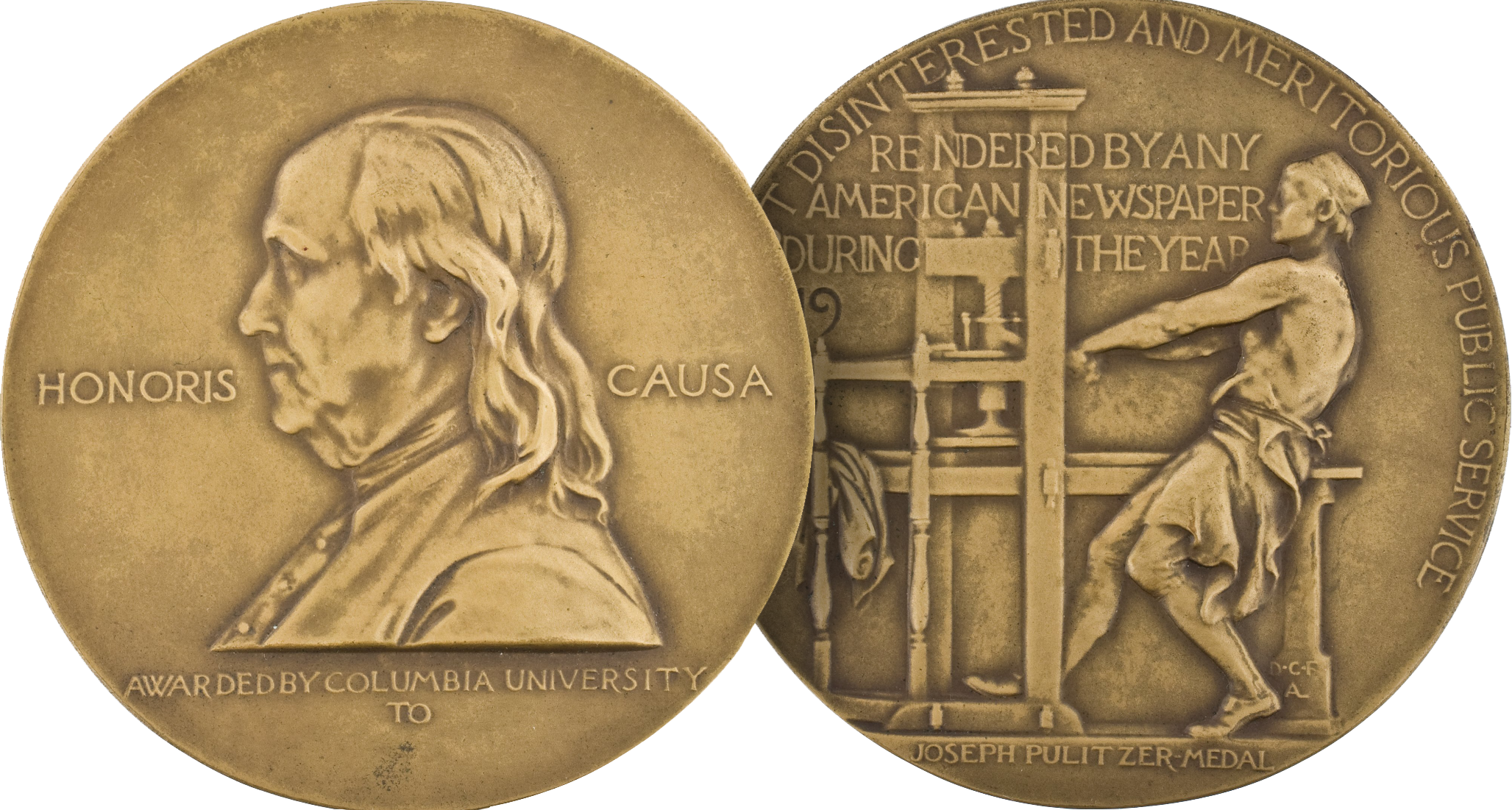
The first Pulitzer Prizes were awarded.

First Pulitzer Prize winners
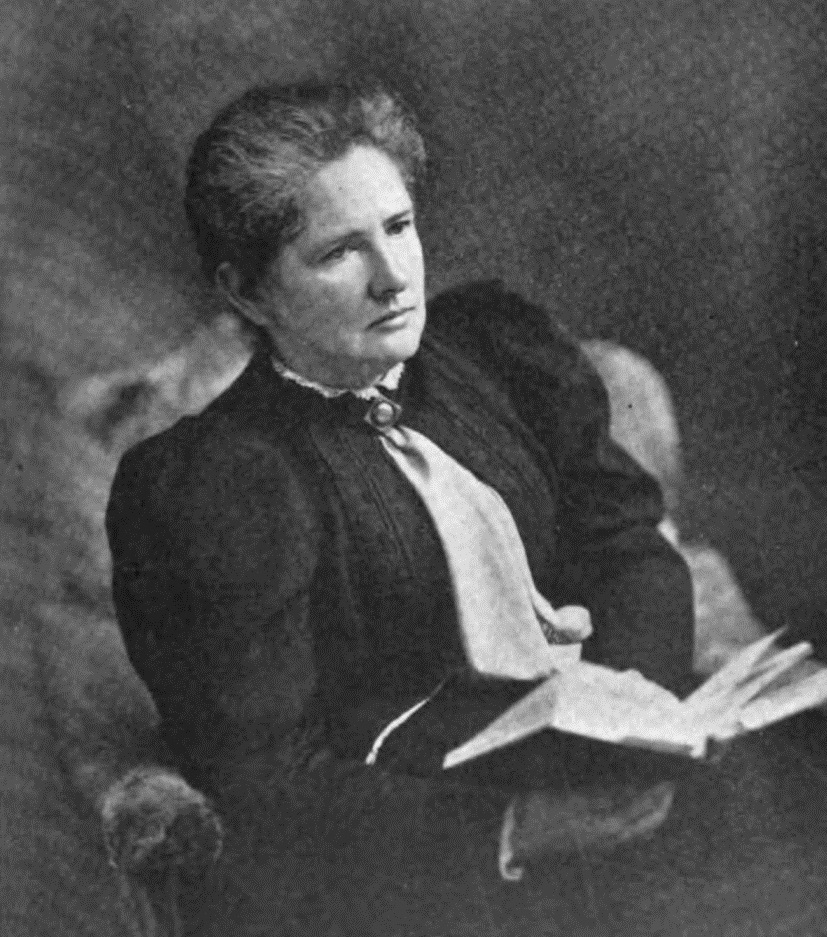
Laura E. Richards

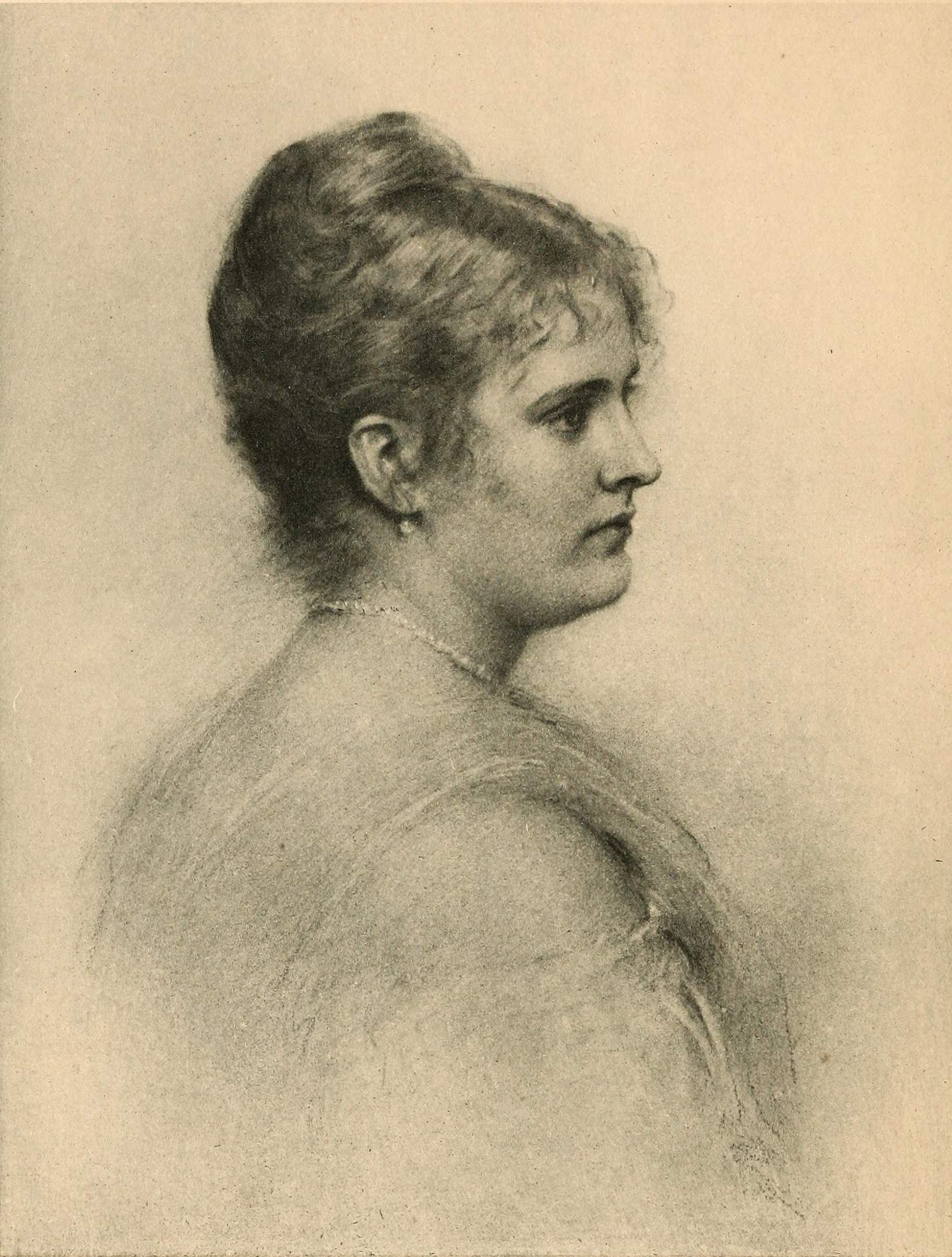
Maud Howe Elliott

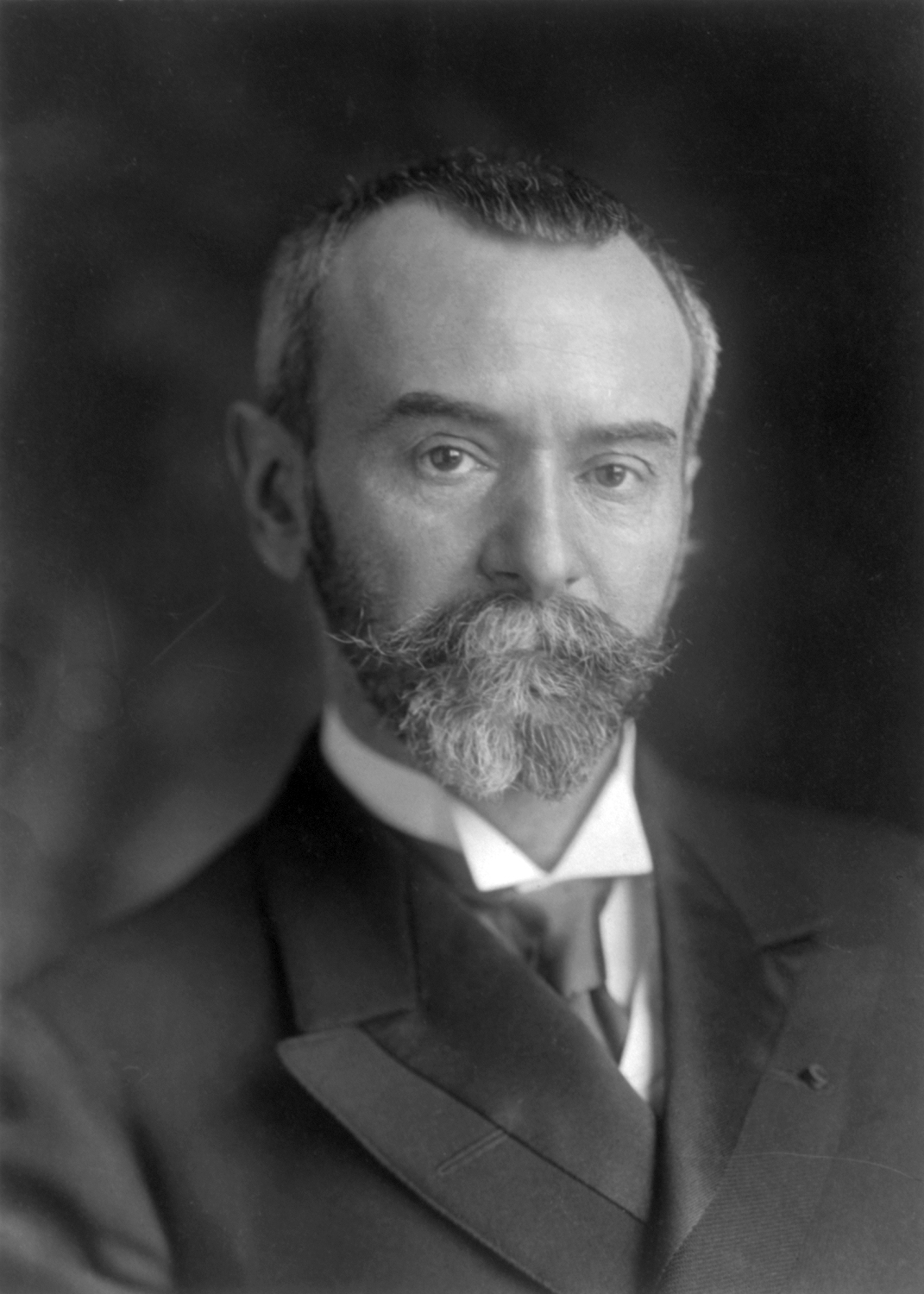
Jean Jules Jusserand

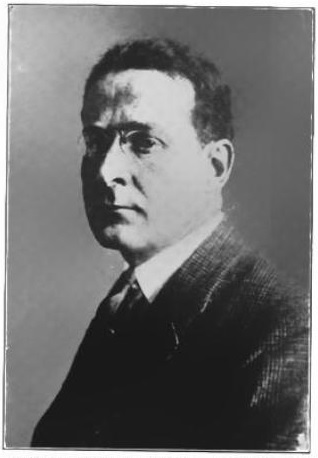
Herbert Bayard Swope

== June 1, 1917 (Friday) ==
- French Army Mutinies – A French infantry regiment seized Missy-aux-Bois, France, and declared an antiwar military government.
- Tornadoes in Kentucky, Oklahoma, and Kansas killed a total 22 people.
- The United States Army established 1st Battalion of the 21st Field Artillery Regiment at Camp Wilson, Texas.
- Hilda Nilsson, a housewife in Helsingborg, Sweden, was brought to trial on eight murder charges, all involving children of infant age that were conceived illegitimately and so brought into her care as a foster mother. During the trial, evidence was presented that Nilsson drowned eight of the children for financial reasons and then burned the bodies.
- U.S. Navy armored cruiser Huntington lofted a kite balloon, the first American naval ship to do so, while stationed for training drills at the Naval Air Station Pensacola in Pensacola, Florida.
- The United States Army established Camp Dix, an army training camp, near Wrightstown, New Jersey. The camp became permanent and was renamed Fort Dix in 1939.
- The Royal Flying Corps established air squadrons No. 198 and No. 199.
- The Blast magazine released what turned out to be its final issue. In a column, publisher and editor Alexander Berkman argued that conscription in the United States was an "abdication" of citizens' rights and called for persons who consider themselves conscientious observers to neither register nor be conscripted.
- Former Wright Company engineer Chance M. Vought co-founded with Birdseye Lewis the Lewis & Chance Corporation, the first incarnation of the series of Vought aviation firms to manufacture aircraft specific for aircraft carriers.
- The National Hockey Association forced a motion commanding ice hockey club owner Eddie Livingstone to sell the Toronto Blueshirts.
- The Montfort School was established in Yercaud, India by the Montfort Brothers of St. Gabriel as a secondary school for boy and girls.
- The patriotic war song "Over There" by American songwriter George M. Cohan was registered with the Library of Congress by publisher William Jerome. It would become the most popular song during the war with over two million copies sold.
- Born: William Standish Knowles, American chemist, recipient of the Nobel Prize in Chemistry for his research into enantioselective synthesis; in Taunton, Massachusetts, United States (d. 2012)

== June 2, 1917 (Saturday) ==
- New York City Subway stations for the IRT Jerome Avenue Line, including Burnside Avenue, Fordham Road, Kingsbridge Road, Mount Eden Avenue, Grand Concourse, 161st Street, 167th Street, 170th Street, 176th Street, and 183rd Street were opened for service.
- Born: Peggy Antonio, Australian cricketer, inaugural member of the Australia women's national cricket team; in Port Melbourne, Victoria, Australia (d. 2002)

== June 3, 1917 (Sunday) ==
- Tenth Battle of the Isonzo – A major Austro-Hungarian counteroffensive forced the Italians to give up nearly all the ground they had gained at the start of the battle on the border between northern Italy and Austria-Hungary.
- Battle of the Hills – The last German effort to retake ground lost to the French failed, forcing the command to call off further attacks. Since April 16, the Allies had captured c. 52,000 prisoners, 440 heavy and field guns, and more than 1,000 machine-guns.The Times History of the War. Vol. XIV (online scan ed.). London: The Times. 1914–1921. p. 106. OCLC 70406275 – via Archive Foundation.
- British cargo ship SS Hollington was torpedoed and sunk by German submarine SM U-95 in the Atlantic Ocean south of the Faroe Islands, with the loss of 30 crew members.
- Born: Leo Gorcey, American actor, best known for portraying young hooligans in the film serials Dead End Kids, East Side Kids and The Bowery Boys; in New York City, United States (d. 1969)

== June 4, 1917 (Monday) ==
- The first Pulitzer Prizes were awarded, with the winners selected by trustees from Columbia University. The winners included:
  - Laura E. Richards, Maud Howe Elliott and Florence Hall in biography or autobiography for Julia Ward Howe
  - Jean Jules Jusserand in history for With Americans of Past and Present Days.
  - Herbert Bayard Swope in reporting for article series " "Inside the German Empire" in New York World
  - New-York Tribune in editorial writing for an editorial article on the first anniversary of the sinking of the Lusitania
- French diplomat Jules Cambon sent a letter to Zionist leader Nahum Sokolow, expressing French sympathy for the creation of a Jewish state in Palestine.
- The Order of the British Empire was established as an order of chivalry by King George under the letters patent.
- British troopship Southland was torpedoed and sunk in the Atlantic Ocean by German submarine SM U-70, killing four men.
- Norwegian sports club Vestby was established in Vestby, Norway with sections for football, track and field, Nordic skiing and boxing.
- The outdoor amphitheatre for the St. Louis Municipal Opera Theatre, commonly referred to as The Muny, opened with its premiere performance of the Verdi opera Aida.
- Born:
  - Robert Merrill, American opera singer, best known for his work with the Metropolitan Opera; as Moishe Miller, in New York City, United States (d. 2004)
  - Howard Metzenbaum, American politician, U.S. Senator from Ohio from 1976 to 1995; in Cleveland, United States (d. 2008)
  - Charles Collingwood, American journalist, member of the Murrow Boys at CBS News; in Three Rivers, Michigan, United States (d. 1985)
- Died: John M. Haines, 54, American politician, 10th Governor of Idaho (b. 1863)

== June 5, 1917 (Tuesday) ==
- The first registration of conscription was held in the United States for all men between the ages of 21 and 31.
- The 1st Naval Air Unit of the United States Navy under command of Kenneth Whiting became the first American military unit to arrive in Europe.
- A Luftstreitkräfte (German Air Force) squadron of 22 Gotha bombers attacked a Royal Navy facility at Sheerness, England, in broad daylight, killing 13 people in exchange for the loss of one bomber, after the official second raid of Operation Türkenkreuz ("Turk's Cross"), failed to reach London, its original target.
- Royal Flying Corps Lieutenant Harold Satchell and Lieutenant Thomas Lewis of No. 20 Squadron shot down and killed German flying ace Lieutenant Karl Emil Schäfer. His 30 victories placed him in a tie with five other pilots as the 28th-highest-scoring German flying ace of World War I.

== June 6, 1917 (Wednesday) ==
- An attack on a British supply train by German aircraft prior the Battle of Messines disrupted the flow of ammunition to the Western Front, forcing British artillery to cease firing after three hours.
- The Sopwith Cuckoo, the first land plane designed for use as a torpedo bomber, was completed for the Royal Naval Air Service.
- Born:
  - Kirk Kerkorian, American business leader, president and CEO of Tracinda, which financed some of the largest resorts in Las Vegas including MGM Grand Las Vegas; as Kerkor Kerkorian, in Fresno, California, United States (d. 2015)
  - Moreese Bickham, American prisoner, convicted and later released for the 1958 killing of a sheriff's deputy that was reportedly a local Ku Klux Klan leader (d. 2016)

== June 7, 1917 (Thursday) ==
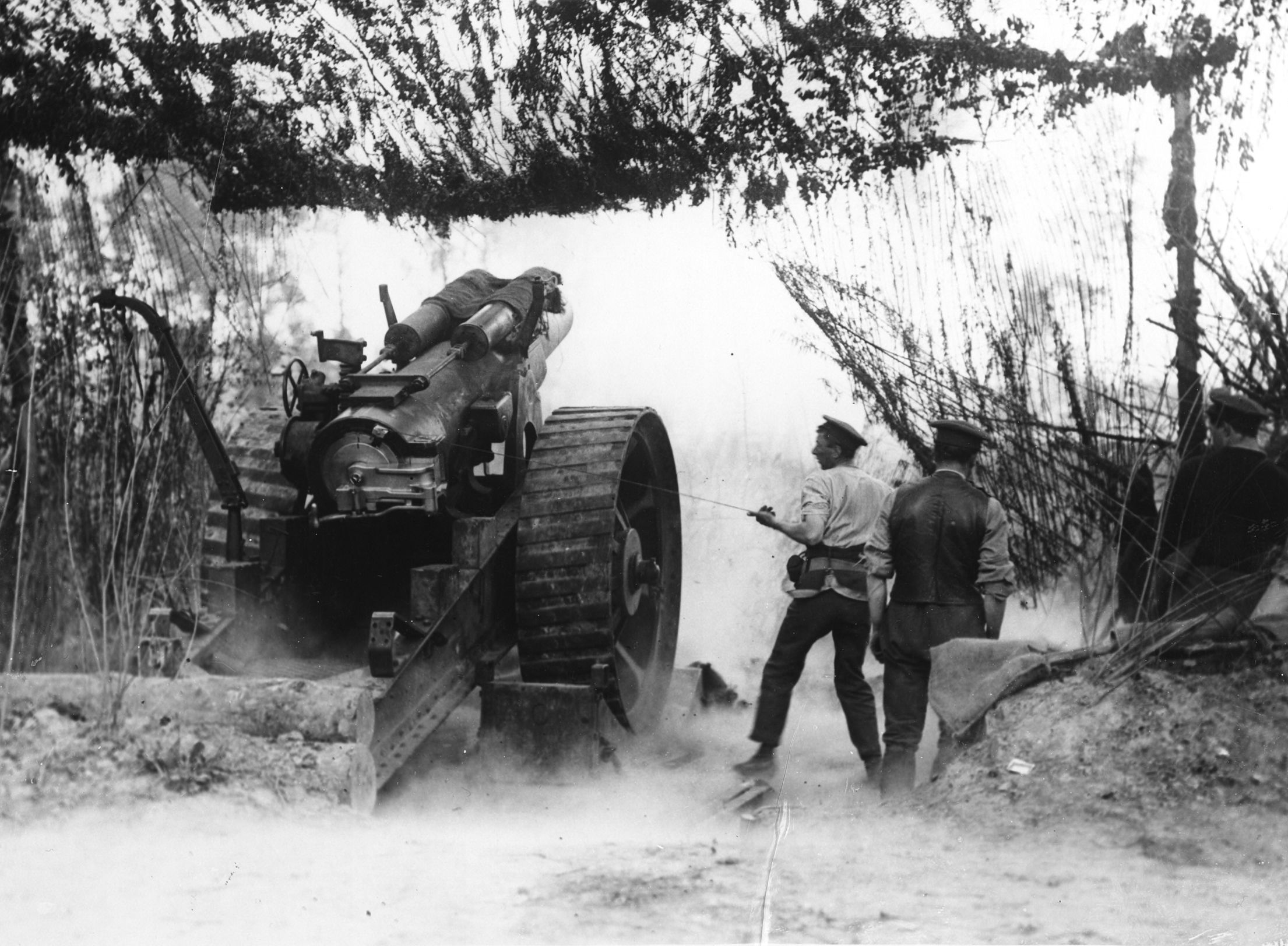
A British howitzer firing during the Battle of Messines

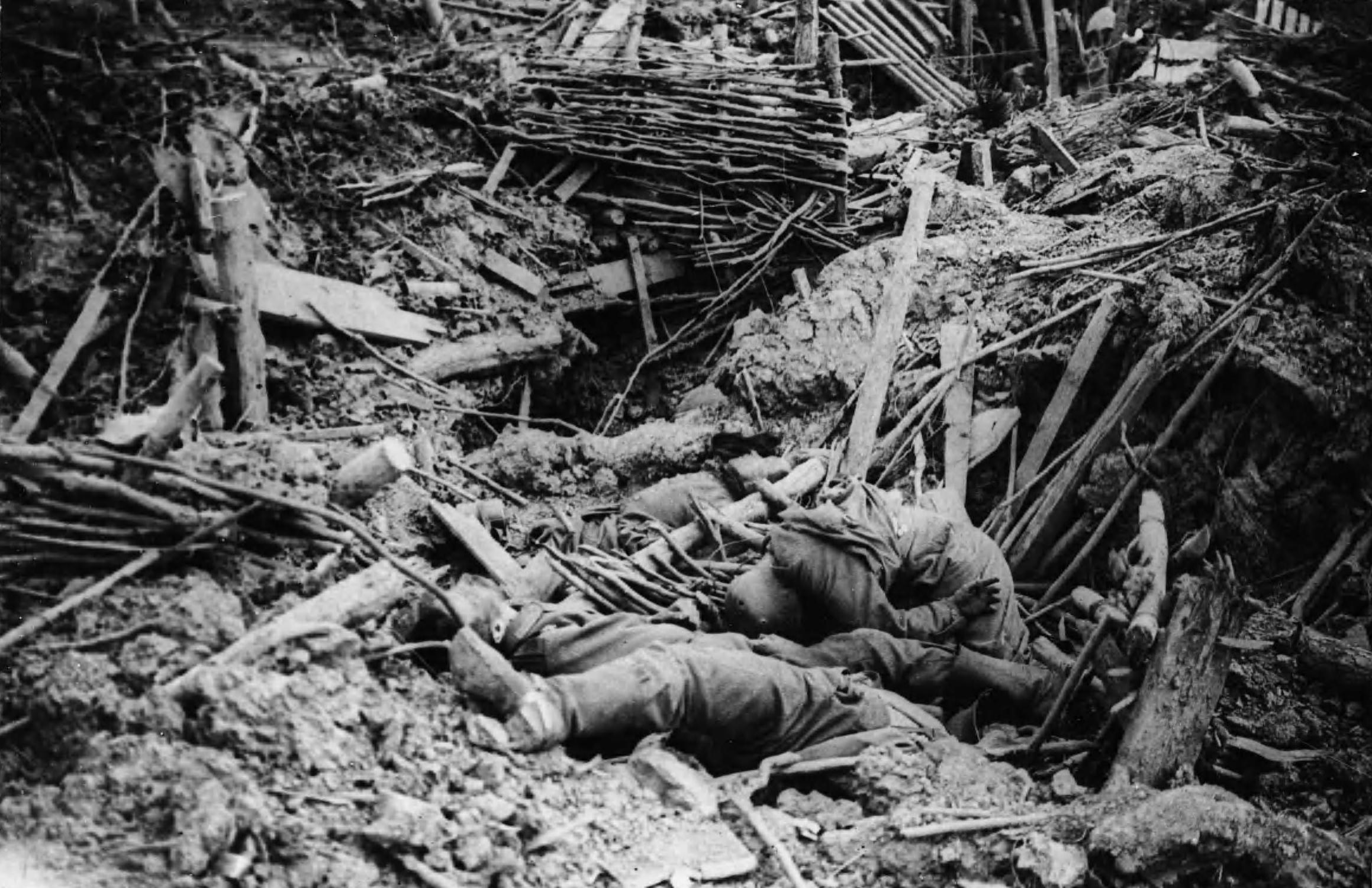
German trench destroyed by a mine explosion during the first day of the Battle of Messines.

- Battle of Messines – The British Army detonated 19 ammonal mines under the German lines near the Belgium village of Messines, killing 10,000 enemy soldiers in the deadliest deliberate non-nuclear man-made explosion in history.
- Capture of Wytschaete – The Irish 36th and 16th Divisions of the British Army IX Corps captured the municipality of Wytschaete in West Flanders, Belgium, from the German Fourth Army at a cost of 1,883 casualties, while German casualties were 3,563. The most noted casualty was Irish nationalist leader Willie Redmond, brother to Irish politician John Redmond, who was killed while leading an assault. His death was widely reported and he was awarded posthumously the Legion of Honour.
- Arthur Sifton won a fourth consecutive majority in the Alberta election. Louise McKinney and Roberta MacAdams were elected to the Legislative Assembly of Alberta, the first women in Canadian history to be voted into public office.
- Royal Navy ship HMS Pargust shelled and sank German submarine SM UC-29, killed all but three of the 25 crew on board.
- Eleven people were injured in a railway accident between Houten and Schalkwijk, Utrecht, Netherlands.
- The second section of the Djibouti-Ethiopian Railway was opened, with a 784 km-long rail line linking the port of Djibouti in French Somaliland to Addis Ababa, the capital of Ethiopia.
- Chicago businessman Melvin Jones founded the first Lions Club in Chicago. As of 2020, the service membership organization had over 1.4 million members worldwide.
- Swedish transit company Akersbanerne was established in Aker, Norway to operate the tramway system in the area.
- Born:
  - Gwendolyn Brooks, American poet, recipient for the Pulitzer Prize for Poetry for Annie Allen; in Topeka, Kansas, United States (d. 2000)
  - Dean Martin, American singer, best known for popular hits "Everybody Loves Somebody", "Memories Are Made of This" and "That's Amore", his comedic work with Martin and Lewis, member of the Rat Pack, and films roles including Rio Bravo and Ocean's 11; as Dino Paul Crocetti, in Steubenville, Ohio, United States (d. 1995)

== June 8, 1917 (Friday) ==
- Tenth Battle of the Isonzo – Italian General Luigi Cadorna called off the battle after an Austro-Hungarian counteroffensive succeeded in pushing Italian forces back to the starting point. Italy sustained 157,000 casualties while Austria-Hungary was lower at 75,000 casualties.
- French Army Mutinies – The French Army began to crack down on mutinying soldiers, resulting in 3,427 courts-martial. Close to 3,000 soldiers were sentenced to hard labor, and 629 were sentenced to death, although only 43 executions were actually carried out. Rather than severe discipline, French army command rebuilt morale through a combination of rest periods, frequent rotations of the front-line units and regular home leave.
- Battle of Messines – The Australian 52nd Battalion was mistaken for a German unit counterattacking and shelled, causing 325 casualties.
- French troopship Sequanna was sunk in the Bay of Biscay by German submarine SM UC-72 with the loss of 207 of the 665 people on board.
- Speculator Mine disaster – A fire at the Granite Mountain and Speculator ore mine outside Butte, Montana, killed at least 168 workers.
- An earthquake measuring 6.7 in magnitude struck La Libertad Department, El Salvador. Some of the devastation was around San Salvador with at least 101 deaths reported.
- The United States Army established the 1st Infantry Division, famously nicknamed "The Big Red One", at Fort Jay, New York, under command of brigadier general William L. Sibert. It also established the 1st and 2nd Brigade Combat Teams at Fort Wadsworth, New York.
- The U.S. Marines established the 5th Marine Regiment for service in Europe.
- New Zealand flying ace Thomas Culling was killed during a dogfight against a German naval plane. He had six victories to his credit when he died.
- The first test flight of the Beardmore bomber aircraft was conducted.
- Born:
  - George D. Wallace, American actor, best known for his lead role in the science fiction film serial Radar Men from the Moon and lead Broadway roles such as New Girl in Town; in New York City, United States (d. 2005)
  - Byron White, American football player and judge, Associate Justice of the Supreme Court of the United States from 1962 to 1993, played halfback for the Pittsburgh Pirates (NFL) and Detroit Lions from 1938 to 1941; in Fort Collins, Colorado, United States (d. 2002)
- Died: Charles Henry Brown, 45, New Zealand army officer, commander of the New Zealand 1st Brigade; killed in action during the Battle of Messines (b. 1872)

== June 9, 1917 (Saturday) ==
- The Norwegian Lutheran Church of America was established through the merger of three other Lutheran churches. It changed to its present-day name American Lutheran Church when it merged with two other Lutheran religious organizations in 1960.
- British army officer Victor Richardson died from a complication to a head injury he received during start of the Battle of Arras in April. His friend, Vera Brittain, immortalized his experiences and passing in her memoir Testament of Youth, along with her fiancé Roland Leighton, who was killed in action in 1915.
- The Persian political magazine Jangal released its first issue and would be active for about a year.
- Born: Eric Hobsbawm, British historian, best known for British economic trilogy The Age of Revolution, The Age of Capital and The Age of Empire; in Alexandria, Sultanate of Egypt (present-day Egypt) (d. 2012)
- Died: William Christopher Macdonald, 86, Canadian industrialist and academic, co-founder of Macdonald Tobacco, 4th Chancellor of McGill University (b. 1831)

== June 10, 1917 (Sunday) ==
- The Ukrainian People's Republic was established as part of the Russian Republic but later declared its independence January 25, 1918.
- Battle of Messines – Australian and New Zealand forces attacked the German-held village of Blauwepoortbeek, Belgium.
- Battle of Mount Ortigara – The Italian 52nd Alpine Division captured the summit of Mount Ortigara in Asiago, Italy, a key defensive position for the Austro-Hungarian Army.
- General Giacinto Ferrero, commander of Italian forces in Albania, promised freedom and independence of the country under the protection of Italy. The proclamation had been approved by Foreign Minister Sidney Sonnino without consulting the Council of Ministers, provoking strong reactions on the part of ministers including Republican Ubaldo Comandini and socialist reformists Leonida Bissolati and Ivanoe Bonomi, who presented their resignation in protest to Prime Minister Paolo Boselli.
- Royal Navy cruiser HMS Grafton was struck by a torpedo fired by German submarine SM UB-43 off the coast of Malta. However, the ship had been upgraded with anti-torpedo bulges in the hull that limited the damage and allowed the ship to get to port for repair.
- Born:
  - Evan Peter Aurand, American naval officer, son of naval officer Henry Aurand, commander of the USS Independence and USS Greenwich Bay, recipient of the Navy Cross and the Legion of Merit three times; in New York City, United States (d. 1989)
  - Ruari McLean, Scottish designer, best known for his typographical work with Penguin Books, and British magazines The Observer, The Economist, and New Scientist; as John David Ruari McDowall Hardie McLean, in Newton Stewart, Galloway, Scotland (d. 2006)
  - Al Schwimmer, American-Israeli business leader, founder and CEO of Israel Aerospace Industries; as Adolph William Schwimmer, in New York City, United States (d. 2011)

== June 11, 1917 (Monday) ==
- King Constantine abdicated the throne over internal and external pressure to allow Greece to participate in World War I and was succeeded by his son Alexander.
- Battle of Messines – The Germans evacuated Blauwepoortbeek, Belgium, allowing the Allies to secure their right flank of their front line east of Messines, Belgium.
- The Ekeberg Line for trams began operating in Oslo including stations Bråten, Ekebergparken, Holtet, Jomfrubråten, Kastellet, Sæter, Sørli, and Sportsplassen.
- Born:
  - Berle Adams, American music executive, co-founder of the Mercury Records and senior executive at MCA; as Beryl Adasky, in Chicago, United States (d. 2009)
  - Boyce McDaniel, American physicist, member of the Manhattan Project; in Brevard, North Carolina, United States (d. 2002)
  - Tom Davis, New Zealand state leader, second Prime Minister of the Cook Islands; as Thomas Robert Alexander Harries Davis, in Rarotonga, Cook Islands (d. 2007)

== June 12, 1917 (Tuesday) ==
- The United States Army established the 33rd, 35th, and 36th Aero Squadrons.
- The Adventist University of the Philippines was established in Silang, Cavite, Philippines as a Christian secondary school for boys and girls.
- The opera Palestrina by German composer Hans Pfitzner debuted at the Prince Regent Theater in Munich.
- Died: Teresa Carreño, 63, Venezuelan pianist and composer, known for her performance collaborations with English conductor Henry Wood, and compositions including Gottschalk Waltz and A Tear (b. 1853)

== June 13, 1917 (Wednesday) ==
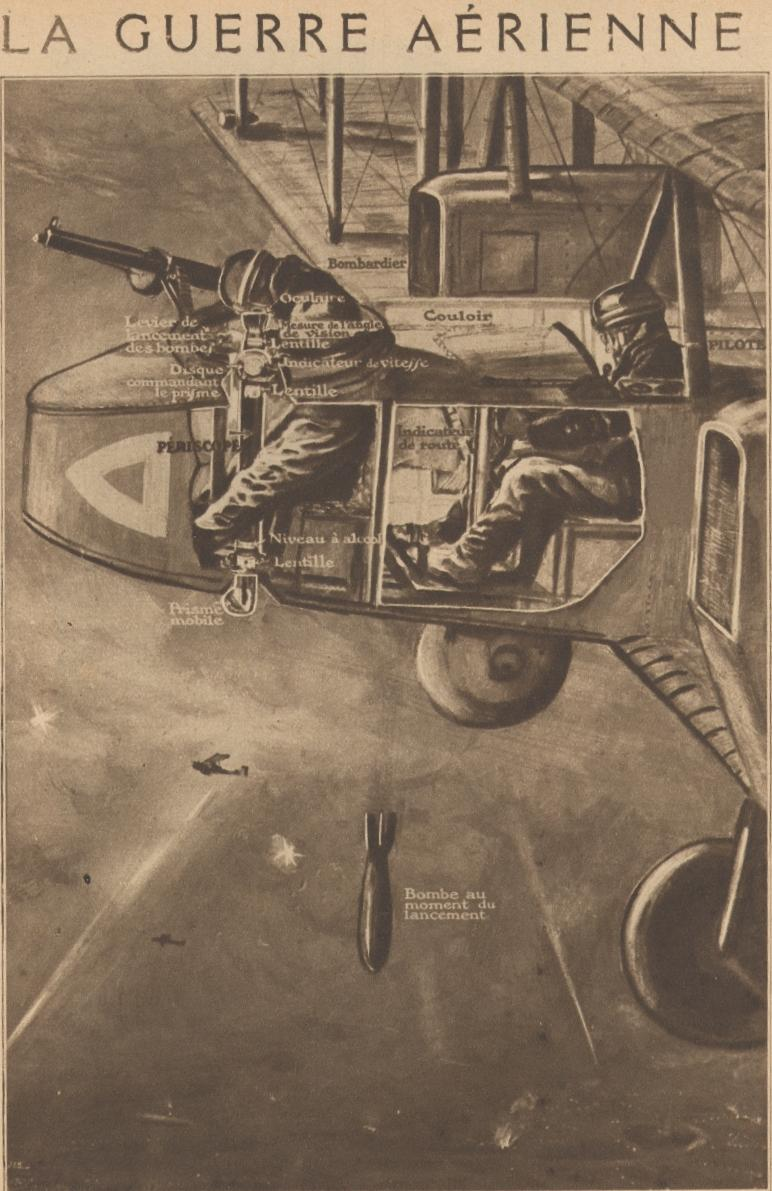
Contemporary illustration of a Gotha crew in action

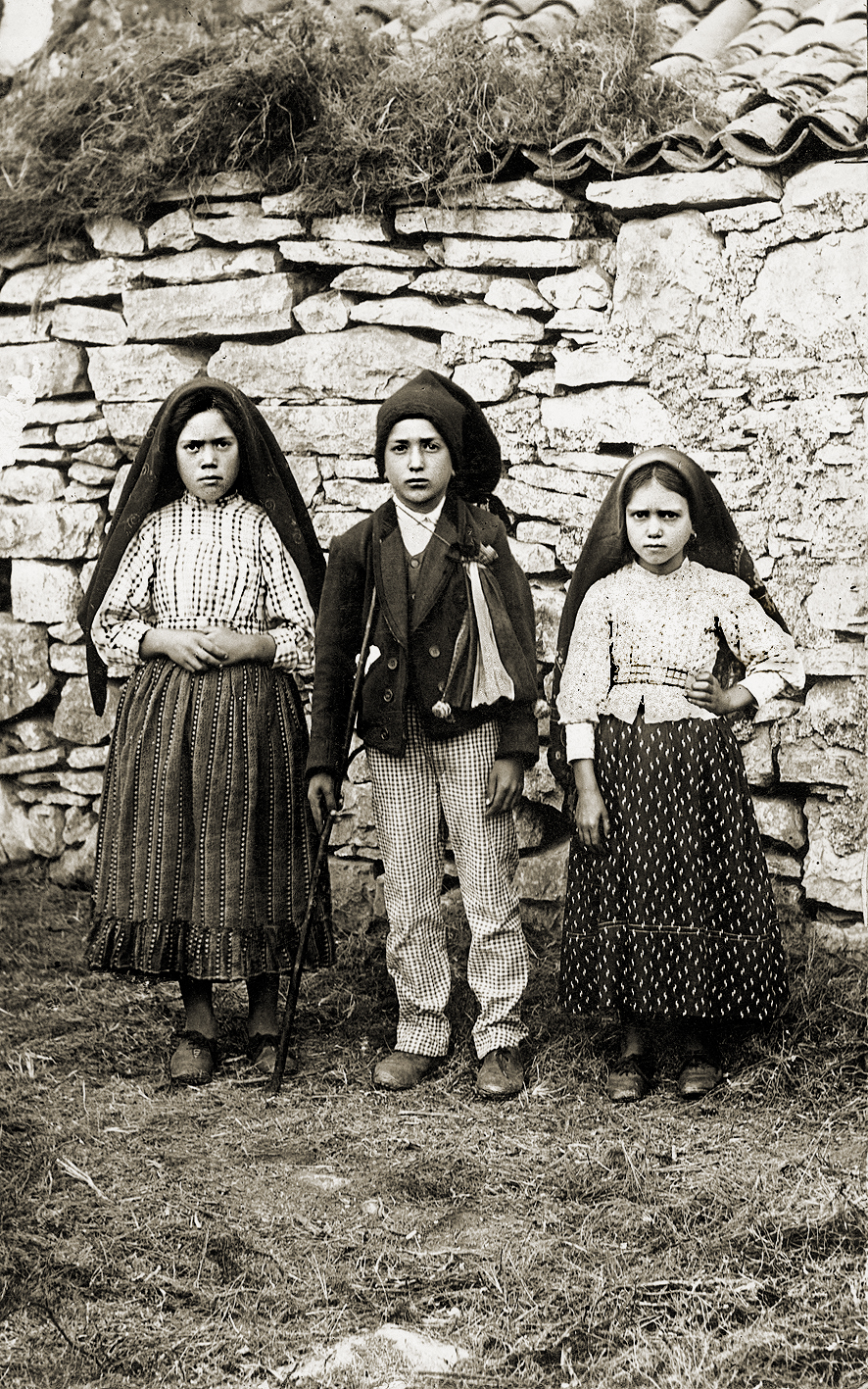
Lúcia dos Santos (left) with her cousins Francisco and Jacinta Marto, 1917

- The first major bombing raid on London killed 162 people and injured another 432, including more than 40 schoolchildren when a single bomb hit a primary school in Poplar, London. Despite 92 British aircraft taking off to intercept the raid, the 14 German Gotha bombers involved in the raid returned safely to base. As the third raid of Operation Türkenkreuz, a total of 118 bombs were dropped, inflicting more casualties in a single day than all the German airship attacks on England combined up to that point.
- An explosion at a munitions factory in Ashton-under-Lyne, England, killed 43 people and devastated much of the surrounding area.
- Ten-year-old Lúcia Santos and her cousins Francisco and Jacinta Marto of Cova da Iria, near Fátima, Portugal, experienced a second heavenly vision later named Our Lady of Fátima during the Feast of Saint Anthony. They were told Francisco and Jacinta would return to heaven soon while Lúcia would live longer to spread the message of the Immaculate Heart of Mary (the cousins died during the 1918 flu pandemic).
- U.S. Navy patrol ship USS McCulloch collided with a passenger ship and sank in the Pacific Ocean off the coast of California.
- American cargo ship Manchuria collided with U.S. Navy ship USS Amphitrite in New York Harbor. The ship was towed to Tompkinsville, Staten Island where it was repaired.
- The United States Army established the 21st, 25th, 30th, 37th, and 43rd Aero Squadrons.
- Oil industrialist Frank Phillips and his brother Lee founded the Phillips Petroleum Company in Bartlesville, Oklahoma, and began marketing many of its oil products as Phillips 66.
- Protestant secondary school Colegio San Andrés was founded in Lima by Scottish missionary John A. Mackay.
- Born:
  - Augusto Roa Bastos, Paraguayan writer, author of the novels Hijo de hombre and I, the Supreme; in Asunción, Paraguay (d. 2005)
  - Wim van Norden, Dutch journalist, founder of the resistance newspaper Het Parool during World War II; in Bussum, Netherlands (d. 2015)
- Died: Louis-Philippe Hébert, 67, Canadian sculpture, best known for statues of Canadian and British Empire leaders and pioneers in Ottawa, Quebec City and Montreal, including John A. Macdonald, George-Étienne Cartier, Alexander Mackenzie, and Queen Victoria (b. 1850)

== June 14, 1917 (Thursday) ==
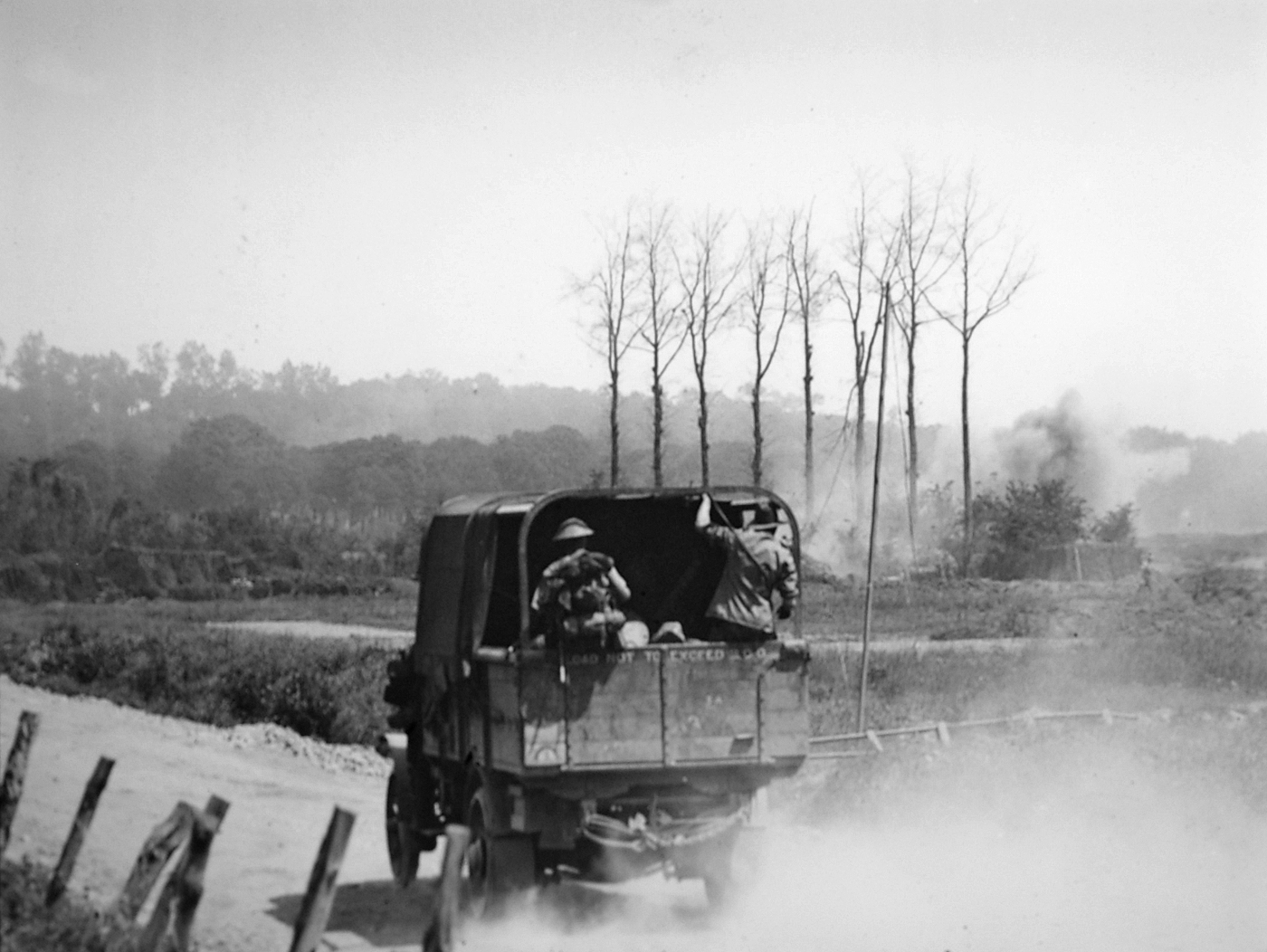
Australian truck near the front during the Battle of Messines.

- Battle of Messines – The British secured their front line near Messines, Belgium, formally ending the battle. Casualties for the Allies were 24,562 while German losses were estimated at 25,000, including 10,000 missing and 7,200 taken prisoner.
- German submarine SM U-82 sank British cargo ship Highbury in the Atlantic Ocean, killing all 40 crew on board.
- German submarine SM U-100 sank Norwegian cargo ship Cedarbank in the North Sea with the loss of 26 crew.
- A Royal Naval Air Service Curtiss flying boat shot down German Zeppelin L.43 over the North Sea, killing the entire crew.
- The United States Army air service established the 9th, 13th, and 19th Aero Squadrons.
- The Nan Hua High School for girls was established in Singapore, becoming a co-educational school in 1984.
- Born:
  - Lise Nørgaard, Danish journalist and writer, creator of the Danish television series Matador; as Elise Jensen, in Roskilde, Denmark (d. 2023)
  - Atle Selberg, Norwegian mathematician, recipient of the Fields Medal for work in analytic number theory; in Langesund, Norway (d. 2007)
  - Vlado Dapčević, Yugoslav revolutionary leader, partisan leader during World War II, opponent of Yugoslav President Josip Broz Tito, founder of the Party of Labour of Serbia; as Vladimir Dapčević, in Cetinje, Montenegro (d. 2001)
  - Walter T. Kerwin Jr., American army officer, United States Army Forces Command from 1973 to 1974, and Vice Chief of Staff of the United States Army from 1974 to 1978; in West Chester, Pennsylvania, United States (d. 2008)
- Died: Thomas W. Benoist, 42, American aircraft pilot, established the St. Petersburg–Tampa Airboat Line, the world's first scheduled airline (b. 1874)

== June 15, 1917 (Friday) ==
- The United States enacted the Espionage Act. On the same day, U.S. authorities made the first charges under the act against Blast magazine publisher Alexander Berkman and political activist Emma Goldman for "conspiracy to induce persons not to register" under conscription by way of editorials in their magazine.
- Senior officers with the Chinese Navy challenged the military authority of Duan Qirui, commander of the Beiyang Army in Beijing, by formally supporting the 1912 constitution prior to it being dissolved by the late president Yuan Shikai. The crisis led to current Chinese president Li Yuanhong to convince Duan to relent and allow the constitution to be reinstated.
- Norwegian passenger ship Kristianiafjord was wrecked off the coast of Newfoundland due to a navigation error, with all 1,144 passengers and crew on-board rescued.
- United States Navy cruiser USS Olympia ran aground in Long Island Sound off Block Island; it was later repaired and returned to service.
- Swedish murder defendant Hilda Nilsson was convicted on eight counts of murder (all foster children) and sentenced to death by guillotine.
- Pope Benedict released the encyclical Humani generis redemptionem, stating the increasing number of Christian preachers was inverse to the effect of that preaching on congregations.
- Australian Flying Corps established air squadrons No. 5 and No. 6.
- The United States Army established the 27th Aero Squadron.
- The Fremont Bridge opened for traffic in Seattle.
- Cocoa High School was established in Cocoa, Florida; it was renamed Rockledge High School in 1970.
- Born:
  - John B. Fenn, American chemist, recipient of the Nobel Prize in Chemistry for his work in analytical chemistry; in New York City, United States (d. 2010)
  - Lash LaRue, American actor, best known for character roles and stunt work in Westerns, famously taught Harrison Ford the bullwhip stunt work for the Indiana Jones trilogy; as Alfred LaRue, in Gretna, Louisiana, United States (d. 1996)
- Died:
  - Kristian Birkeland, 49, Norwegian physicist, discovered the Birkeland current which causes the aurora effect in polar regions, inventor of the coilgun (b. 1867)
  - Harry Buxton Forman, 74, British literary critic, noted biographer of poets Percy Shelley and John Keats, collaborated with Thomas James Wise on forging many first edition Georgian and Victorian works (b. 1842)

== June 16, 1917 (Saturday) ==
- The first All-Russian Congress of Soviets was held with close to 1,100 delegates in attendance, most with Socialist Revolutionary Party that supported the Russian Provisional Government.
- Five Imperial German Navy Zeppelins attempted a high-altitude raid on London but only two managed to arrive over England. Airship L 42 attacked Ramsgate, inflicting £29,000 pounds in damage, killing three civilians, and injuring another 14 civilians and two Royal Navy personnel. The second airship, L 48, bombed open fields outside Harwich, before Royal Flying Corps Lieutenant L. P. Watkins of No. 37 Squadron shot her down, killing 14 of the 17 men on board and fatally injuring one of the survivors.
- The Luftstreitkräfte, the air arm of the Imperial German Army, established air squadron Jagdstaffel 81.
- The United States Army established the 17th, 18th, and 22nd Aero Squadrons.
- Born:
  - Katharine Graham, American publisher, editor of The Washington Post during the Watergate scandal, recipient of the Pulitzer Prize for Biography or Autobiography for her memoir Personal History; as Katharine Meyer, in New York City, United States (d. 2001)
  - Irving Penn, American photographer, best known for his work with Vogue; in Plainfield, New Jersey, United States (d. 2009)
- Died: Joseph Diggle, 68, British clergy, chair of the London School Board from 1885 to 1894 (b. 1849)

== June 17, 1917 (Sunday) ==
- The Dominion of Newfoundland adopted daylight saving time, becoming the first jurisdiction in North America to do so.
- Royal Navy destroyer HMS Tartar struck a mine and was damaged in the English Channel with the loss of 45 of her crew.
- U.S. Army Colonel Raynal Bolling traveled to France as head of the U.S. aeronautical commission to study the types of military aircraft being used by the Allies, and determine what types of aircraft to be manufactured in the United States for Allied use.
- Charlie Chaplin released the romantic comedy The Immigrant with Edna Purviance, a regular lead in his films, as the love interest.
- Born: Dufferin Roblin, Canadian politician, 14th Premier of Manitoba; in Winnipeg, Canada (d. 2010)
- Died: José Manuel Pando, 67, Bolivian state leader, 30th President of Bolivia (b. 1849)

== June 18, 1917 (Monday) ==
- The Luftstreitkräfte established air squadron Jagdstaffel 41.
- Born:
  - Richard Boone, American actor, best known for his work in Westerns including the television series Have Gun – Will Travel; in Los Angeles, United States (d. 1981)
  - Tang Ti-sheng, Chinese opera singer and composer, known for works including Bird at Sunset, Red Tears of an Aspen and The Reincarnation of Lady Plum Blossom; as Tang Kang-nien, in Heilongjiang, Republic of China (present-day China) (d. 1959)
  - Jack Womer, American soldier, member of the Filthy Thirteen of the 101st Airborne Division during World War II, recipient of the Legion of Honour and Bronze Star Medal; in Lewistown, Pennsylvania, United States (d. 2013)
- Died:
  - Titu Maiorescu, 77, Romanian state leader, 23rd Prime Minister of Romania (b. 1840)
  - Robert Bell, 76, Canadian geologist, credited with naming over 3,000 geographic features in Canada, including mappings for the Hudson Bay, Lake Superior and the Athabasca oil sands (b. 1841)

== June 19, 1917 (Tuesday) ==
- French Navy submarine Ariane was torpedoed and sunk in the Mediterranean Sea off the coast of Tunisia by German submarine SM UC-22.
- A partial solar eclipse occurred over the Arctic Ocean.
- Born:
  - Robert Karnes, American actor, best known for his supporting role in the television crime series The Lawless Years; in Paducah, Kentucky, United States (d. 1979)
  - Robert Baker Aitken, American religious leader, founding member of the Buddhist Peace Fellowship; in Philadelphia, United States (d. 2010)
  - Joshua Nkomo, Zimbabwe state leader, first Vice-President of Zimbabwe; in Matopos, Southern Rhodesia (present-day Matobo, Zimbabwe) (d. 1999)

== June 20, 1917 (Wednesday) ==
- The British war cabinet increased the size of the Royal Flying Corps from 108 to 200 squadrons, with most of increase coming in bomber units.
- United States Secretary of the Navy Josephus Daniels rejected U.S. Navy Lieutenant Kenneth Whiting's proposal to acquire a ship with an aircraft catapult and a flight deck, the first serious consideration of acquiring aviation ships since the American Civil War.
- A rail line 20 miles (32.2 kilometres) in length between Gingindlovu and Eshowe, South Africa was completed.

== June 21, 1917 (Thursday) ==
- Aubin-Edmond Arsenault replaced John Alexander Mathieson to become the 13th Premier of Prince Edward Island.
- The United States Army established the 8th and 12th Aero Squadrons.
- Died: Robert Broadwood, 55, British army officer, noted commander during the Second Boer War and World War I (b. 1862)

== June 22, 1917 (Friday) ==
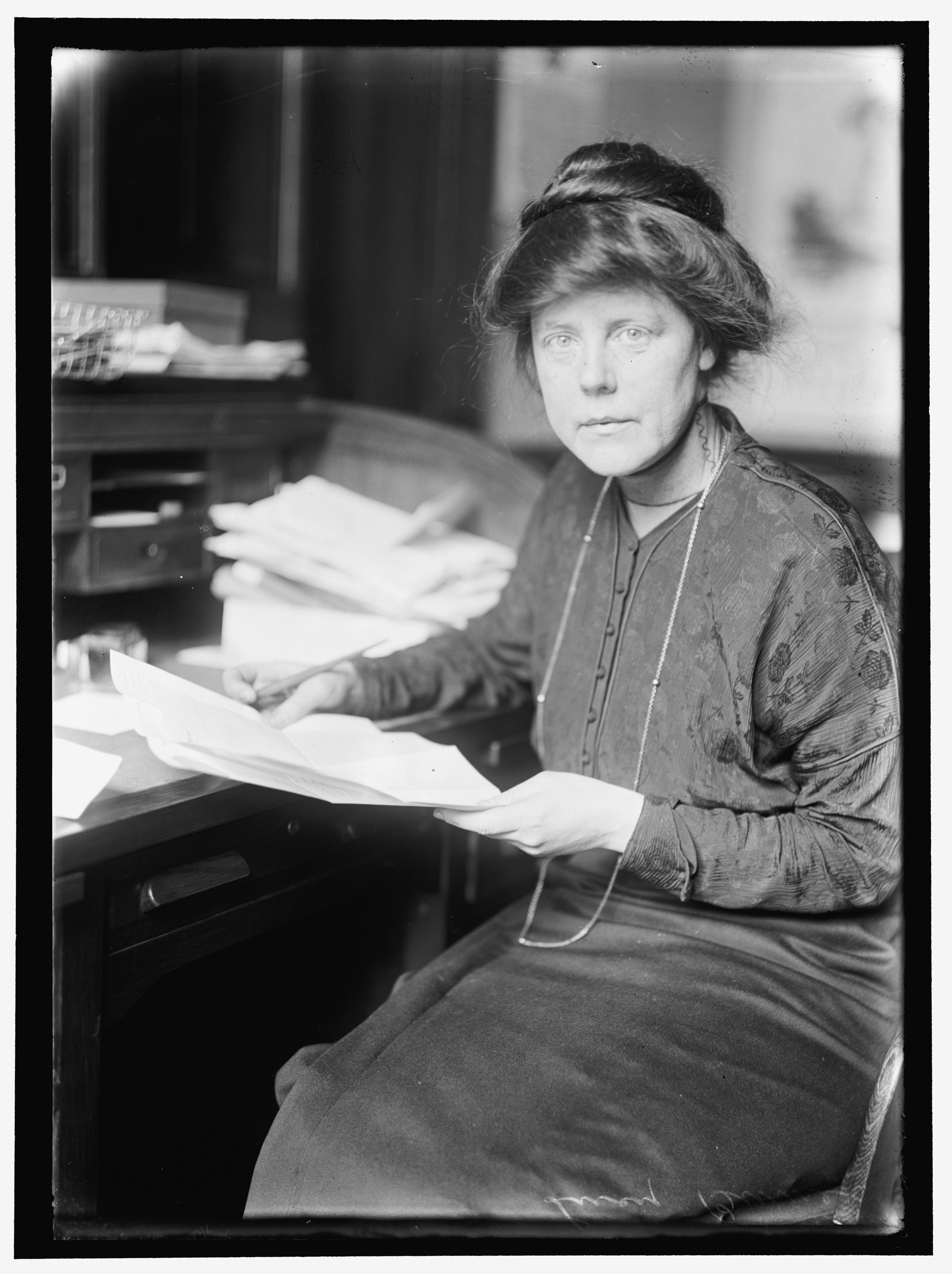
Suffragist Lucy Burns

- Police in Washington, D.C., arrested Lucy Burns, a prominent member of the suffragist protest group Silent Sentinels, for obstructing traffic with a banner quoting U.S. President Woodrow Wilson's speech to United States Congress: "We shall fight for the things which we have always carried nearest our hearts—for democracy, for the right of those who submit to authority to have a voice in their own governments." The charges were later dropped.
- The United States Army established the 28th Aero Squadron.
- The British Port Victoria fighter aircraft was first flown.
- Died:
  - Yevgeni Bauer, 51-52, Russian film director, one of the founding filmmakers of Russian cinema including films Silent Witnesses and The King of Paris (b. 1865)
  - Kristian Zahrtmann, 74, Danish painter, member of the realism and naturalism movements in Denmark and historical Danish subjects (b. 1843)

== June 23, 1917 (Saturday) ==
- Italy established a protectorate over Albania in an effort to secure a de jure independent Albania under Italian control (until the summer of 1920).
- The German sailing ship Priwall was launched by Blohm & Voss in Hamburg. The ship was primarily used for shipping nitrate along South America.
- Norwegian-American tennis player Molla Bjurstedt retained her championship title in the U.S. National Women's Singles Championships by defeating Marion Vanderhoef in three sets.
- In baseball's greatest relief effort, Eddie Shore of the Boston Red Sox retired all 26 batters he faced to gain a 4–0 victory over the Washington Senators. Shore relived Babe Ruth with nobody out and a man on first, who was cut down stealing.

== June 24, 1917 (Sunday) ==
- The Luftstreitkräfte (German Air Force) combined four fighter squadrons to form Jagdgeschwader 1, the first German (fighter wing). Manfred von Richthofen was promoted to commanding officer of the unit.
- Douglas Fairbanks starred in the Western Wild and Woolly, co-starring Eileen Percy and directed by John Emerson. The film was considered a personal favorite of Fairbanks. Prints of the film are preserved in the Library of Congress and National Film Registry.
- Born:
  - Joan Clarke, British mathematician, member of the code-breaking team at Bletchley Park during World War II, recipient of the Order of the British Empire; in West Norwood, London, England (d. 1996)
  - David Easton, Canadian-born American political scientist, developer of the political systems theory; in Toronto, Canada (d. 2014)

== June 25, 1917 (Monday) ==
- Battle of Mount Ortigara – Shock troops with the Austro-Hungarian Army pushed 11 Italian divisions off the Mount Ortigara summit, regaining their important defensive position in Asiago, Italy. Italy suffered 23,000 casualties while Austria-Hungary sustained only 9,000 casualties.
- Twelve women with the Silent Sentinels, including Mabel Vernon and Annie Arniel from Delaware, were arrested for obstructing traffic in Washington, D.C. The women forwent the $10 fine and instead chose to be jailed for three days.
- The British Army established the 75th Division under command of Brigadier-General Philip Palin using British, Indian and South African units, including the Palin's former unit, the 29th Indian Brigade.
- "Fatty" Arbuckle and Buster Keaton co-directed and starred in the film comedy The Rough House. It was the first film for Keaton behind the camera lens.
- Ted "Kid" Lewis regained the World Welterweight Championship from Jack Britton and held it until 1919.
- Born: Nils Karlsson, Swedish cross-country skier, gold medalist at the 1948 Winter Olympics; in Östnor, Sweden (d. 2012)

== June 26, 1917 (Tuesday) ==
- William Melville Martin won a fourth consecutive majority in the Saskatchewan election.
- An earthquake measuring 8.5 struck Samoa, the strongest ever recorded for that region. The quake created a tsunami measuring 40 feet in height that damaged parts of Samoa.
- Bisbee Deportation – Miners who were members of the Industrial Workers of the World trade union voted to strike at Copper Queen Mine, owned by Phelps Dodge, near Bisbee, Arizona.
- The 11th, 20th, and 31st Aero Squadrons of the United States Army were established.
- Born:
  - Ludwig Franzisket, German air force officer, commander of Jagdgeschwader 27 of the Luftwaffe during World War II, recipient of the Knight's Cross of the Iron Cross; in Düsseldorf, German Empire (present-day Germany) (d. 1988)
  - Peer de Silva, American intelligence officer, chief of station for the Central Intelligence Agency in Korea, Vietnam, and Thailand during the Cold War, recipient of the Legion of Merit; in San Francisco, United States (d. 1978)
- Died:
  - John Dunville, 21, British army officer, recipient of the Victoria Cross; killed in action (b. 1896)
  - Dragutin Dimitrijević, 40, Serbian army officer, leader of secret Serbian military society Black Hand; executed (b. 1876)

== June 27, 1917 (Wednesday) ==
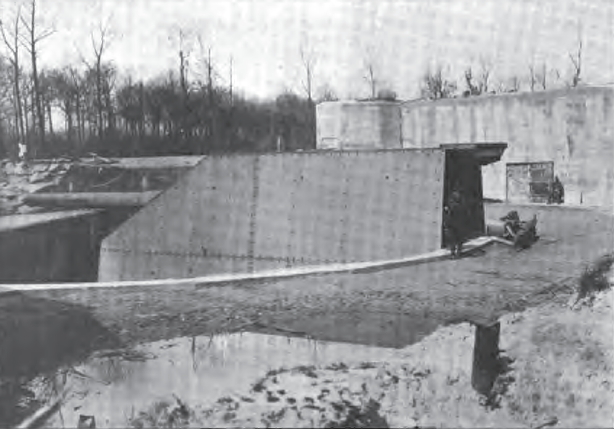
Batterie Pommern, aka 'Long Max' in Koekelare, Belgium, biggest gun in the world in 1917.

- The Germans completed Batterie Pommern, the world's largest gun, in Koekelare, Belgium. It fired its first barrage the same day into Dunkirk 31 mi (50 km) away.
- French Navy cruiser Kléber struck a mine and sank in the Bay of Biscay with the loss of 42 of her crew.
- French Navy cruiser Doxa was torpedoed and sunk in the Aegean Sea by German submarine SM UB-47, with the loss of 29 lives.
- German flying ace Lieutenant Karl Allmenröder was shot down and killed. His 30 victories tied him with five other pilots as the 28th-highest-scoring German ace of World War I.
- Born: Prenk Jakova, Albanian composer, known for works including the opera Mrika; in Shkodër, Albania (d. 1969, by suicide)

== June 28, 1917 (Thursday) ==
- British and Canadian troops captured Oppy Wood near Arras, France, from the Germans with less than a quarter of the casualties lost from an assault on the wood two months earlier.
- British cargo ship Don Arturo was torpedoed and sunk in the Atlantic Ocean by German submarine SM UC-62 with the loss of all 34 crew.
- Food shortages in the Netherlands, particularly potatoes, due to World War I created unrest in Amsterdam.
- Royal Naval Air Service flight commander Frederick Rutland used the recently commissioned Sopwith Pup aircraft to make the first successful take off from a flying-off platform that was mounted on Royal Navy light cruiser HMS Yarmouth.
- William Waldorf Astor, an American expatriate of the Astor family who became a British citizen, was awarded the noble title Viscount Astor by British monarchy for his contributions to business and finance in the United Kingdom.

== June 29, 1917 (Friday) ==
- The 4th Artillery Regiment of Portugal was established.
- Born:
  - Archie Green, Canadian-American folklore critic, credited for lobbying for legislation that lead to the establishment of the American Folklife Center; as Aaron Green, in Winnipeg, Canada (d. 2009)
  - Mary Berry, British conductor, founder of the Schola Gregoriana of Cambridge to revive the art of Gregorian chant (d. 2008)
- Died: Frans Schollaert, 65, Belgian state leader, 19th Prime Minister of Belgium (b. 1851)

== June 30, 1917 (Saturday) ==
- Italian Socialist leader Filippo Turati called on the government to start peace negotiations.
- Royal Navy destroyer HMS Cheerful struck a mine and sank in the Atlantic Ocean with the loss of 40 of her 62 crew.
- The Luftstreitkräfte established air squadrons Jagdstaffel 38, 39 and 40.
- The U.S. Navy battleship Idaho was launched by New York Shipbuilding in Camden, New Jersey. It was most famous for supporting the major amphibious landings during World War II against the Japanese in the Pacific War before it was decommissioned in 1946.
- The Bengali-language romance novel Devdas by Sarat Chandra Chattopadhyay was published. The novel became so popular it was adapted to film at least sixteen times in seven different languages, making it the most popular non-epic story in India.
- The movie house UC Theatre opened in Berkeley, California. The theater gained notoriety for the grindhouse and arthouse movie experience in 1970s and 1990s. In 2016, it was renovated and reopened again by the Berkeley Music Group as a live music venue.
- Born:
  - Susan Hayward, American actress, recipient of Academy Award for Best Actress for I Want to Live! as well as her Oscar-nominated role in Smash-Up, the Story of a Woman; as Edythe Marrenner, in New York City, United States (d. 1975)
  - Judson Crews, American poet, known for various poetry collections including A Unicorn When Needs Be and The Clock of Moss; in Waco, Texas, United States (d. 2010)
  - Lena Horne, American singer and actress, best known for her hit songs "Something to Live For", "Chelsea Bridge", and "Stormy Weather", winner of four Grammy Awards and an Emmy Award for Lena Horne: The Lady and Her Music; in New York City, United States (d. 2010)
- Died:
  - Antonio de La Gándara, 55, French painter, known for such works as Portrait of Madame X (b. 1861)
  - Dadabhai Naoroji, 91, Indian politician, first Asian to become a British Member of Parliament, co-founder of the Indian National Congress (b. 1825)
