= Dapčević =

Dapčević (Serbian: Дапчевић) is a Slavic surname. It may refer to:

- Peko Dapčević (1913–1999), Montenegrin and Yugoslav communist, commander of the Yugoslav 1st Army
- Tijana Todevska-Dapčević (born 1976), Macedonian-Serbian pop singer
- Vlado Dapčević (1917–2001), Montenegrin and Yugoslav communist, political prisoner and dissident, founder of Party of Labour
