= Die Welt (Herzl) =

Zionist newspaper, founded by Theodor Herzl

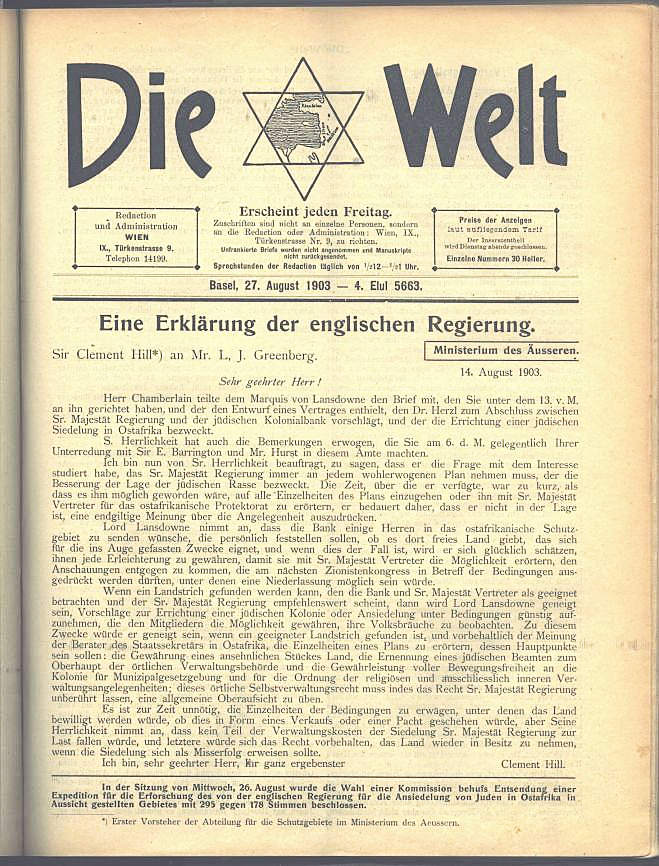
- A 1903 edition of Die Welt
- Type: Weekly
- Owner: World Zionist Organization
- Publisher: Theodor Herzl
- Founded: 4 June 1897
- Ceased publication: 1914
- Political alignment: Zionism
- Headquarters: Vienna, Berlin

Die Welt (German pronunciation: [diː ˈvɛlt], "The World") was a weekly newspaper founded by Theodor Herzl in May 1897 in Vienna. It was designed to promote Zionism and boldly proclaimed itself to be a Judenblatt (Jew-paper). From 1897 to 1914 it was the principal organ of the Zionist movement. From 1897 to 1900, the paper was edited by Erwin Rosenberger.

== History ==
Die Welt was published weekly in Herzl's own publishing house. He developed the idea in May 1897, noting in his journal that Die Welt would be the definitive mass-circulation outlet for the Zionist Organization, and that such a journal was "a necessity that can no longer be ignored." The first issue appeared on 4 June 1897. Shortly before, on 14 May, Herzl wrote to his supporter Max Nordau, joking that "The Neue Freie Presse is like my legitimate wife. With Die Welt I am maintaining a mistress – I can only hope that she will not ruin me". The editorial in the first issue stated that Die Welt promoted "the reconciling solution to the Jewish question". Production was based initially in Vienna, but later moved to Berlin.

In 1907, Nahum Sokolow launched Ha-ʿOlam, the Zionist Organization's weekly newspaper in Hebrew, as a section of Die Welt.

== Content ==
The journal's circulation varied widely, usually reaching at least 3,000 copies sold, and sometimes more than 10,000 copies.

Die Welt had a mix of content. As well as information about the Zionist movement and news of Jewish settlement in Palestine, it reported on general news relevant to Judaism or Zionism, including the spread of anti-Semitism. The Dreyfus Affair was unfolding during its run, and it regularly reported on new developments. It also published an article written by Dreyfus himself on Zionism. The journal was also opposed to assimilationist strands within Western Judaism.

It included cultural and philosophical essays and translations from Hebrew and Yiddish literature. It sought articles from non-Jews promoting Zionism as a solution to the "Jewish question", and remained largely uncritically focussed on the positive aspects of the aspiration, tending to ignore objections. Controversy was created by an extremely aggressive article by Nordau attacking the cultural Zionist Ahad Ha'am, who had challenged Herzl's vision. Nordau's abusive language, calling Ha'am "crippled, hunchbacked" and the "despised slave of intolerant knout-wielding pogromchiks", caused outrage among Jewish nationalists and Zionists.

== Contributors ==
- Editors: Paul Naschauer (de jure); Berthold Feiwel; A. H. Reich; Leopold Kahn; Julius Uprimny; Siegmund Werner; Nahum Sokolow; Isidor Schalit; Erwin Rosenberger; Leon Kellner; Isidor Marmorek; Jacob Klatzkin; and Martin Buber.
- Editorial staff: S. R. Landau; Siegmund Werner; Erwin Rosenberger; Berthold Feiwel; A. H. Reich; Julius Uprimny; Abraham Coralnik; Julius Berger; Maurice Zobel; N. Golant; Kurt Blumenfeld.
- Executive Director: Alexander Ritter von Eiss (1897 – October 1902); he was succeeded by Heinrich Polturak.

== Other versions ==
Short-lived Hebrew and Yiddish editions of the journal were published in 1900. In addition, a differently-titled Spanish Zionist magazine (El Progreso) was issued by Herzl, but existed only briefly.

The journal folded on the outbreak of war in 1914. After the war, Zionist periodicals emerged as successors of Die Welt, including the daily Wiener Morgenzeitung (1919–1927); the monthly magazine Palästina (1927–1938); the weekly Jüdische Presse (1915–1934); and Robert Stricker's Die Neue Welt (1927–1938).
