= Saul Raphael Landau =

Polish Jewish lawyer and Zionist activist

- שאול רפאל לנדאו
- Born: 1870; Kraków, Poland
- Died: 16 July 1943 (age 79–80); New York City, US
- Occupations: lawyer, journalist, publicist, zionist activist

Signature
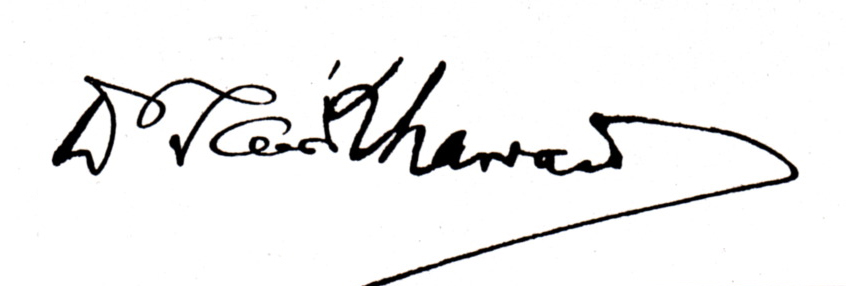

Saul Raphael (also spelled Rafael) Landau (Hebrew: שאול רפאל לנדאו; 1870–1943) was a Polish Jewish lawyer, journalist, publicist and Zionist activist.

== Life ==
Landau was born in 1870 in Kraków.

Between 1893 and 1895 he lectured in Polish language and literature at the newly opened Israelitisch-Theologische Lehranstalt (Israelite Theological School) in Vienna. In February 1896, he became acquainted with Theodor Herzl and became an enthusiastic colleague of his and for a short time one of his closest confidants. He took over the editing of the Zionist weekly Die Welt, which appeared for the first time on 4 June 1897. At the same time, he became a correspondent for the London weekly Jewish Chronicle. After tensions developed between Landau and Herzl, he had to hand over the editorial management of Die Welt to Siegmund Werner in October 1897. In May 1898, Landau founded an independent socialist Zionist organization called "Achwah" (Hebrew: אחווה, lit. 'the Brotherhood') and as its organ, the monthly Der jüdische Arbeiter (August 1898 to June 1899). In 1907, he began to publish the Neue National-Zeitung (as a continuation of the Jüdisch Volksblatt) until 1916, when he was drafted into military service. From 1900 and after, he worked mainly as a lawyer. In 1938, he emigrated to London and in 1941 to the United States.

He died on 16 July 1943, in New York City.

== Works ==
- Sionizm, 1897. (in Polish)
- Der Polenklub und seine Hausjuden: Grundlinien der jüdischen Volkspolitik in Österreich, 1907. (in German)
- Sturm und Drang im Zionismus: Rückblicke eines Zionisten vor, mit und um Theodor Herzl, Wien: 1937 (in German) – memoir, includes correspondence with Herzl
