= Ha-Olam =

Ha-ʿOlam
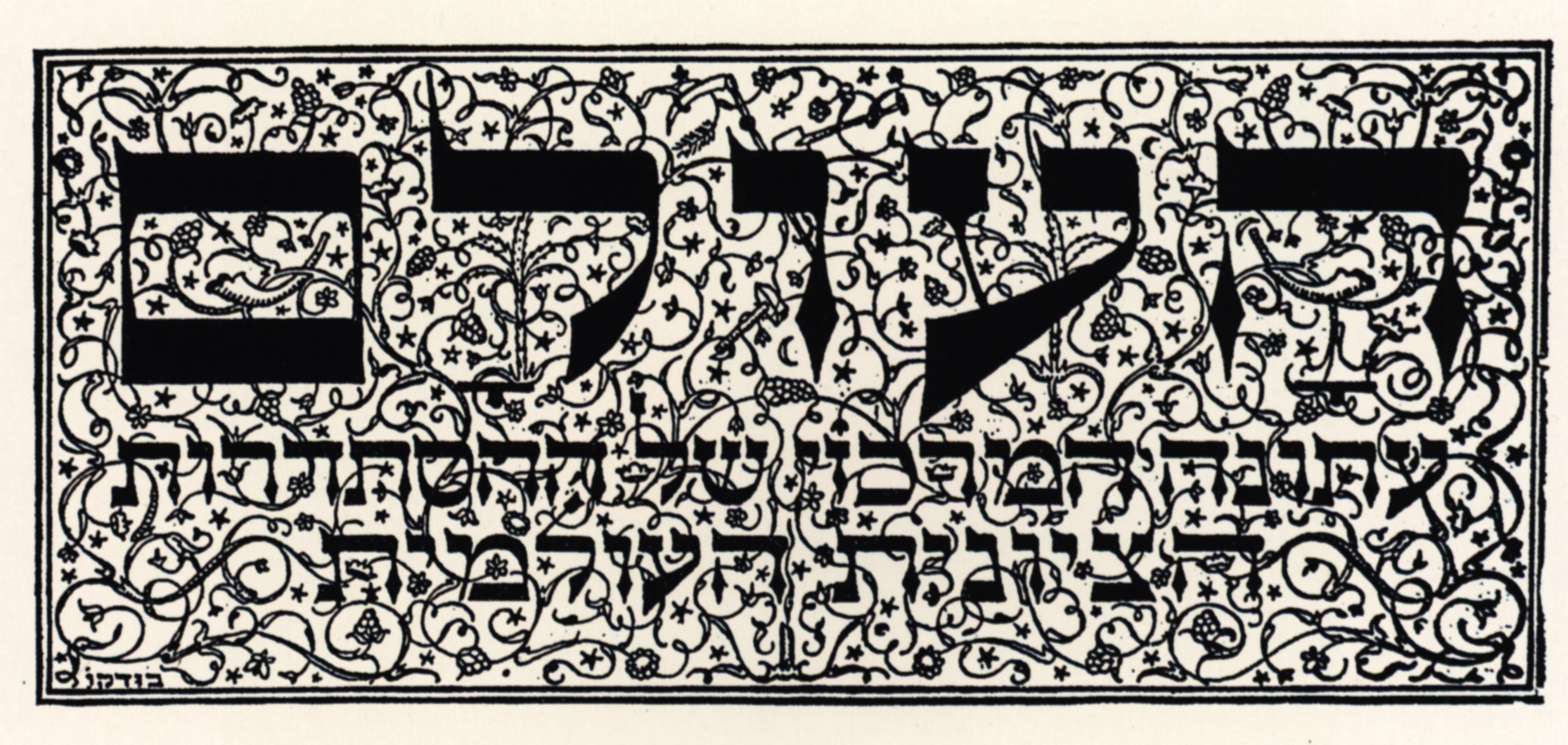
- Masthead (nameplate) in the 1920s.
- Publisher: Zionist Organization
- Founded: January 1, 1907
- Ceased publication: February 28, 1950
- Language: Modern Hebrew

Ha-ʿOlam (Hebrew: העולם, lit. 'The World') was a Hebrew-language weekly newspaper and the official organ of the Zionist Organization (the World Zionist Organization after 1960), published from 1907 to 1950.

== History ==
It was started by Nahum Sokolow as a Hebrew section of Die Welt, organ of the Zionist Organization in Germany. It was published in Cologne 1907–08, Vilna and Odessa 1909–1914 under Alter Druyanov, in London in 1919 and 1920 under Abraham Idelson, and Berlin 1923 and 1924. In 1937, the paper was published in Jerusalem under Moshe Kleinmann until his death in 1948.

== Content ==
It published on matters concerning the Zionist movement, and news and events in Palestine (Eretz Israel) and in the Jewish communities throughout the world.
