= UC Theatre =

Music venue and former movie theater in Berkeley, California, United States

The UC Theatre
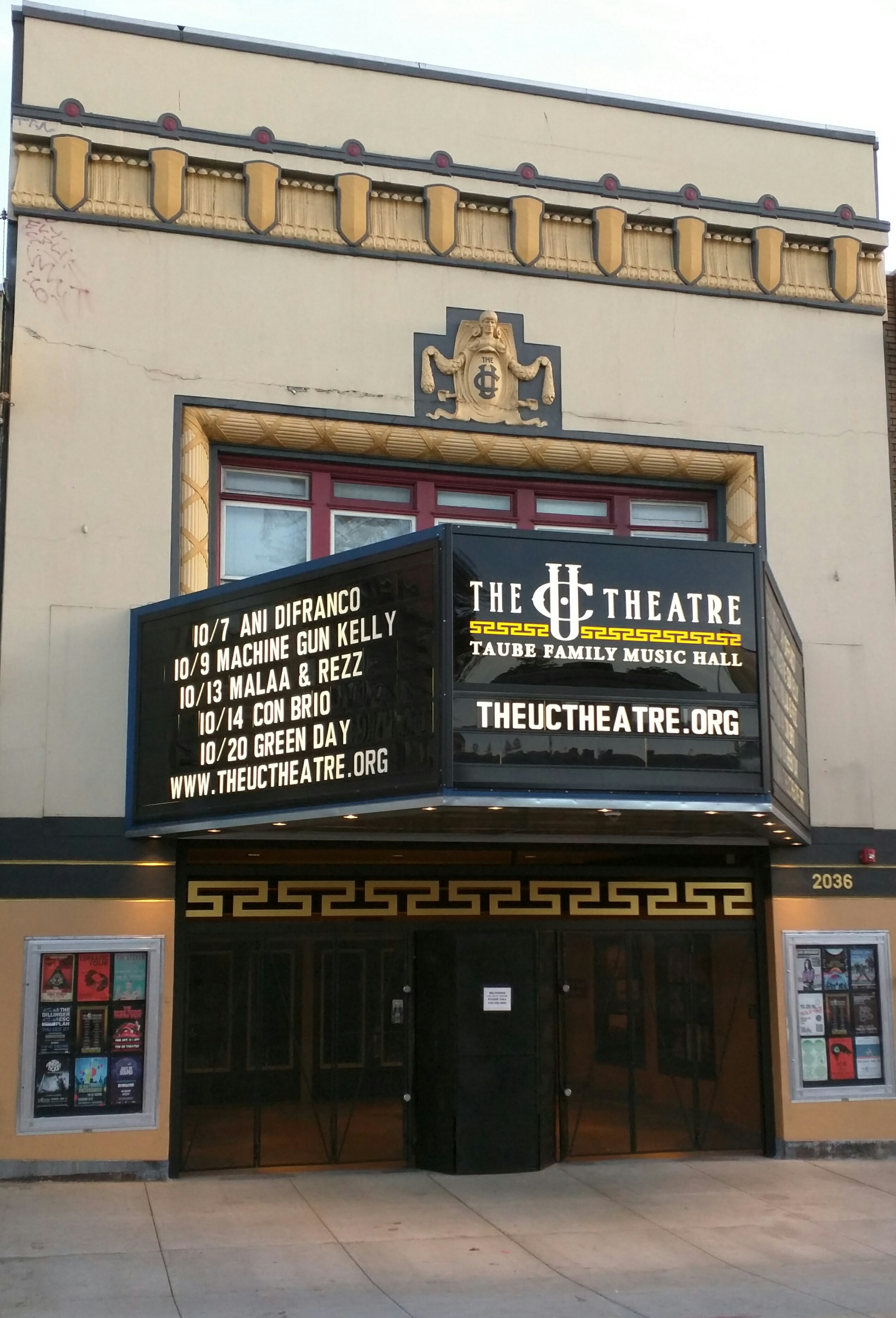

- Location within Oakland, California
- Address: 2036 University Avenue, Berkeley, California, U.S.
- Coordinates: 37°52′17″N 122°16′11″W
- Owner: The Berkeley Music Group
- Capacity: 1,400
- Current use: live music venue
- Public transit: Downtown Berkeley

Construction
- Opened: June 30, 1917
- Closed: March 2001
- Reopened: April 7, 2016
- Rebuilt: March 2015–March 2016
- Architects: James W. Plachek (1916); Robert Remiker (2014)

Website
- www.theuctheatre.org

The UC Theatre is a music venue on University Avenue near Shattuck Avenue in Downtown Berkeley, Berkeley, California, United States. From 1976 until 2001, it was a movie theater known for a revival house presentation of films. In 2013, The Berkeley Music Group was formed as a 501(c)(3) nonprofit organization with the mission to renovate and operate the UC Theater as live music venue. It reopened its doors on April 7, 2016.

== History ==
Opened on June 30, 1917, as a first run theater, the 1,466-seat theater was initially owned by Luther H. Williamson and Richard H. Bradshaw and managed by Albert H. Moore and John P. Dean. The auditorium measured 150 by 91 feet (46 by 28 m) and was billed as "comfortably [seating] 2,000 persons." The theater was named after, but had no relation to, the nearby University of California, Berkeley. It was housed in a mixed-use building which included commercial (retail) and second-floor office spaces; the offices were converted to rental lodging in 1942 by Luther Williamson's son and were renamed the Stark Hotel until it was shut down in the 1980s for code violations. The theater was subsequently acquired by Twentieth Century Fox as part of their West Coast Theatres chain in 1924, and became part of the National Theatres chain after Fox West Coast went bankrupt in 1933. In the 1940s, the UC was gutted by a fire and the interior decor was never fully restored.

=== Arthouse/Grindhouse (1974–2001) ===
The UC was acquired in 1974 by Gary Meyer, who joined the Landmark Theatres chain in 1976, bringing the UC with him; Landmark was initially founded in 1974 by Steve Gilula and Kim Jorgensen to run the 550-seat Nuart Theatre in Los Angeles, and Meyer was responsible for programming the UC. The theater under Meyer showed older films, in double or triple features, generally for a single night, but sometimes for a week at a time. The UC started its daily rotation with two features (Day for Night, by Truffaut and 8½, by Fellini) on April 1, 1976, just 48 hours after its last shows as a first-run movie theater.

Along with the Rialto, Telegraph and Northside theaters in Berkeley, it was one of the main venues in the East Bay for showing both domestic and foreign film classics. The UC would show films from Hong Kong every Thursday over a five-year run, ending in 1998 after Miramax tied up the distribution rights to films featuring Jackie Chan and Jet Li.

=== Closing ===
The building was acquired by new owners in 1999 and Landmark negotiated a $3,000-per-month lease to continue in the space. According to the new owners, Landmark later requested a reduction in rent to $1,500 per month and asked to make the property owners responsible for the entire cost of seismic retrofits. The theater closed in March 2001 after Landmark—now owned by Silver Cinemas, Inc.—decided to pull out of the space rather than spend its half of the $500,000 needed for seismic upgrades required for the unreinforced masonry building in the wake of the 1989 Loma Prieta earthquake (the UC was designed and built in 1916–17, preceding the 1933 California ban on unreinforced masonry buildings). The UC had been "marginally profitable" prior to its closure due to low attendance, and the theater had switched to weeklong runs rather than daily rotations in the fall of 2000.

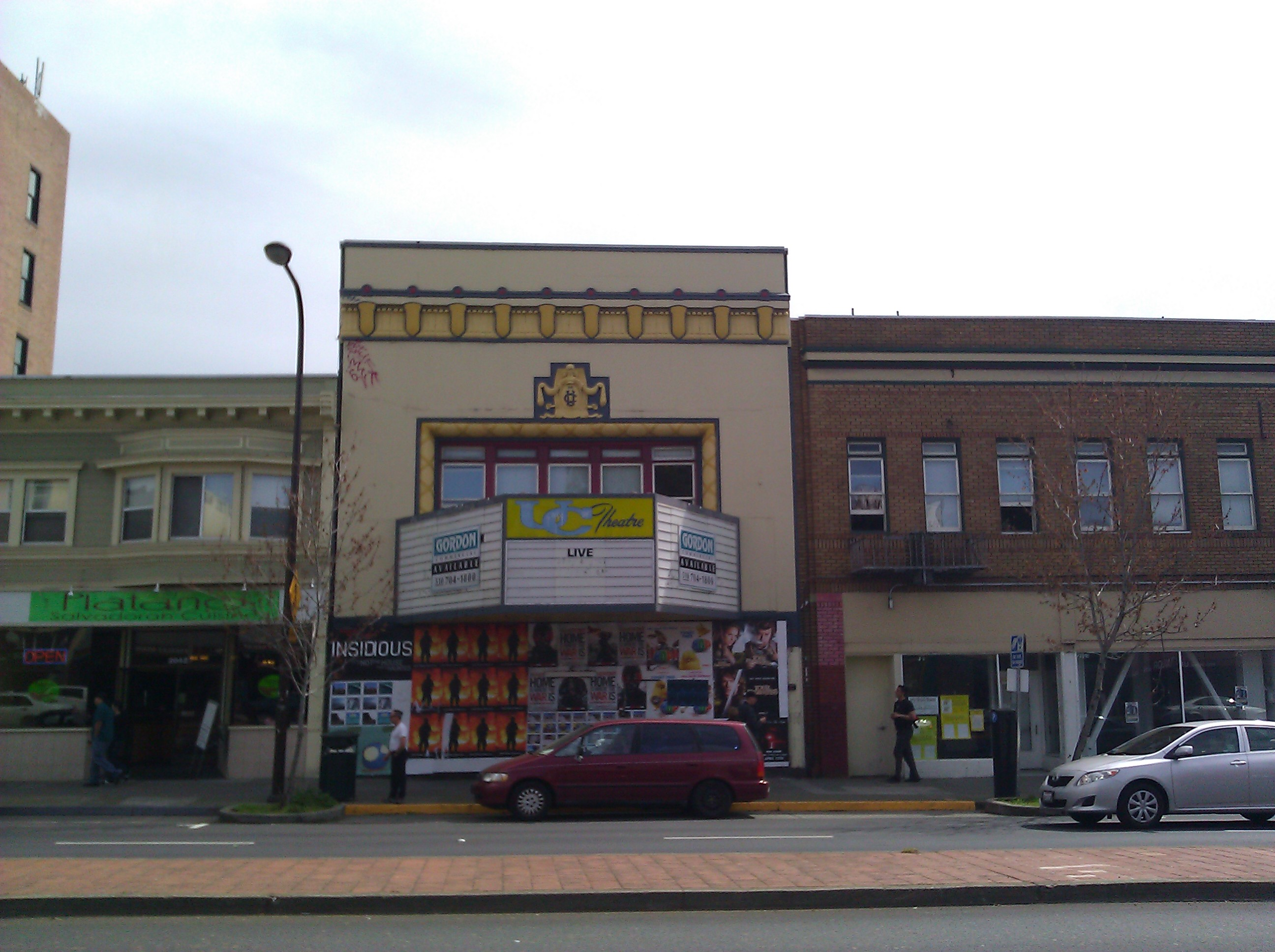
Vacant UC Theatre in 2011

One year after closing, the UC hosted a production of Medea by Euripides from April through June 2002. The production company, the Shotgun Players, were allowed to play rent-free in exchange for bringing the building up to city codes. The theater was named a landmark by the City of Berkeley on 6 May 2002. In early 2006, plans to convert the theater to a jazz club were submitted to the City of Berkeley.

=== Music venue (2016–) ===
Another plan to convert it into a live music venue was proposed in 2009. David Mayeri and partners purchased the building and raved the UC "has great sight lines, great bones. It could fill the niche The Fillmore fills in San Francisco." In 2014, a $5 million conversion proposal was announced. The conversion was led by the Berkeley Music Group, a non-profit organization headed by Mayeri, and would result in accommodations for 800 to 1,400 patrons in front of an expanded stage, and a new restaurant and bar. The rebuild commenced on March 18, 2015, with plans to have the renovated UC open by the end of 2015. The venue was officially renamed the UC Theatre Taube Family Music Hall after a major donor.

The first show in the revamped UC was scheduled for March 1, 2016, featuring Best Coast and Wavves, but it was moved to The Fillmore after construction delays. They Might Be Giants were then scheduled as the first act to play on Friday, March 25, 2016, but that show had to be canceled due to technical issues. Instead, Trombone Shorty was scheduled to open the venue the next night, on Saturday, March 26, but his show was also canceled amid technical issues. The theatre finally reopened its doors on April 7, 2016, with Dark Star Orchestra as a long-awaited opening act that night. The renovation ran $600,000 over the $5.5 million budget. Since then, the venue has been busy, including a sold-out show by local pop-punk band Green Day in October 2016.

== Cultural events ==
The theater was the site of the premiere of Errol Morris' first film Gates of Heaven (1978), an event at which filmmaker Werner Herzog ate his shoe before the audience in fulfillment of a bet made with Morris. This event was recorded in the documentary Werner Herzog Eats His Shoe (1980) by local filmmaker Les Blank. In 1984, Cicely Tyson spoke at an event in her honor at the theater that was hosted by Northern California Women in Film and TV. In an interview, Tom Hanks mentioned that the theater was one of the things that spurred his interest in film. Linwood Dunn gave a talk on the special effects behind King Kong for a showing of the film. A live orchestra would play for select silent films.

It was locally famous for its late-night showings of the cult film Rocky Horror Picture Show (1975), over a 22-year run which ended in January 1999. The ongoing audience participation group, which eventually went on to recreate the film live on stage at the theater under the name Indecent Exposure, was one of the earliest, and best well known, of such groups until October 1995, when they disbanded. In 1990, Indecent Exposure was filmed on a Los Angeles soundstage for scenes released with the Rocky Horror home video. Seamlessly, a new group named Barely Legal took over and is still performing Rocky Horror to this day, switching venues to the Parkway Cinema in Oakland from 1999 to 2009, and then touring various venues in northern California before settling at the Albany Twin and Camera 3.
