= Berkeley Music Group =

American non-profit organization

The Berkeley Music Group is a 501(c)(3) non-profit based in Berkeley, California. It was formed in 2012 by David Mayeri, who was formerly chief operating officer of Bill Graham Presents to renovate the UC Theatre. The UC Theatre was a movie theatre from its opening in 1917 to its closing in 2001. The Berkeley Music Group reopened the theatre in Spring 2016 as a music venue, and will present between 75-100 shows per year, in a wide variety of genres. Berkeley Music Group raised $5.6 million through private donations and grants, with Taube Philanthropies giving them a $1.3 million matching grant. After the grant, the theatre was renamed The UC Theatre Taube Family Music Hall.

They also plan to operate The Berkeley Music Group Educational Programs, which will offer workshops and internship programs for local youth, aged 17–25.
