= Cambon letter =

1917 Zionist document

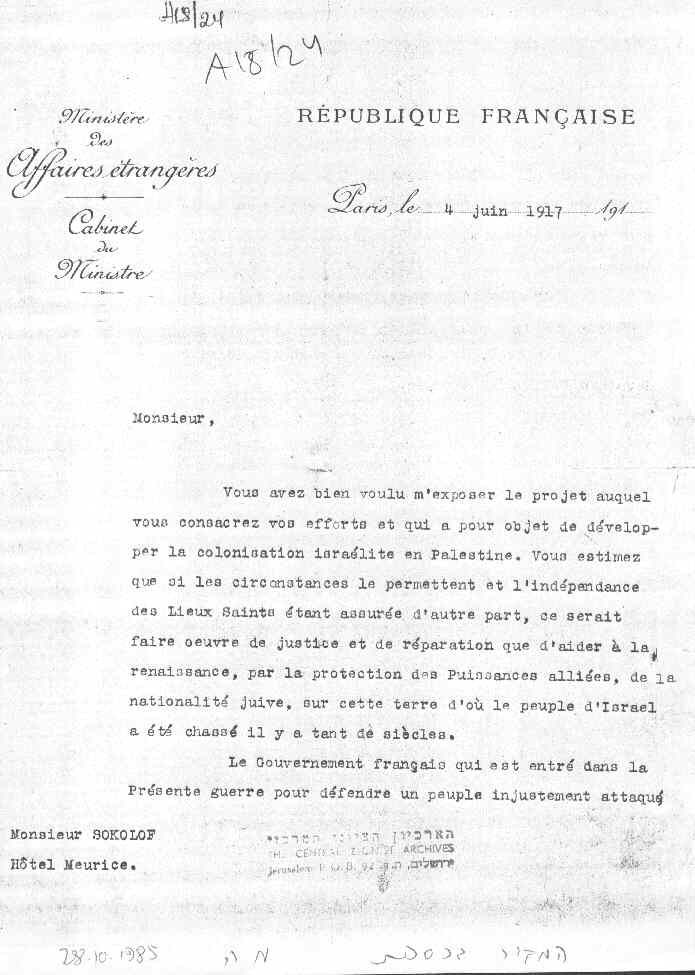
The Cambon Letter (first page)

The Cambon letter was an unpublished letter by French diplomat Jules Cambon to Zionist diplomat Nahum Sokolow. It was issued by the French government in June 1917 during the First World War, announcing support for the Zionist project in Palestine, then an Ottoman region with a small minority Jewish population. It read:

You were good enough to present the project to which you are devoting your efforts, which has for its object the development of Jewish colonization in Palestine.You consider that, circumstances permitting, and the independence of the Holy Places being safeguarded on the other hand, it would be a deed of justice and of reparation to assist, by the protection of the Allied Powers, in the renaissance of the Jewish nationality in that Land from which the people of Israel were exiled so many centuries ago.
The French Government, which entered this present war to defend a people wrongfully attacked, and which continues the struggle to assure the victory of right over might, can but feel sympathy for your cause, the triumph of which is bound up with that of the Allies.

I am happy to give you herewith such assurance.

It has been argued that the letter was a necessary precondition of the Balfour Declaration.

== History ==
On 11 March 1916, in a telegram to the Russian and French ambassadors, Edward Grey put forward a proposal that the Allies together issue a public declaration supporting Jewish aspirations in Palestine. Verete, in his account of the developments leading up to this proposal, explains, "here is the root and source of the pro-Zionist policy of British governments until the Balfour Declaration"

Historian Martin Kramer argues that securing the assent of Britain's French and American Allies, and of the Vatican, which controlled many Christian Holy Sites in the Land of Israel, was a necessary precondition for the Balfour Declaration.

Both British diplomat Mark Sykes and French diplomat François Georges-Picot were in Petrograd at the time advising their ambassadors in the matter of securing Russian assent to the secret Sykes-Picot Agreement and its terms in regard to a future disposition of Palestine. There was little enthusiasm for the proposal on the part of either the French or the Russians. Brecher gives an account of French motivations and attitude to the question during the war years.

There were few developments until the change of government in Britain although the need for accommodation with the French, intent on sticking by the terms of Sykes-Picot, remained. In a memorandum dated 21 April 1917, Lord Robert Cecil, who was deputizing for Arthur Balfour as Foreign Secretary during the Balfour Mission to America, wrote that:

I quite recognise the very great difficult of carrying out the Zionist policy involving as it does a strong preference for a British protectorate over Palestine. That seems to me to make it the more desirable to get France to join us in an expression of sympathy for Jewish Nationalist aspirations.

A trip to France and Italy had been organized for Mark Sykes, who had been appointed earlier in the year to lead negotiations with the Zionists, and Zionist diplomat Nahum Sokolow, during April and May 1917. They secured the assent of Pope Benedict XV on 4 May 1917. Having met various French officials in April, they visited Italy and Sokolow secured the verbal support of Pope Benedict XV on 4 May 1917. On his return to France, Sokolow was able to obtain the Cambon letter from the French commitment in written form, although it remained unpublished at the time. The letter was apparently submitted to Ronald Graham by Sokolow; Picot was asked to come over to London by end of October to appear at a Cabinet meeting and explain the French position in relation to the Zionist movement. Kaufman cites Stein as considering it feasible the possibility that the document was not brought to the attention of Lord Balfour or that he forgot about its existence and also cites Verete as believing the document probably lost.

Kramer gives more information as well as an analysis of the background and motivations for the Cambon letter and the post-Balfour Declaration endorsement by Pichon.
