= Vlado Dapčević =

Montenegrin politician (1917–2001)

Personal details
- Born: Vladimir Dapčević; 14 June 1917 Ljubotinj, Montenegro (now Cetinje, Montenegro)
- Died: 12 July 2001 (aged 84) Brussels, Belgium
- Party: Communist Party of Yugoslavia (1933–1952); Party of Labour (1991–2001)
- Spouse: Micheline Dapčević
- Children: Milena Dapčević
- Awards: Order of Bravery; Medal of the Partisans - 1941

Military service
- Allegiance: Yugoslav Partisans
- Rank: Colonel
- Unit: 1st Proletarian Brigade
- Battles/wars: Uprising in Montenegro; Battle of Pljevlja; Battle of Neretva; Battle of Sutjeska

Vladimir "Vlado" Dapčević (Serbian Cyrillic: Владимир "Владo" Дапчевић; 14 June 1917 – 12 July 2001) was a Yugoslav and Montenegrin communist, revolutionary and political leader who fought as a Partisan against Axis occupation troops and forces of the Independent State of Croatia during World War II. He was a political dissident and after the war he opposed the Anti-Soviet policy of Josip Broz Tito, president of Yugoslavia. He spent a total of 24 years in Yugoslav prisons as a political dissident for advocating anti-Titoism and Proletarian internationalism. After the collapse of Yugoslavia in 1990s, he founded the Party of Labour in Serbia.

He criticised Tito, as well as Soviet leaders Nikita Khrushchev and Leonid Brezhnev, for departing from Marxism–Leninism. He accused them for leaning towards capitalism and the latter two for exposing the Soviet Union to the collapse. He was the younger brother of famous Montenegrin communist military leader Peko Dapčević.

== Early life ==
Dapčević was born 1917 in the village Ljubotinj in the Kingdom of Montenegro, he attended secondary school in Cetinje where he was expelled because of organizing a student strike.

At 16, in 1933, he became a member of the Alliance of Communist Youth of Yugoslavia (SKOJ). That very same year he was arrested for the first time due to taking part in distribution of communist leaflets. He was accepted into Communist Party of Yugoslavia (KPJ) in 1934.

In Cetinje, 1935, during Party demonstrations and clash with the police he was arrested and brutally beaten. He spent a month in jail, after which he continued his education in Podgorica, Nikšić, and Prizren. He was eventually expelled from all these schools.

Because of a break within KPJ in 1936 and the following mass arrests of Party members, the Party in Montenegro organized (dangerous) manifestations causing clashes with the police. Dapčević was arrested and spent four months in the Sarajevo jail.

In 1937, he was promoted to the post of Organizing Party Secretary in Cetinje. At the same time he signed up as a volunteer in the Spanish Civil War, on the Republican side. But police discovered the plot and arrested a large group of volunteers, including Dapčević.

After his release in 1939, the authorities allowed him to graduate from secondary school in Kotor, and he was accepted for studies at the School of Chemical Engineering in Belgrade. At Belgrade University he took a part in struggles for University autonomy from the Royal Government. In a clash with pro-royalist youths he gained a serious head injury.

During 1940, he went on a Party assignment to Boka Kotorska in Montenegro, where he worked on organizing Party cells. But the local KPJ committee dissolved due to internal misunderstandings and Dapčević headed back to Belgrade.

== World War II ==
Dapčević was living in Belgrade when, on April 6, 1941, the Luftwaffe unleashed a savage bombing of the city. As Yugoslavia surrendered to Nazi Germany, Dapčević moved from Belgrade back to Montenegro where he was active in the organization of resistance. However, shortly after a rebellion attack in Čevo on July 13, 1941, he was expelled from the Party. As a fighter of the Lovćen Battalion, he took part in the assault on Pljevlja, in which he was wounded, and he also played a part in the founding of the First Proletarian Brigade in Rudo, and crossed Mount Igman at Sarajevo.

He was re-admitted into the Party in Foča in early 1942, and designated political Commissar for the Drina Volunteer (Partisan) Detachment. By mid-1942, he was promoted to commander of the First Detachment of the Lovćen Battalion. However, due to his continued criticism of the Party, he was once again expelled. As a commander of a bombing squad, he took part in many actions until he was, once again, wounded at the end of 1942. He also took part in battles on Neretva and Sutjeska. After these, he was again re-admitted into the Party and assigned as the party for the Seventh Krajina Brigade.

During the first half of 1944, he was promoted to the Headquarters Officer School, and then to Commissar of the Tenth Division of NOVJ. When the war ended, he held the rank of a lieutenant colonel in the Yugoslav People's Army. After the war, he worked as a professor at the Party School for Officers, and in 1947, he was promoted to JNA Chief of Administration for Agitation and Propaganda (Agitprop).

== After the war ==
In 1948, he attended the Fifth Party Congress. However, as he was in favor of the resolutions of the Information Bureau, he was forced to flee the country. He attempted to leave Yugoslavia together with his companion Arso Jovanović, an army general and the chief of army headquarters. They tried to cross the border with Romania but were stopped by the border guards. In the skirmish, Jovanović was shot to death, while Dapčević escaped unscathed and spent the following months in hiding in Belgrade. In the fall of 1948, he attempted to escape to Hungary, but was arrested and kept in custody for a total of 22 months before finally receiving a 20-year jail sentence.

From June 1950 to December 6, 1956, he was imprisoned in concentration camps at Stara Gradiška, Bileća and Goli Otok, and each time exposed to brutal torture.

After his early release and due to the threat of re-arrest, he escaped to Albania in 1958 with a group of comrades. After a couple of months, they traveled to and settled in the USSR.

Upon arrival in the USSR, he was offered to continue with his education or accept a corresponding job. He refused this offer and continued with his political work. During 1961, he organized strong propaganda for the Conference of Communist Parties in Moscow. As a result, thanks in part to his activity, the Conference adopted the resolution of condemnation of the Yugoslav Communist Alliance (SKJ) as a revisionist and an Anti-Marxist party.

During the Cuban Missile Crisis, Dapčević and other émigrés organized volunteer groups to Cuba, but were prevented from departing by the Soviet authorities.

Between 1964 and 1965, Dapčević lived in Odessa where he worked on a doctoral dissertation on the Yugoslav workers movement. In early 1965, he wanted to join the communist forces fighting the Vietnam War as a volunteer, but was still not allowed to leave the Soviet Union.

He finally left the Soviet Union in 1966, by illegally emigrating to Western Europe. He lived in France, Switzerland and the Netherlands, where he mostly worked as a physical laborer. He strove to develop political dissent among the Yugoslav economic emigration (gastarbeiters), but with little result. He was arrested several times and deported from each of the three countries he had been staying in. In 1969, he managed to obtain permanent residence in Belgium. In Brussels, he married a Belgian citizen and lived in Ixelles near the Brussels university ULB. In 1975 even became a Belgian citizen himself. While there, he kept in touch with West European Marxist–Leninist groups and took part in their activities. In 1973, he survived an assassination attempt by UDBA.

In 1975, the Romanian and Yugoslav secret services organized Dapčević's kidnapping while he was visiting Bucharest, after which he was extradited to Yugoslavia. He had been sentenced to death in absentia, but the punishment was commuted to 20 years of hard labor (this leniency was shown to him as his brother Peko Dapčević was a renowned army general and World War II hero). He was released from the Požarevac prison in 1988, and promptly expelled from Yugoslavia.

Dapčević was allowed to return to Yugoslavia in September 1990, in the midst of political turmoil. In his many interviews and public appearances he indicated there was an imminent danger of civil war and dissolution of Yugoslavia.

On March 27, 1992, he founded the Party of Labour and during the civil war in the former Yugoslavia, he actively worked on the strengthening of democracy and unity against the Milošević government.

Between 1992 and 1996, he attended Marxist–Leninist party conferences and meetings. In 1997, at the first Party of Labour congress, Dapčević set the party program and political aims, laying foundations for a real revolutionary party in Yugoslavia.

Dapčević continued with political activities until his death on July 12, 2001. He was a strong advocate of an independent Montenegro.

== See also ==
- Informbiro
- Yugoslav Partisans
- Peko Dapčević
- Arso Jovanović
