= Nahum Sokolow =

Hebrew journalist, editor, essayist, and political leader (1859–1936)

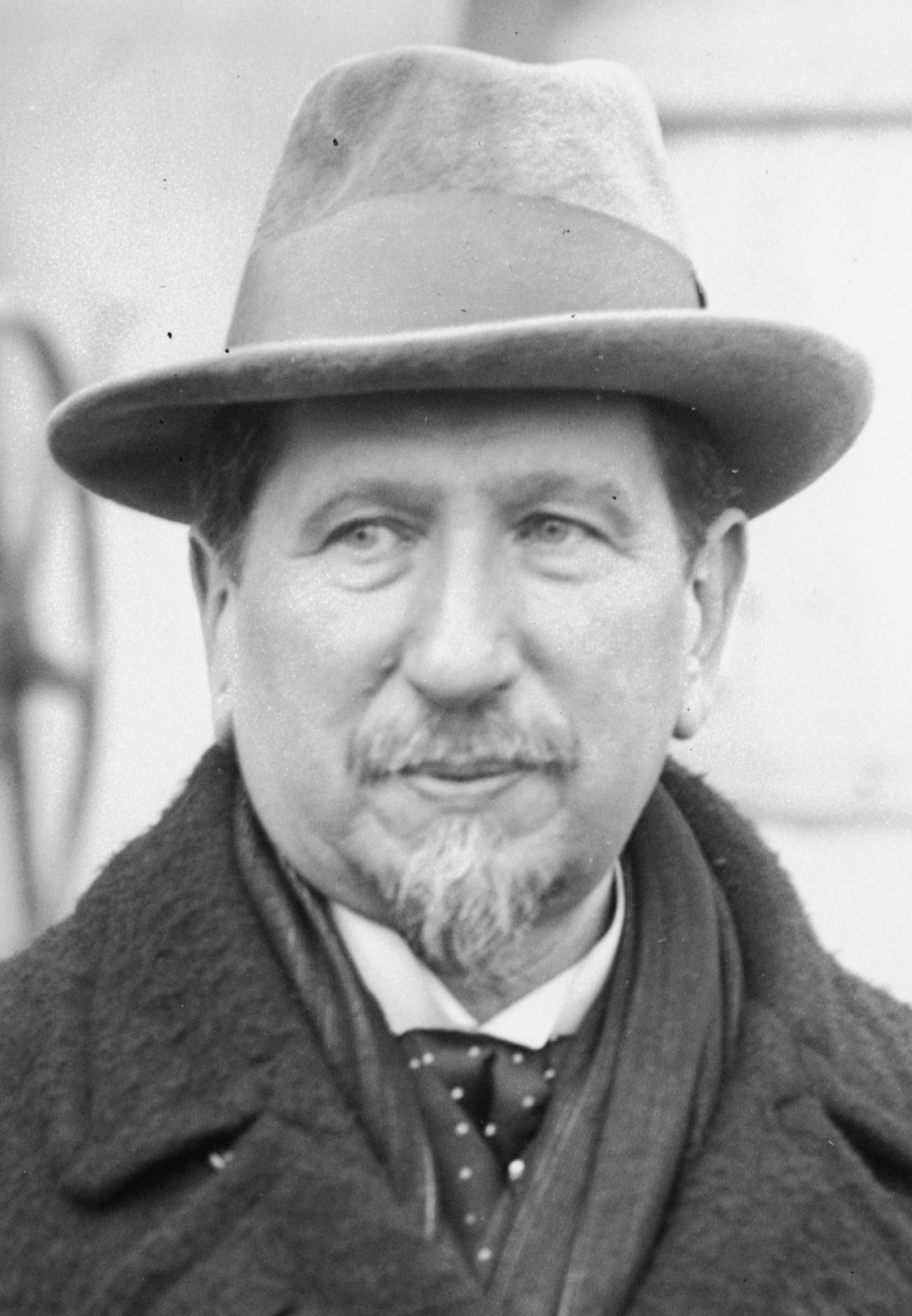

President of the World Zionist Organization
- In office 1931–1935
- Preceded by: Chaim Weizmann
- Succeeded by: Chaim Weizmann

Personal details
- Born: 10 January 1859 Wyszogród, Płock Governorate, Congress Poland, Russian Empire
- Died: 17 May 1936 (aged 77) London, England
- Resting place: Mount Herzl, Jerusalem

Nahum ben Joseph Samuel Sokolow (Hebrew: נחום ט'סוקולוב Nachum ben Yosef Shmuel Soqolov, Yiddish: סאָקאָלאָוו; 10 January 1859 – 17 May 1936) was a Jewish-Polish writer, translator, and journalist, the fifth President of the World Zionist Organization, editor of Ha-Tsfira, researcher, Zionist leader and statesman.

== Biography ==
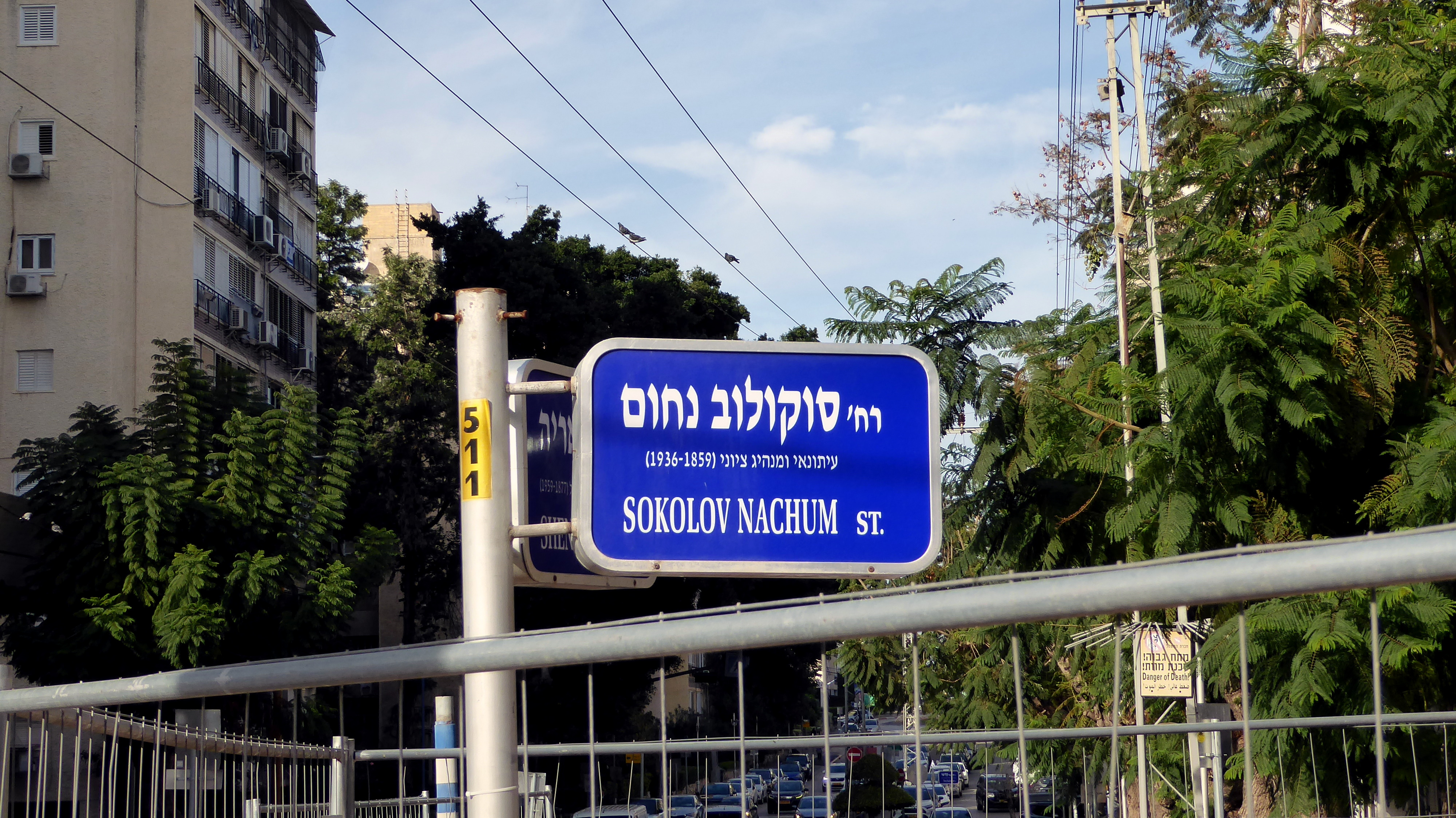
Nahum Sokolow Street in Holon

Sokolow was born in 1859 in the shtetl of Wyszogród near Płock in the Russian Empire (today in Poland) to a rabbinic family. His father, a descendant of Rabbi Nathan Nata Spira ("Megaleh Amukot"), moved to Płock in 1865. Sokolow studied in the study houses of Wyszogród, Płock, Lowicz, Sompolno, Koło, Kutno, and others. A polyglot, he studied foreign languages from a young age, becoming fluent in Russian, German, English, French, and Italian literature. His father wanted him to study for the rabbinate but with the intervention of Baron Wrangel, the governor of Płock, he enrolled in a secular school. He married at eighteen and settled in Makov, where his father-in-law lived, and earned a living as a wool merchant. In 1883, upon arriving in Warsaw, he pursued broad general studies. In 1884, he began writing for the Hebrew newspaper Ha-Tsfira, later becoming its editor and owner. The paper appealed to both enlightened Jews and the Haredim.

In 1884 (Hebrew year 5645), he founded the annual literary almanac HaAsif, which was published until 1889, with a final volume appearing in 1894. He later published Sefer HaShanah ("The Yearbook") in Warsaw between 1899 and 1902, considered a continuation of HaAsif. In 1889, he also edited Sefer Zikaron le-Sofrei Yisrael HaChayim Ittanu Hayom – a biographical collection of contemporary Jewish authors, as an appendix to HaAsif. He was a prominent contributor to the periodical Ivri Anochi.

In 1914, after the outbreak of World War I, he moved to London to work with Chaim Weizmann.

Sokolow is regarded as the father of modern Hebrew journalism. He established European standards for Hebrew press, emphasizing factual, up-to-date, and accurate reporting. He pioneered the Hebrew reportage (news article) style, developed a unique linguistic register blending layers of Hebrew with his own neologisms for foreign words. He introduced the Yiddish feuilleton genre to Hebrew, pioneered travel writing, and was the first Hebrew journalist to include a regular weekly literary supplement. He also formulated an early concept of journalistic ethics centered on truth and accuracy, avoiding sensationalism.

David Lazar wrote of Sokolow:

Our prosaic and cynical generation can no longer comprehend the reverence that bordered on worship that surrounded Nahum Sokolow, 'HaOreach LeShabbat' – as he signed his feuilletons in Ha-Tsfira. People didn't merely read him – they 'studied' his words as if they were a page of Talmud.

Initially, Sokolow opposed Theodor Herzl’s idea of establishing a Jewish state in Eretz Israel, believing it could harm the moshavot. However, within a year, he became an ardent supporter. In 1897, he covered the First Zionist Congress as a journalist. Around 1900, Herzl sent him to meet the Rebbe of Ger, one of Poland's leading rabbis, in an effort to win him over to Zionism – the meeting was unsuccessful.

== Zionist activism ==
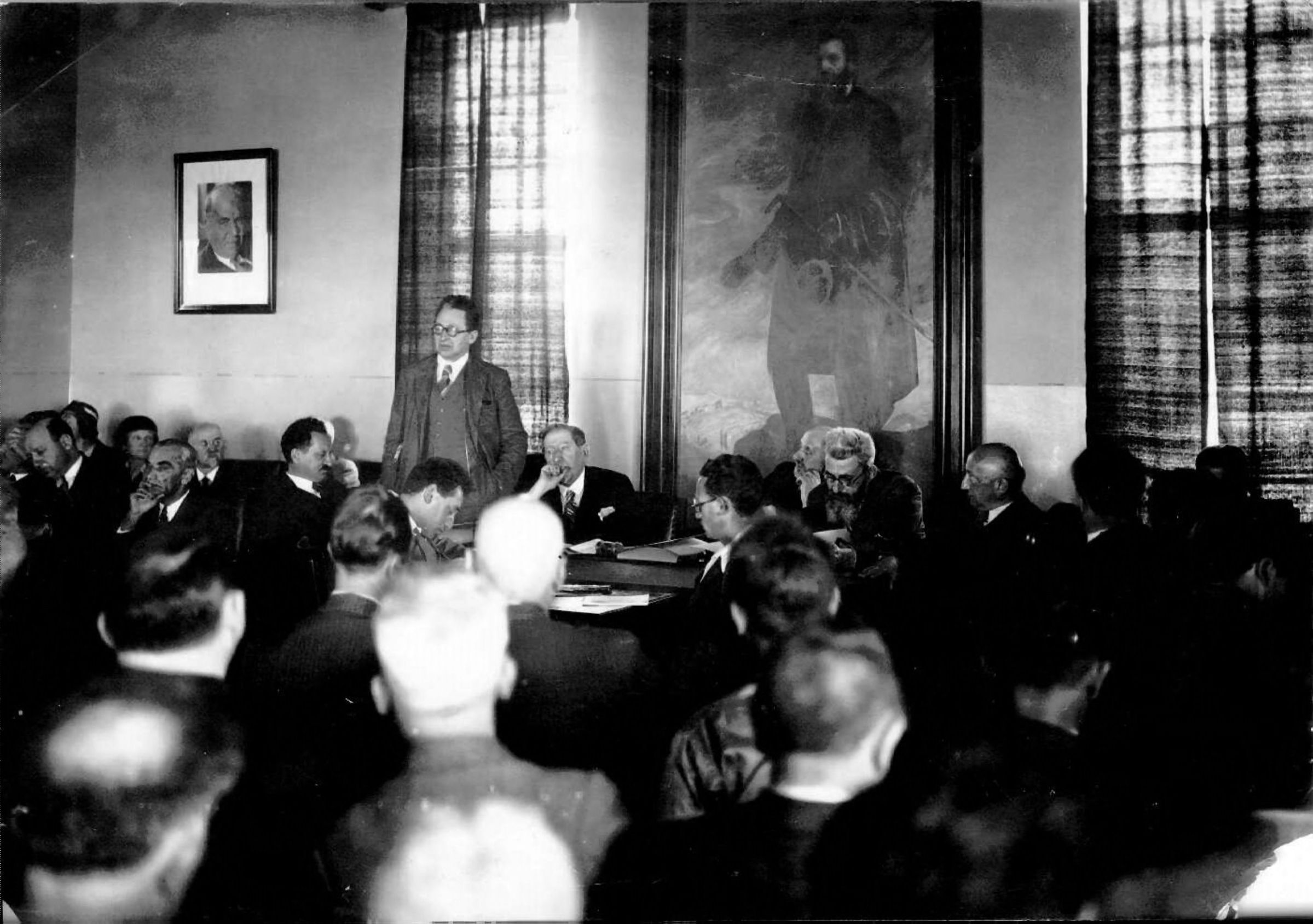
Yitzhak Ben-Zvi addresses Zionist General Council meeting in Jerusalem, 1935. From right to left: I. Rupaisen, Ben-Zion Mossinson, H. Farbstein, Nahum Sokolow, Yitzhak Ben-Zvi, Yosef Sprinzak, I. L. Goldberg, Shmaryahu Levin, Eliezer Kaplan.

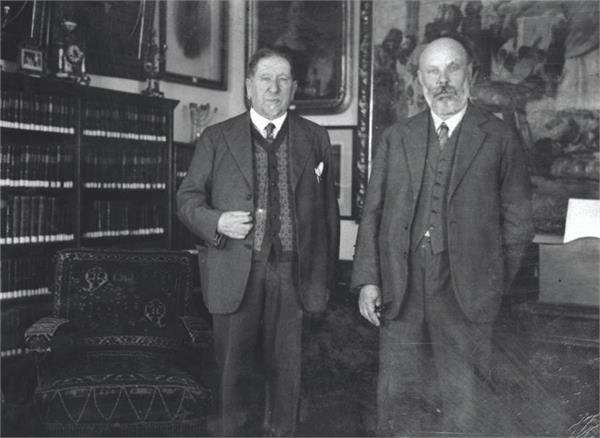
Sokolow with Menachem Ussishkin, Jerusalem, 1930

In 1902, Sokolow translated Herzl’s Altneuland into Hebrew, coining the name Tel Aviv (later adopted as the name of the first Hebrew city). He explained the name as a combination of "Tel" (an ancient ruin) and "Aviv" (spring, renewal).

In 1906, After Herzl's death, Sokolow was asked to become the secretary general of the World Zionist Congress. In the ensuing years, he crisscrossed Europe and North America to promote the Zionist cause. After moving to London, he was a leading advocate for the Balfour Declaration in which the British government declared its support for a Jewish homeland in Palestine. In 1906, he became editor of the Zionist organization's central German publication Die Welt. In 1908, he founded the Hebrew weekly Ha-Olam. In 1910, he resigned from all his positions due to internal Zionist disputes.

In 1911, the 10th Zionist Congress elected him to the Zionist Executive, where he handled diplomatic matters. Unlike others, Sokolow remained close to Orthodox Judaism and studied Talmud daily. He negotiated with France, securing the Cambon Declaration in support of Jewish settlement in Palestine. Alongside Chaim Weizmann, he was instrumental in securing the Balfour Declaration. That same year, his masterpiece Ishim ("Figures") was published – a collection of portraits of influential Jews. In 1919, his monumental two-volume history, History of Zionism, was published in English.

On 6 February 1917, a meeting was held in Maida Vale with Weizmann to discuss the results of the Picot convention in Paris. Following their displacement of Gaster from leadership, Sokolow and Weizmann continued their efforts and received official recognition from the British government.

Historian Martin Kramer argues that securing the assent of Britain's French and American allies, as well as that of the Vatican—which controlled many Christian holy sites in the Land of Israel—was a necessary precondition for the Balfour Declaration. On 4 May 1917, Sokolow obtained the support of Pope Benedict XV, who described the return of the Jews to Palestine as "providential; God has willed it". France's assent followed in the Cambon letter of 4 June 1917, signed by Jules Cambon, head of the French foreign ministry's political section.

At the same time, Chaim Weizmann corresponded with the Manchester Zionist Harry Sacher, who came to embody criticism that Sokolow and Weizmann had capitulated by "preferring British Imperialism... to Zionism". Acting as Weizmann's representative in Paris, Sokolow joined Sir Mark Sykes on a diplomatic mission to negotiate with the French. Unaware of the secret Sykes–Picot Agreement and wider Anglo-French understandings on Middle Eastern policy, Sokolow believed that France's reference to a "Greater Syria" implied a desire to claim all of Palestine. In a series of letters during April and May 1917, Weizmann accused him of failing the Zionists in these negotiations, while Sokolow countered that he remained entirely committed to a British-controlled Palestine.

The Zionist desiderata—the demands for their future homeland, included "communal autonomy, rights of language and establishment of a Jewish chartered company." Sokolow later reported diplomatic success in Paris, writing that the French had "accepted in principle the recognition of Jewish nationality in the capacity of National Home, local autonomy etc.—beyond my boldest expectations." These concessions were understood as a quid pro quo for Jewish support against Germany, an issue made more pressing by the United States’ entry into the war on 6 April 1917. Zionist aspirations became increasingly tied to an Allied victory, a phrase echoed by Sykes in his dispatches to Balfour.

The Paris conference ended on 9 April, marking a high point in Sokolow's career. The Zionists were now engaged in multiple diplomatic rounds. Sokolow subsequently traveled to Rome, where he sought support for a Jewish state in Palestine and met Monsignor Eugenio Pacelli, the future Pope Pius XII. The fact that Pope Benedict XV had strongly condemned antisemitism the previous year was regarded as a good omen.

In Rome, the Vatican considered accepting Zionist terms. Seeking guidance from Weizmann, Sokolow was astonished to secure an audience with the Pope on 6 May. He requested "moral support" and "philosophical equality," immediately reporting the "expression of favour" to Weizmann. Weizmann, adopting his characteristically pragmatic tone, congratulated Sokolow on the achievement without excessive enthusiasm. Shortly afterwards, Sokolow was summoned back to Paris by Jules Cambon and Prime Minister Alexandre Ribot, who remained concerned that Zionism might destabilize global security if it spread into Bolshevik Russia.

At the 12th Zionist Congress in 1921, Sokolow was elected Chair of the Zionist Executive, serving until the 17th Zionist Congress in 1931, when he became President of the World Zionist Organization. In 1935, he handed over leadership to Chaim Weizmann and was appointed Honorary President of the Zionist Organization, the Jewish Agency, and Keren Hayesod.

In 1931, Sokolow was elected President of the World Zionist Congress and served in that capacity until 1935, when he was succeeded by Chaim Weizmann. Sokolow also served as President of the Jewish Agency for Palestine (now called the Jewish Agency for Israel) between 1931 and 1933, when he was succeeded by Arthur Ruppin.

Sokolow died suddenly in London in 1936 at his desk. In 1956, his remains were reinterred in Israel at the Mount Herzl cemetery in Jerusalem, in the section for Zionist leaders and the Herzl family. His personal archive is preserved in the Central Zionist Archives.

Places named after him include Sde Nahum kibbutz, Beit Sokolow (House of Journalists) in Tel Aviv, which awards the annual Sokolow Prize for journalism, Gan-Nahum Gymnasium in Rishon LeZion, Hod HaSharon – Sokolov railway station, and numerous streets throughout Israel.

=== Family ===
At eighteen, Sokolow married Rivka, daughter of Rabbi Yitzhak Zvi Segal of the Makow family, who encouraged his intellectual pursuits. They had several children: daughters Maria, Helen, Sofia (Zusia), and Selina (Tselina); and sons Henry, Leon, and Florian. His daughter Maria married Stanisław Mendelson, founder of the Polish Socialist Party.

His daughter, Dr. Selina Sokolow, served as his secretary, later his physician, dedicating her life to him and to Zionism. Her nephew George, son of Florian, served as her aide until his death in 1967. Florian was killed in the London Blitz. Selina remained in London, never married, and had no children. In 1957, she attended the inauguration of Beit Sokolow in Tel Aviv.

== See also ==
- Sokolov Award

== Bibliography ==
=== Books ===
- Bauer, Ela (2005). Between Poles and Jews: The Development of Nahum Sokolow's Political Thought. Edited by Scott Ury. Jerusalem: Hebrew University Magnes Press.
- Dekel, E (2000). Shai: The Exploits of Hagana Intelligence. New York.
- Friedman, Isaiah (1977). Germany, Turkey and Zionism, 1897–1918. Oxford.
- Raisin, Max (1970). Great Jews I have known: a gallery of portraits. Ayer Publishing. ISBN 978-0-8369-8023-3.
- Sacher, Harry (1916). Zionism and the Jewish Future. London.
- Sokolow, Nahum (1919). History of Zionism: 1600–1918. Longmans, Green & Co., London.
- Sokolow, Florian (1975). Nahum Sokolow. London.
- Wolf, Lucien (1934). Essays in Jewish History (Cecil Roth ed.). London.

=== Articles ===
- Rawidowicz, S (May 1941). "Nahum Sokolow in Great Britain". New Judea.
- Wagner, S (August 2008). "British Intelligence and the Mandate of Palestine: Threats to British National Security Immediately after the Second World War". Intelligence and National Security. 23 (4): 435–462. doi:10.1080/02684520802293049. S2CID 154775965.
