= Party of Labour (Serbia) =

Political party in Serbia

Party of Labour Партија рада Partija rada
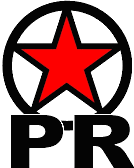
- Abbreviation: PR
- Leader: Collective leadership
- Founder: Vlado Dapčević
- Founded: 28 March 1992
- Headquarters: Belgrade
- Ideology: Communism; Marxism–Leninism
- Political position: Far-left
- International affiliation: ICMLPO (defunct); ICOR
- Colors: Red; Black
- Slogan: "Jedino revolucijom!" ("Only by revolution!")
- National Assembly: 0 / 250
- Assembly of Vojvodina: 0 / 120
- City Assembly of Belgrade: 0 / 110

Party flag

Website
- partijarada.org

Symbol of the Party of Labour

The Party of Labour (Serbian: Партиja рaдa, romanized: Partija rada, PR) is a Marxist–Leninist political party in Serbia.

== History ==
The party was founded in March 1992 by Vlado Dapčević, a Montenegrin anti-revisionist communist, who was a long-time political prisoner in the Socialist Federal Republic of Yugoslavia. Dapčević, a dissident during the one-party rule of the League of Communists of Yugoslavia, formed the party after the introduction of multi-party system. Party members were not allowed to take a part in wars in Croatia and Bosnia and Herzegovina. In September 1997 the Party program and Status were adopted, with a call to create a wide front and fight the regime. Activists took part in the overthrow of Slobodan Milošević. Dapčević died in 2001. The Second Party Congress was in July 2002. Party members took part in many protests over the years, including anti-NATO protests in Belgrade, along with other left-wing organizations. Party of Labour supported the independence of Montenegro.

In 2024, "Committee for the Reconstitution of the Communist Party of Yugoslavia" split from the party.

== Activities ==
While seeking revolution, its political activities are limited to organizing demonstrations and carrying out propaganda activities. The party is active in both Serbia and Montenegro. The party is a member of the International Coordination of Revolutionary Parties and Organizations.
