= May 1917 =

Month in 1917

<<	May 1917					>>
Su	Mo	Tu	We	Th	Fr	Sa
		1	2	3	4	5
6	7	8	9	10	11	12
13	14	15	16	17	18	19
20	21	22	23	24	25	26
27	28	29	30	31

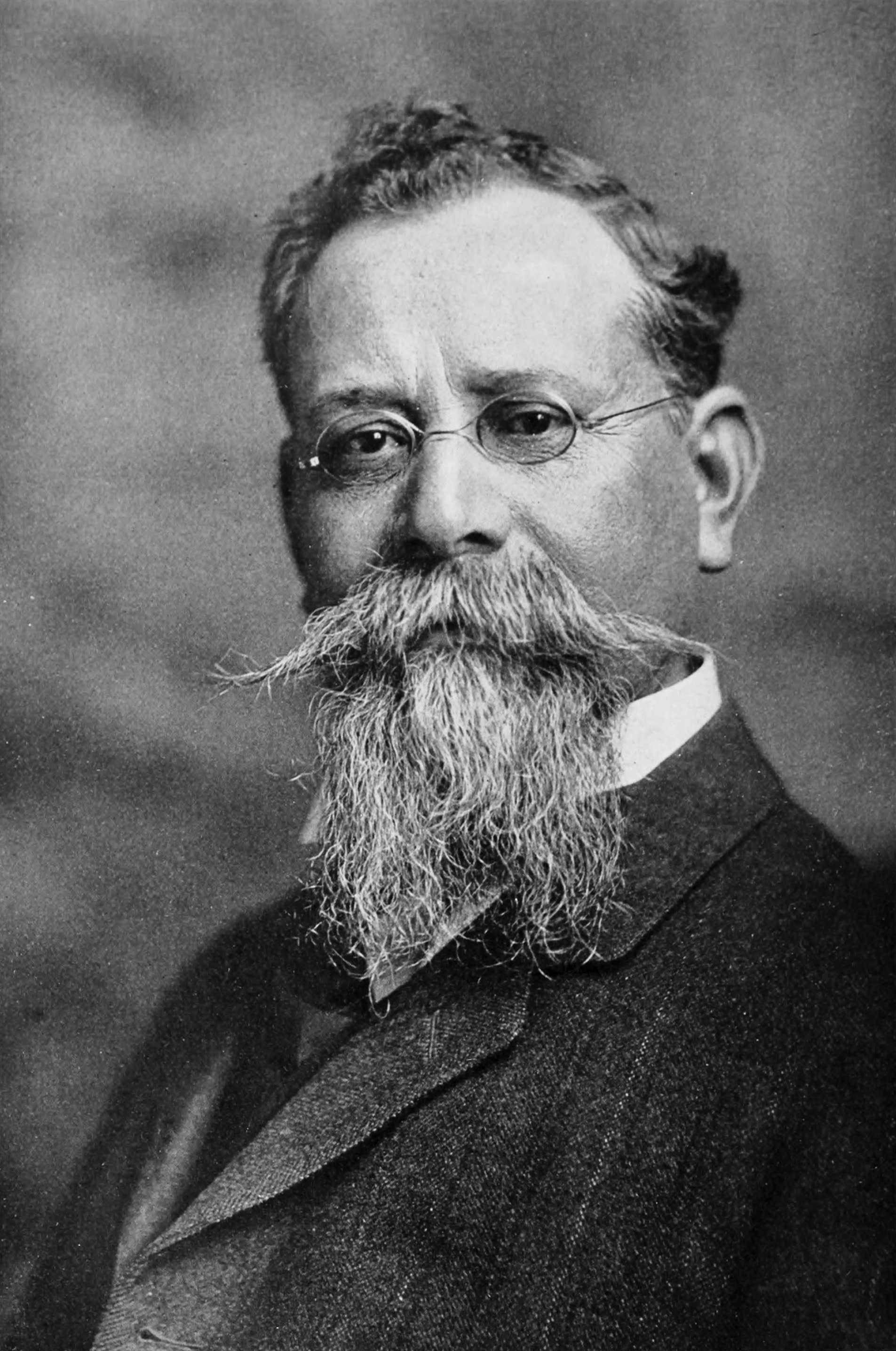
Venustiano Carranza becomes President of Mexico.

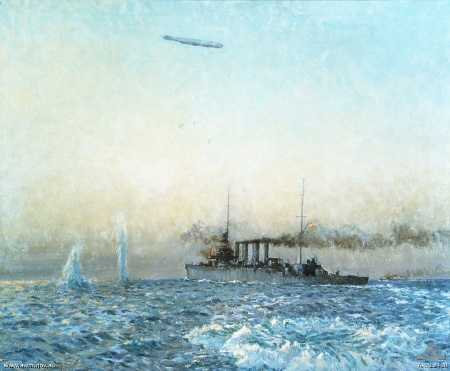
A painting of the engagement between Australian light cruiser HMAS Sydney and German Zeppelin LZ43 in the North Sea on 4 May 1917.

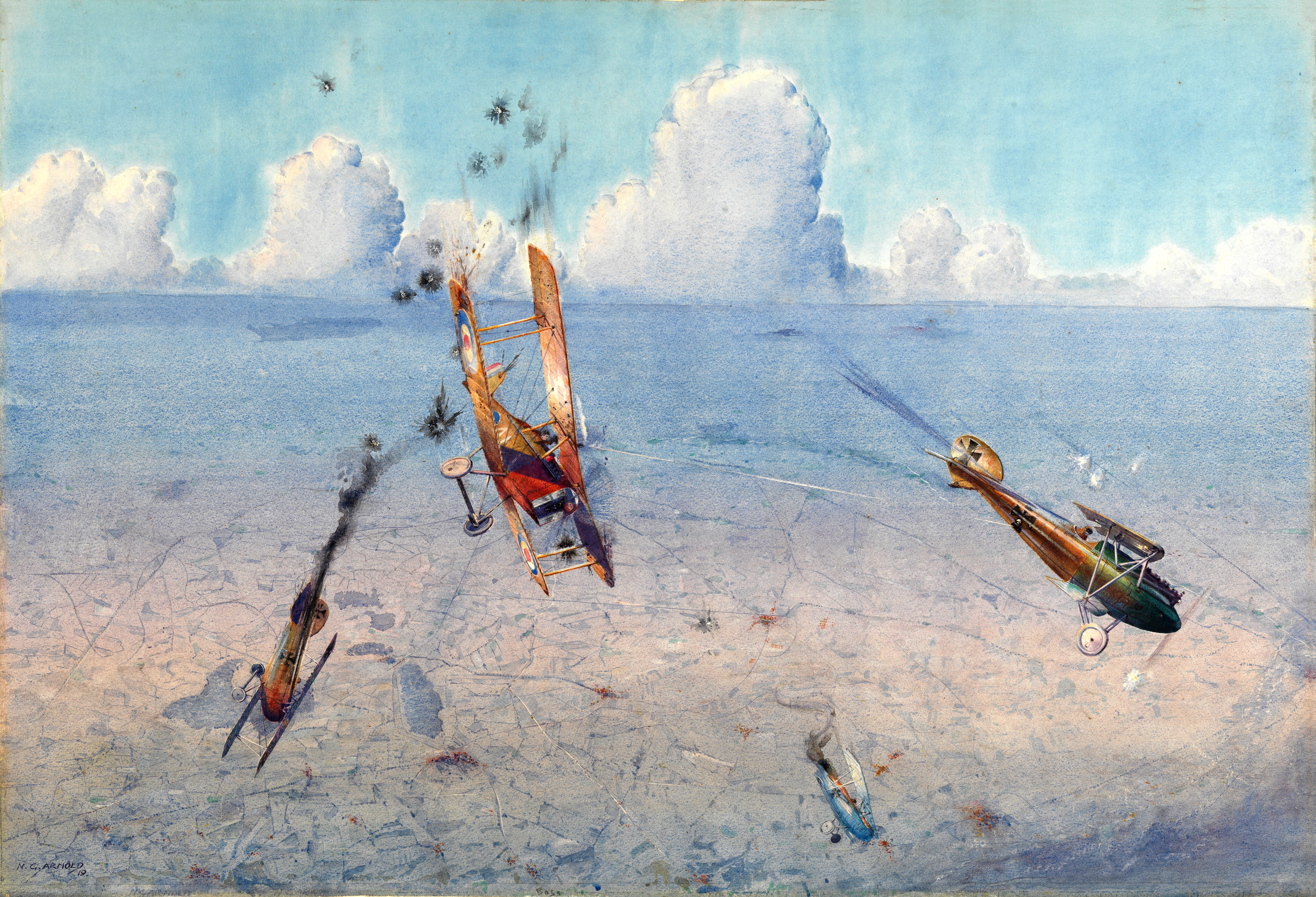
The Last Fight of Captain Albert Ball, VC, DSO and 2 Bars, MC, 7 May 1917 by Norman Arnold, 1919

The following events occurred in May 1917:

== May 1, 1917 (Tuesday) ==
- Venustiano Carranza was inaugurated as the 37th President of Mexico.
- Riots broke out in Milan and other towns in Lombardy, Italy.
- Over 100,000 anti-war protesters organized by the Bolsheviks gathered in Petrograd to oppose a pledge by Russian Provisional Government's Foreign Minister Pavel Milyukov for Russia to continue fighting against the Central Powers.
- Pope Benedict released a motu proprio (signed personal document) that led to the establishment of the Congregation for the Oriental Churches and the Pontifical Oriental Institute.
- Nayarit became one of the last territories to be admitted as a state in Mexico.
- German submarine SM U-81 was torpedoed and sunk with 31 crew lost in the Atlantic Ocean off the coast of Ireland.
- Imperial German Navy Zeppelins L 43 and L 45 conducted reconnaissance patrols over the North Sea off the coast of Scotland, patrolling off the Firth of Forth and Aberdeen respectively.
- Frederic T. Woodman was re-elected Mayor of Los Angeles, capturing half of the vote in the mayoral election.
- The New Zealand Rifle Brigade was formed as the 3rd Brigade of the New Zealand Division, part of the New Zealand Expeditionary Force.
- The Corpo Aeronautico Militare (Military Aviation Corps) of the Italian Army established air squadron 91a Squadriglia to support ground troops in the ongoing Battles of the Isonzo.
- The United States Army established the 24th Aero Squadron to assist the American Expeditionary Forces on the Western Front.
- Japanese sports equipment manufacturer Mikasa Sports was established in Hiroshima.
- Swiss weekly newspaper The New International published its first edition in Geneva. It ran until May 1, 1921, when it was replaced by the l'Avant-garde.
- English poet Marian Allen completed the poem "To A. T. G." a few days after hearing her fiancé Arthur Greg was killed in action, the first of several to his memory.
- The music school Tbilisi State Conservatoire was founded in Tbilisi, Georgia.
- The city of Elko, Nevada, was incorporated.
- The borough of Sea Girt, New Jersey, was incorporated.
- Born:
  - John Beradino, American baseball player and actor, second baseman for the Cleveland Indians during the 1948 World Series, also known for his role as Steve Hardy in the television soap opera General Hospital; as Giovanni Berardino, in Los Angeles, United States (d. 1996)
  - Ulric Cross, Trinidadian air force officer and judge, commander of the No. 139 Squadron for the Royal Air Force during World War II, recipient of the Distinguished Flying Cross, high court judge for Trinidad from 1971 to 2013; as Philip Louis Ulric Cross, in Port of Spain, Trinidad (d. 2013)
  - Danielle Darrieux, French singer and actress, known for award-winning roles including Scene of the Crime and 8 Women; in Bordeaux, France (d. 2017)
  - Fyodor Khitruk, Russian animator, best known for his animated films including The Story of a Crime; in Tver, Russian Empire (present-day Russia) (d. 2012)
- Died: William Knox D'Arcy, 67, British industrialist, principal architect of the oil and gas industry in Persia (now Iran) through the Anglo-Persian Oil Company (now BP) (b. 1849)

== May 2, 1917 (Wednesday) ==
- Royal Navy destroyer HMS Derwent struck a mine and sank off the coast of France, with the loss of 58 out of 70 crew.
- The People's Council of America for Democracy and the Terms of Peace was established in New York City in opposition to the United States entry into World War I.
- The Brazilian football association Federação de Futebol do Estado do Espírito Santo was established in Vitória, Espírito Santo, Brazil.
- Born: Juan Zurita, Mexican boxer, lightweight world champion in 1944; as Juan Bautista Zurita Ferre, in Veracruz, Mexico (d. 2000)

== May 3, 1917 (Thursday) ==
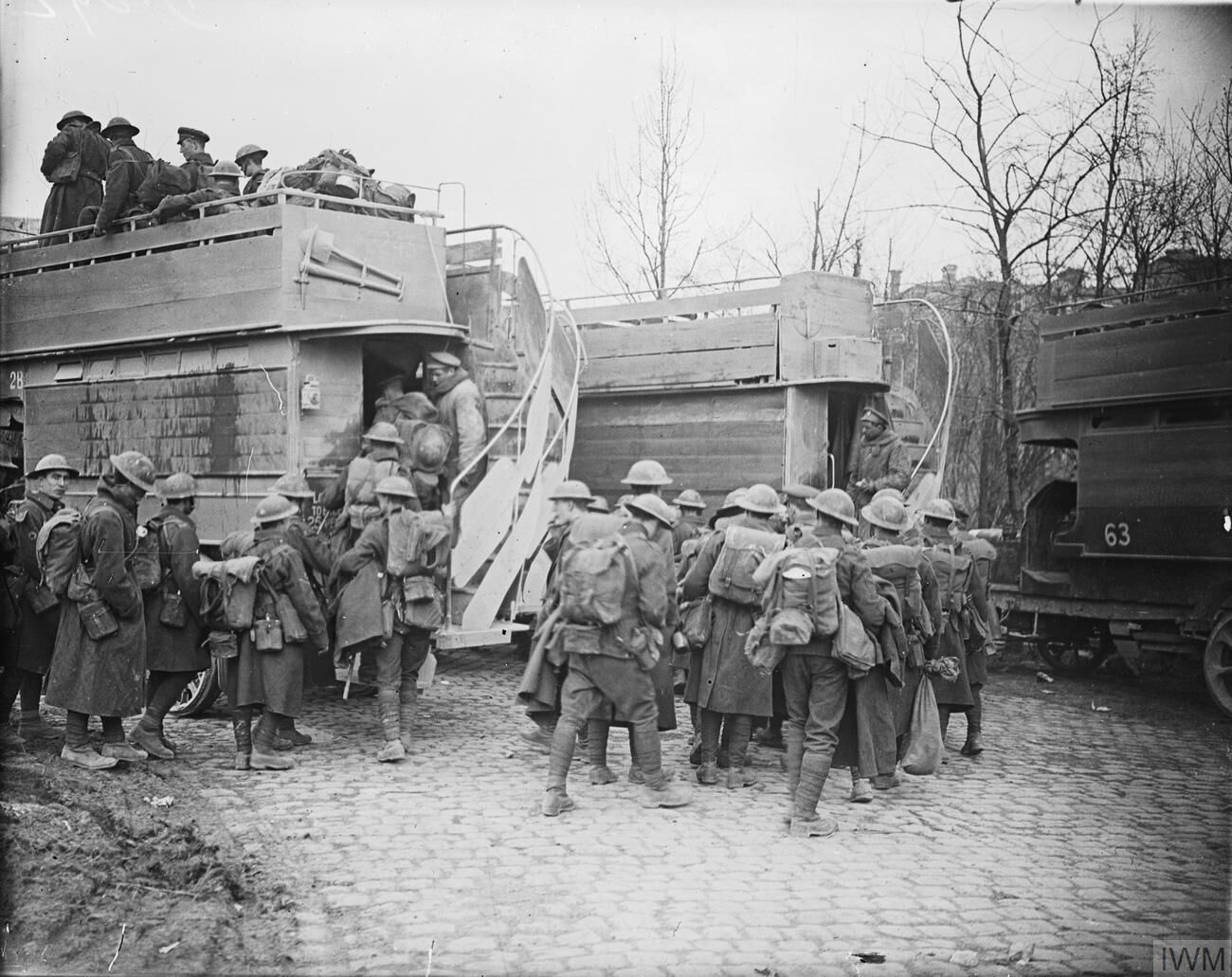
British troops returning from the front during the Battle of Arras.

- French Army Mutinies – The Second Division of the French Third Army began disobeying orders as the Nivelle offensive wound down, causing a chain reaction of mutinies throughout the French Army.
- Battle of Arras – British forces launched a third attack on German positions along the Scarpe River in France, including the French villages of Bullecourt and Hendecourt-lès-Cagnicourt. The British 62nd Division successfully held off German attempts to recapture Bullecourt but Hendecourt-lès-Cagnicourt remained firmly in German hands. Meanwhile, a British assault to capture Oppy Wood near Arras, France, proved disastrous, with 2,417 casualties.
- The Hong Kong General Chamber of Commerce established the Constitutional Reform Association of Hong Kong.
- The Swedish Linnaeus Society was founded on the 210th anniversary of the birth of Swedish naturalist Carl Linnaeus.
- Born:
  - Kiro Gligorov, Macedonian state leader, first President of Macedonia; in Štip, Kingdom of Serbia (present-day North Macedonia) (d. 2012)
  - William Mulloy, American anthropologist and archaeologist, known for leading research on the Plains Indians of North America and Polynesian prehistory (including the moai statues of Easter Island); in Salt Lake City, United States (d. 1978)
  - Betty Comden, American comedienne, best known for her collaboration with Adolph Green; as Basya Cohen, in New York City, United States (d. 2006)
- Died: Isawa Shūji, 65, Japanese academic, founder of University of Tsukuba, Central School for the Deaf and Tokyo University of the Arts (b. 1851)

== May 4, 1917 (Friday) ==
- Second Battle of the Aisne – French forces captured Brimont, France, from the Germans.
- Battle of the Hills – French forces captured portions of Mont Cornillet and Mont Blond in France.
- British troopship Transylvania was sunk by German submarine SM U-63, with the loss of 402 lives.
- Imperial German Navy Zeppelin L 43 attacked a Royal Navy naval squadron in the North Sea near the Dogger Bank, hitting light cruiser HMS Dublin with bombs. It was one of the few cases of an airship attacking warships.
- Born: Josef Wurmheller, German air force officer, commander of Jagdgeschwader 2 for the Luftwaffe during World War II, recipient of the Knight's Cross of the Iron Cross; in Hausham, German Empire (present-day Germany) (d. 1944, killed in action)

== May 5, 1917 (Saturday) ==
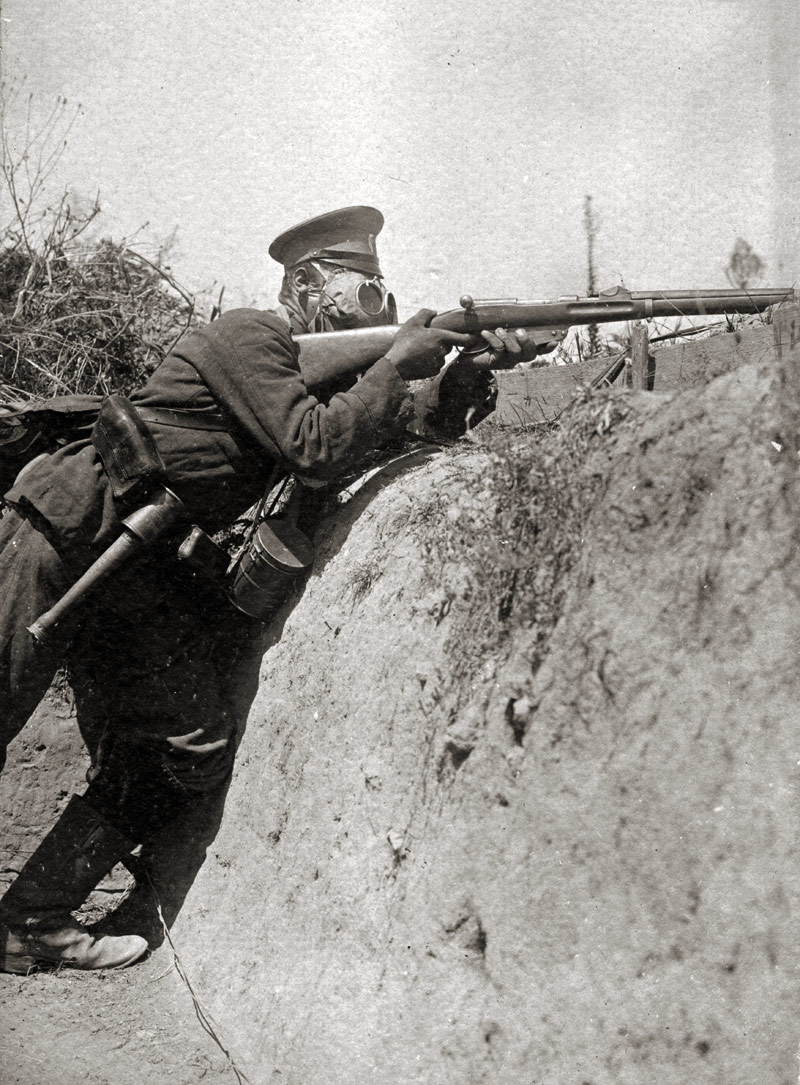
Bulgarian soldier firing his rifle from a trench during the Battle of the Crna Bend.

- At the Battle of the Crna Bend, Allied forces, including French, Italian and Russian battalions, launched a major offensive to break the stalemate on the Macedonian front in the Balkans by shelling German and Bulgarian positions are the Crna River in Serbia (now North Macedonia).
- At the Second Battle of the Aisne, the French Fourth Army captured two key German defenses around Chemin des Dames, France, and captured 3,350 German prisoners and 27 guns, while the Sixth Army reached the outskirts of German-held Allemant, Aisne, France and took c. 4,000 prisoners.
- The incumbent Nationalist Party of Australia led by Billy Hughes returned to power as the Australian Government in the federal elections.
- Voters in Queensland, Australia, rejected a referendum to abolish the state's Legislative Council.
- The United States Army established the 4th and 5th Aero Squadrons.
- Born:
  - Jimmy Murray, Gaelic football player, centre-forward for Roscommon and St. Patrick; in Knockcroghery, Ireland (d. 2007)
  - Patrick Lynch, Irish economist, proponent of education and development economics, advocate for Ireland joining the European Economic Community; in Dublin, Ireland (d. 2001)
  - Aage Eriksen, Norwegian wrestler, silver medalist at the 1948 Summer Olympics; in Notodden, Norway (d. 1998)
  - George C. Baldwin, American physicist, leading researcher into photofission including the discovery of giant resonance; in Denver, United States (d. 2010)

== May 6, 1917 (Sunday) ==
- José Gutiérrez Guerra won the presidential election in Bolivia to become its 34th president.
- Battle of the Crna Bend – German and Bulgarian forces began counter-maneuvers against Allied patrols monitoring the bombardment of the Central Powers defenses along the Crna River in Serbia.
- A German plane dropped a bomb on London, killing one person.
- The Estonian Radical Socialist Party was formed in Tallinn, Estonia. Two months later, the Social Travaillist Party formed and both merged in 1919 to become the Estonian Labour Party.
- Born:
  - Rex T. Barber, American air force officer, member of Operation Vengeance that located and shot down the plane carrying Japanese Grande Admiral Isoroku Yamamoto, recipient of the Silver Star and Navy Cross; in Culver, Oregon, United States (d. 2001)
  - Jack Stewart, Canadian ice hockey player, defenceman for the Detroit Red Wings and Chicago Blackhawks from 1937 to 1953; as John Sherratt Stewart, in Pilot Mound, Manitoba, Canada (d. 1983)
  - Leonid Brekhovskikh, Russian oceanographer, co-discover of the deep sound channel in oceans; in Strunkino, Russian Empire (present-day Russia) (d. 2005)
- Died: Thomas Carr, 77, Irish-Australian clergy, Archbishop of Melbourne from 1886 to 1917 (b. 1839)

== May 7, 1917 (Monday) ==
- Battle of the Crna Bend – The Allies intensified bombardment of Central Powers defenses along the Crna River in Serbia. However, the Bulgarians were able to maintain their defenses despite sustaining 945 casualties over four days of shelling.
- German submarine SM UB-39 struck a mine and sank in the North Sea with all 24 crew on board.
- British flying ace Major Mick Mannock claimed his first kill. However, the same day, British flying ace Captain Albert Ball, with 44 victories to his name, was killed in a crash following a dogfight with German pilot Lothar von Richthofen (who also crashed but survived).
- Cecil McKenzie Hill made the first flight for the Canterbury Aviation Company in Sockburn, New Zealand, which was used to train more pilots for military and commercial purposes.
- The National Music Publishers' Association was established in the USA to "protect its members' property rights on the legislative, litigation, and regulatory fronts."
- Loretta Young made her screen debut in an uncredited role for the screen adaptation of the Ruth Sawyer novel The Primrose Ring, directed by Robert Z. Leonard.
- Born:
  - David Tomlinson, English actor, best known for his roles in live action Disney films including Mary Poppins, Bedknobs and Broomsticks and The Love Bug; in Henley-on-Thames, England (d. 2000)
  - Russell Foskett, Australian air force officer, commander of the No. 94 Squadron during World War II, recipient of the Order of the British Empire and Distinguished Flying Cross; in Roseville, New South Wales, Australia (d. 1944, killed in action)
  - Anthony Provenzano, American gangster, member of the Genovese crime family, member of the Teamsters Union and connected to the disappearance of union leader Jimmy Hoffa; in New York City, United States (d. 1988)
  - Domenico Bartolucci, Italian clergy and composer, director of Accademia Nazionale di Santa Cecilia in Vatican City; in Borgo San Lorenzo, Kingdom of Italy (present-day Italy) (d. 2013)

== May 8, 1917 (Tuesday) ==
- Battle of Doiran – A British force of 43,000 men under command of Lieutenant-General George Milne launched a second offensive against a Bulgarian force of 30,000 men commanded by Colonel Vladimir Vazov at Doiran Lake in Serbia, following an April attack that failed to overtake the opposing side's defenses.
- German submarine SM UC-26 was rammed and sunk by a British destroyer in the English Channel, killed all 26 crew on board.
- Sections of the Italian Socialist Party and the Italian General Confederation of Labour met in Milan and, following fierce debate, approved a call inviting organizations and individual workers to comply with "discipline" to the directives of the party and not to take "isolated and fragmented" initiatives.
- The third Far Eastern Championship Games were held in Tokyo.
- The Ballard Locks opened for fishing and cargo vessels in Salmon Bay, Washington.
- Born: John Anderson Jr., American politician, 36th Governor of Kansas; in Olathe, Kansas, United States (d. 2014)
- Died: Thomas M. Anderson, 81, American army officer, general of U.S. forces during the Spanish–American War and Philippine–American War (b. 1836)

== May 9, 1917 (Wednesday) ==
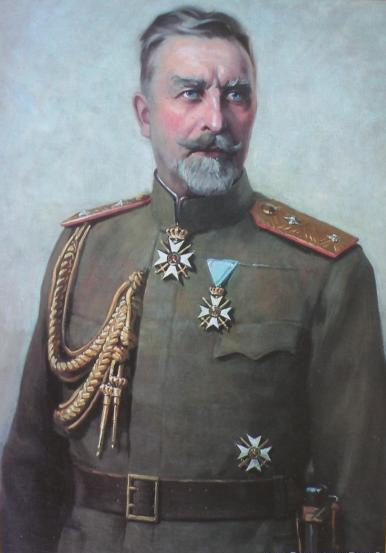
Lieutenant General Vladimir Vazov.

- The Nivelle offensive was abandoned with the end of the Second Battle of the Aisne. French forces had suffered a total 187,000 casualties that, while lower than the Battle of Verdun, were high in what was supposed to be a promising offensive to bring about the end of fighting on the Western Front.
- Battle of the Crna Bend – The Allies launched a massive infantry assault on the Central Powers defenses but failed to make any gains. Casualties for the Allies were 5,450, while the Bulgarians sustained total casualties of 1,626. German casualties were unknown.
- Battle of Doiran – British forces failed to dislodge Bulgarian defenders at Doiran Lake in Serbia. With casualties at 12,000, the British called off further attacks. Bulgarian commander Vladimir Vazov was promoted to Major-General for achieving a major victory over the British.
- The United States Army established the 14th, 15th and 16th Aero Squadrons.
- Born: Abd al-Fattah Abu Ghudda, Syrian religious leader, third Supreme Guide of the Syrian Muslim Brotherhood; as ʿAbdul-Fattah, in Aleppo, Ottoman Empire (present-day Syria) (d. 1997)

== May 10, 1917 (Thursday) ==
- Tenth Battle of the Isonzo – Italian forces launched a major offensive on the Austro-Hungarian front, and were able to advance to the coastal town of Duino, located 15 kilometers from Trieste, by the end of the month.
- Second Battle of the Aisne – The French made small gains northeast of Mont Haut and repulsed a German attack at Mont Téton. By then, the French had captured an estimated 28,500 German prisoners and 187 German guns.
- Sinn Féin candidate Joseph McGuinness won a by-election in South Longford against the Irish Parliamentary Party, making it a political disaster for John Redmond and his party.
- The United States Army established the 34th Aero Squadron.
- Born: Margo, Mexican American actress, known for roles in Lost Horizon, The Leopard Man, Viva Zapata!; as María Margarita Guadalupe Teresa Estela Bolado Castilla y O'Donnell, in Mexico City, Mexico (d. 1985)
- Died: Joseph B. Foraker, 70, American politician, 37th Governor of Ohio (b. 1846)

== May 11, 1917 (Friday) ==
- German flying ace Edmund Nathanael, with 15 victories to his name, was shot down and killed by Scottish flying ace Captain William Kennedy-Cochran-Patrick in what was his 9th of 21 victories.
- The Yale Precision Marching Band was established as the official marching band for Yale University.
- Born:
  - John B. Calhoun, American biologist, developed the concept of behavioral sink to explain certain behaviors that arise when there is overcrowding; in Elkton, Tennessee, United States (d. 1995)
  - Sheikh Anwarul Haq, Pakistani judge, 9th Chief Justice of Pakistan; in Jullundur, British India (present-day Jalandhar, India) (d. 1995)
  - Jack Pleis, American jazz musician, known for piano collaborations with major recordings artists including Benny Goodman, Louis Armstrong, Harry Belafonte, Bing Crosby, and Sammy Davis Jr.; in Philadelphia, United States (d. 1990)

== May 12, 1917 (Saturday) ==
- Thoroughbred racehorse Omar Khayyam was the first foreign-bred horse to win the Kentucky Derby with a time of 2:04.60 in the 43rd running of the event.
- The Indian Institute of Architects was established in Bombay with George Wittet as the first president.
- Frear Park opened in Troy, New York.
- The ballet The Wooden Prince by Béla Bartók premiered in Budapest.
- Born:
  - Frank Clair, American football coach, head coach for the Toronto Argonauts and Ottawa Rough Riders where he led the team to three Grey Cup wins; in Hamilton, Ohio, United States (d. 2005)
  - Abdul Bakeer Markar, Sri Lankan politician, 12th Speaker of the Parliament of Sri Lanka; as Mohammed Abdul Bakeer Markar, in Beruwala, British Ceylon (present-day Sri Lanka) (d. 1997)
  - Maya Deren, Ukrainian-born American filmmaker, best known for her experimental short films Meshes of the Afternoon and At Land; as Eleonora Derenkovska, in Kiev, Russian Empire (present-day Kyiv, Ukraine) (d. 1961)

== May 13, 1917 (Sunday) ==
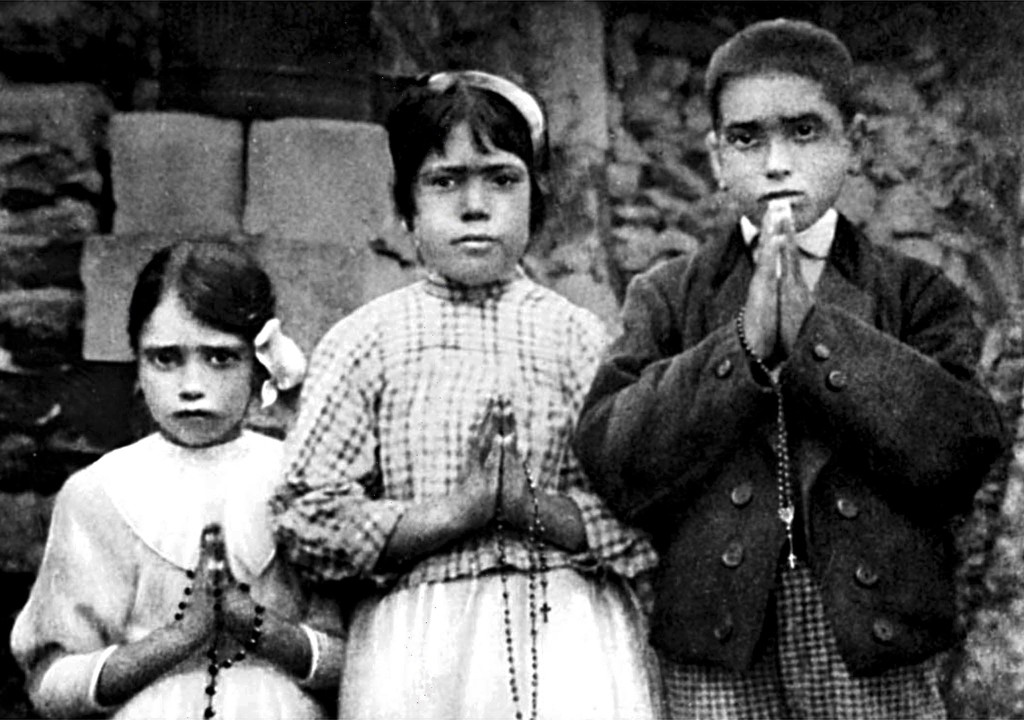
Lúcia dos Santos (center) and cousins Francisco and Jacinta Marto (either side)

- Ten-year-old Lúcia Santos and her cousins Francisco and Jacinta Marto reported a series of Marian apparitions near Fátima, Portugal, which become known as Our Lady of Fátima. The female vision, described by Santos as "brighter than the sun", instructed the children to pray daily to bring about the end of World War I and told them that a miracle would occur on October 13.
- The nuncio Eugenio Pacelli, the future Pope Pius XII, was consecrated Archbishop by Pope Bendedict.
- A referendum was held in Switzerland, with voters in favor for amendments to the stamp duty in the Swiss constitution.
- Football club Real Madrid beat Getxo 2–1 in the Copa del Rey Final, in front of a crowd of 2,500 at the Camp de la Indústria in Barcelona.

== May 14, 1917 (Monday) ==
- Battle of the Strait of Otranto – An Austro-Hungarian naval squadron raided an Allied naval blockade in the Strait of Otranto between Italy and Albania.
- Royal Naval Air Service Flight Commander Robert Leckie, while flying a Curtiss, shot down German Zeppelin L 22, the first time a flying boat shot down an airship.
- German submarine SM U-59 struck a mine and sank in the North Sea, killing 33 of the 37 crew on board.
- Romanian socialist leader Max Wexler was shot dead by his guards while in transit to a command post in Iași, Romania. Official reports said he was attempting to escape custody but supporters claimed it was a planned assassination by the Romanian military. Romanian Prime Minister Ion I. C. Brătianu ordered an inquiry into his death but no firm proceedings were made, leaving the circumstances around his death a mystery.
- Cecil B. DeMille released the drama A Romance of the Redwoods. It starred Mary Pickford and became her hit of the year and fourth top-grossing film of 1917. A film copy survived and is kept at the George Eastman Museum in Rochester, New York
- Born:
  - Lou Harrison, American composer, known for such compositions as Concerto in Slendro and Concerto for Piano and Javanese Gamelan; in Portland, Oregon, United States (d. 2003)
  - W. T. Tutte, British mathematician, member of the Bletchley Park team that broke the Lorenz code used by German armed forces during World War II, leading contributor to matroid and graph theory; as William Thomas Tutte, in Newmarket, Suffolk, England (d. 2002)
  - Ralph Heikkinen, American football player, guard for the Michigan Wolverines football team from 1936 to 1938 and the Brooklyn Dodgers in 1939; in Hancock, Michigan, United States (d. 1990)
  - Bob Thurman, American baseball player, leading pitcher for the Homestead Grays and Kansas City Monarchs in the Negro leagues and outfielder for the Cincinnati Reds from 1955 to 1959; as Robert Thurman, in Kellyville, Oklahoma, United States (d. 1998)
- Died: Joseph Hodges Choate, 85, American lawyer and diplomat, best known for his litigation cases in the Chinese Exclusion Act, the Income Tax Suit, and prohibition cases in Kansas, U.S. ambassador to the United Kingdom from 1899 to 1905 (b. 1832)

== May 15, 1917 (Tuesday) ==
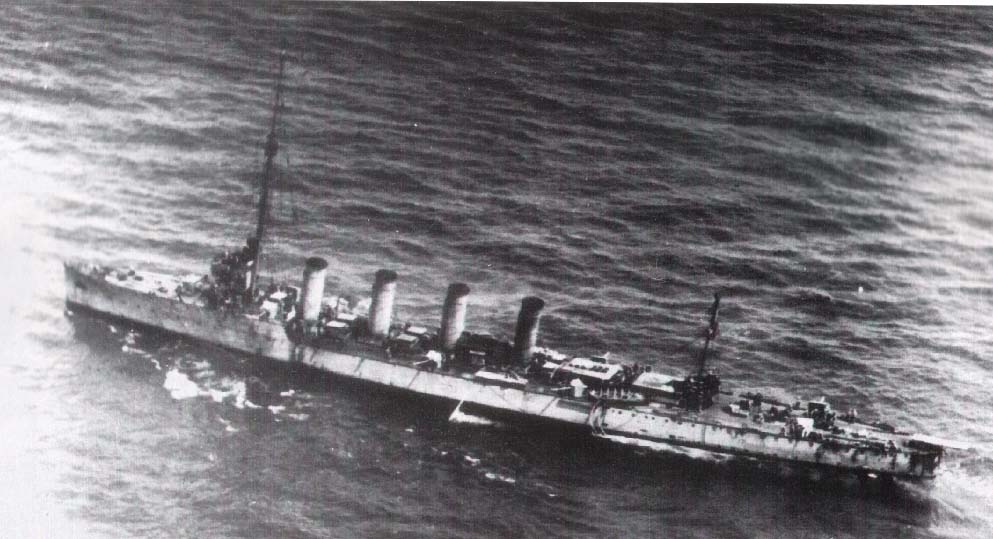
The damaged Austro-Hungarian cruiser Novara after the Battle of the Strait of Otranto.

- Robert Nivelle was replaced as Commander-in-Chief of the French Army by Philippe Pétain.
- At the Battle of the Strait of Otranto, British destroyers HMS Dartmouth and Bristol, accompanied by Italian naval vessels, attempted to cut off the raiding Austro-Hungarian Navy squadron as it retreated. Dartmouth managed to disable Austro-Hungarian cruiser SMS Novara but in turn was hit by a torpedo fired from German submarine UC-25 that killed five crewmen. While pursuing the retreating sub, French destroyer Boutefeu struck a mine and sank, with heavy loss of life.
- Japanese bathroom manufacturer Toto was established in Kitakyushu, Japan as Tōyō Tōki (Oriential Ceramics).
- The 56th Infantry Regiment of the United States Army was established.
- The 21st Aero Squadron of the United States Army was established.
- The township of Lyndhurst, New Jersey, was incorporated.
- Born:
  - Eleanor Maccoby, American psychologist, lead researcher in child development, author of The Development of Sex Differences; as Eleanor Emmons, in Tacoma, Washington, United States (d. 2018)
  - Ron Saggers, Australian cricketer, batsman for the New South Wales cricket team from 1939 to 1951 and the Australia national cricket team from 1948 to 1950; as Ronald Arthur Saggers, in Marrickville, New South Wales, Australia (d. 1987)
- Died: Isaac Bentham, 30, British Olympic champion water polo player; killed in action during the Battle of Arras (b. 1886)

== May 16, 1917 (Wednesday) ==
- Battle of Arras – The offensive wound down with no breakthrough in the German Hindenburg Line, which had proven effective in holding back Allied attacks. The British overall suffered 150,000 casualties, while German casualties were estimated between 120,000 and 130,000. Some 25 British soldiers and officers received the Victoria Cross for actions during the battle.
- French Army Mutinies – Units with the 18th and 127th Divisions of the French Third Army began to mutiny.
- British Prime Minister David Lloyd George announced that he wanted immediate Home Rule for the 26 counties in Ireland, but six north-eastern counties were to be excluded for a period of five years.
- American writer Ernest Poole released his first novel His Family through Macmillan Publishers, which would win the first Pulitzer Prize for Fiction the following year.
- Born:
  - Juan Rulfo, Mexican writer, best known for his anthology El Llano en llamas and novel Pedro Páramo; as Juan Nepomuceno Carlos Pérez Rulfo Vizcaíno, in Sayula, Jalisco, Mexico (d. 1986)
  - Vera Rózsa, Hungarian singer and voice instructor, tutored renowned singers including Kiri Te Kanawa, Sonia Theodoridou, Tom Krause, Anne Sofie von Otter, Anthony Rolfe Johnson and Ildikó Komlósi (d. 2010)
  - Woodrow W. Keeble, America soldier, recipient of the Medal of Honor posthumously for action during the Korean War (after a campaign led by family and the Sisseton Wahpeton Oyate tribe of the Dakota people); in Waubay, South Dakota, United States (d. 1982)
  - Ben Kuroki, American aircraft pilot, only Japanese American to fly missions in the Pacific Ocean theater of World War II, three-time recipient of the Distinguished Flying Cross and Distinguished Service Medal; in Gothenburg, Nebraska, United States (d. 2015)
  - George Gaynes, Dutch American actor, best known for comedic roles including Commandant Eric Lassard in the Police Academy series and Henry in the 1980s television sitcom Punky Brewster; as George Jongejans, in Helsinki, Grand Duchy of Finland, Russian Empire (present-day Finland) (d. 2016)

== May 17, 1917 (Thursday) ==
- The 33rd Aero Squadron was established by the United States Army.
- The Nicaraguan football club Diriangén was established in Diriamba, Nicaragua, and became the most successful football club in the country's history with 25 league titles.
- Born:
  - Lou Gordon, American journalist, best known for news magazine show The Lou Gordon Program on WKBD-TV; in Detroit, United States (d. 1977)
  - Charles Scherf, Australian air force officer, commander of the No. 418 Squadron during World War II, recipient of the Distinguished Service Order and Distinguished Flying Cross; in Emmaville, New South Wales, Australia (d. 1949, killed in a car crash)
  - Winslow Anderson, American artist, best known for his glass work with Blenko and Lenox; in Plymouth, Massachusetts, United States (d. 2007)
  - Dmitry Maevsky, Russian painter, member of the Leningrad Union of Artists, known for landscape work including The Ukrainian homestead and April; in Petrograd, Russian Empire (present-day Saint Petersburg, Russia) (d. 1992)
- Died:
  - Charles Brook, 87, British state leader, a member of the White Rajahs that ruled the Sarawak in Borneo (b. 1829)
  - Radomir Putnik, 70, Serbian army officer, Chief of the Serbian General Staff from 1912 to 1915 (b. 1847)
  - Stephen P. Moss, 76, American politician, member of the Oregon House of Representatives from 1882 to 1889 (b. 1840)

== May 18, 1917 (Friday) ==
- French Army Mutinies – A unit with 166th Division of the French Third Army made a demonstration against command.
- United States Congress passed the Selective Service Act, allowing U.S. President Woodrow Wilson to establish the Selective Service System to oversee conscription in the United States.
- The Ukrainian General Military Committee was established as the highest military governing body for the Ukrainian People's Republic.
- The ballet Parade by Jean Cocteau, with music by Erik Satie, premiered at the Théâtre du Châtelet in Paris. The premier was noteworthy for Pablo Picasso creating the set design. Ballet choreographer Léonide Massine also appeared as the male leader dancer with Ernest Ansermet conducting the orchestra.
- Norwegian sports club Trondheims-Ørn was established in Trondheim, Norway with sections for association football, Nordic skiing, speed skating, track and field, swimming, handball, and ice hockey. By 1984, all its programs were reduced to its women's football program when it became known as Rosenborg. It is now one of the most famous of the women's football clubs in Norway, with seven Norwegian Women's Premier League championship titles and eight Norwegian Football Cup titles.
- Born: Bill Everett, American comic book artist, creator of Namor and Daredevil; as William Blake Everett, in Cambridge, Massachusetts, United States (d. 1973)
- Died: John Nevil Maskelyne, 77, British magician and inventor, known for odd Victorian era devices including the pay toilet (b. 1839)

== May 19, 1917 (Saturday) ==
- Battle of the Hills – French forces wrested control of Mont Cornillet, France from the Germans at significant cost.
- The white star centered in a blue circle with a red disc centered within the star was adopted as the official national insignia for all United States Armed Forces aircraft.
- Indonesian women's activist Nyai Ahmad Dahlan established Aisyiyah, an organization dedicated to improving women's access to education, health care and social services in the Dutch East Indies (now Indonesia).
- The silent drama One Law for Both was released, directed by Ivan Abramson and starring Rita Jolivet and James W. Morrison as Russian siblings fleeing revolution in their country. The film is now considered lost.
- The football club Odd was established in Trondheim, Norway and was renamed to its current title Rosenborg in 1928.
- Born: Robert Gordon Robertson, Canadian public servant, 7th Commissioner of the Northwest Territories; in Davidson, Saskatchewan, Canada (d. 2013)
- Died:
  - Valentine Fleming, 35, British politician and army officer, recipient of the Distinguished Service Order, father to writer Ian Fleming; killed in action (b. 1882)
  - Belva Ann Lockwood, 86, American lawyer and activist, first woman to practice law before the Supreme Court of the United States (b. 1830)
  - Walter Beverly Pearson, 55, American industrialist and inventor, president of the Standard Screw Company, unacknowledged great-grandson to Thomas Jefferson and Sally Hemings (b. 1861)

== May 20, 1917 (Sunday) ==
- Battle of the Hills – France launched a major assault on the German line between Mont Cornillet and Le Téton, capturing 985 prisoners and reporting another 600 German dead.
- French Army Mutinies – The 128th Regiment of the French Third Division and 66th Regiment of the French 18th Division joined the mutiny.
- British warship HMS Paxton was sunk by German submarine SM U-46 in the Atlantic Ocean west of the Skellig Islands, killing 31 crew and taking two survivors prisoner.
- Lithuanian Day – A worldwide collection of donations was held in Roman Catholic churches for the benefit of Lithuanian war refugees.
- The small town of Codell, Kansas, was struck by a tornado, the second of three that occurred consecutively on the same date every year until 1918.
- Born:
  - Tony Cliff, British activist, founder of the Socialist Workers Party; as Yigael Glückstein, in Zikhron Ya'akov, Ottoman Empire (present-day Israel) (d. 2000)
  - Richard Cobb, British historian, leading expert of the French Revolution, author of The People's Armies; in Frinton-on-Sea, England (d. 1996)
  - David McClelland, American psychologist, developer of the need theory; in Mount Vernon, New York, United States (d. 1998)
- Died:
  - Philipp von Ferrary, 67, Italian stamp collector, compiled the most complete worldwide stamp collection including rare stamps such as the Treskilling Yellow and the British Guiana 1c magenta (b. 1850)
  - Romilda Pantaleoni, 69–70, Italian opera singer, best known for her lead performances in operas such as Mefistofele, La Gioconda, Otello and Edgar (b. 1847)

== May 21, 1917 (Monday) ==
- A massive fire destroyed 73 blocks in Atlanta and left 10,000 people homeless.
- Battle of the Hills – French forces repulsed a German counterattack around Mont Cornillet, France.
- German submarine SM UC-36 was rammed and sunk by a French steamship in the Bay of Biscay, killing all 26 crew.
- U.S. military air base Chanute Field was established near Rantoul, Illinois, as one of the 32 U.S. Army flight training airfields during World War I.
- The Imperial War Graves Commission was established to look at means of preserving the graves of war dead, eventually becoming the Commonwealth War Graves Commission.
- The first National Kitchen opened in London, which provided a professional restaurant experience at a price of sixpence a meal for individuals and families facing financial difficulties during World War I. By late 1918, some 363 National Kitchens were opened throughout the United Kingdom.
- Born:
  - Raymond Burr, Canadian actor, best known for the title lead role in the television series Perry Mason; in New Westminster, British Columbia, Canada (d. 1993)
  - Frank Bellamy, British comic book artist, best known for his work on Eagle; in Kettering, England (d. 1976)
  - Ronald Colville, Scottish noble, Governor of the Bank of Scotland and Captain of the Queen's Bodyguard of Scotland; in Glasgow, Scotland (d. 1996)
  - Victor Henry Anderson, American spiritual leader, founding member of the pagan movement Feri Tradition; in Clayton, New Mexico, United States (d. 2001)
  - Babatunji Olowofoyeku, Nigerian politician, attorney general of Western State of Nigeria from 1963 to 1966; in Ilesa, Northern Nigeria (present-day Nigeria) (d. 2003)
- Died: Maurice Guillaux, 34, French aviator, first pilot to fly airmail and a seaplane in Australia; killed in a plane crash (b. 1883)

== May 22, 1917 (Tuesday) ==
- A lynch party kidnapped and burned alive Ell Persons, an African-American accused of the rape and murder of 16-year old white girl Antoinette Rappel, in Memphis. Despite the large crowd of eyewitnesses and extremely brutal nature of the lynching, no suspects were apprehended.
- The United States Coast and Geodetic Survey Corps — the predecessor to the NOAA Commissioned Officer Corps — was established as the seventh uniformed service of the United States.
- Born:
  - Sid Melton, American actor, best known for his roles in the television sitcoms Green Acres and The Danny Thomas Show; as Sidney Meltzer, in New York City, United States (d. 2011)
  - Georg Tintner, Austrian-Canadian conductor, best known for his work with Opera Australia and Symphony Nova Scotia, recipient of the Order of Canada; in Vienna, Austria-Hungary (present-day Austria) (d. 1999)
  - George Aratani, American business leader, founder of Mikasa and owner of the Kenwood Corporation; in Gardena, California, United States (d. 2013)

== May 23, 1917 (Wednesday) ==
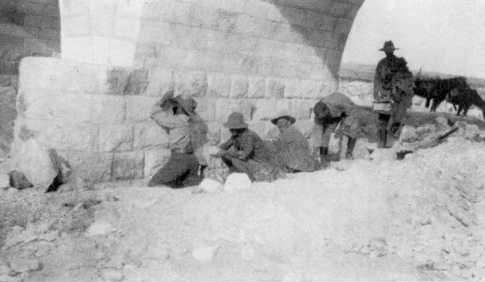
British soldiers laying gun cotton charges at the base of a bridge during a raid on Ottoman railways.

- Battle of the Hills – French artillery halted German counterattacks on Mont Haut, France.
- A month of civil violence in Milan ended after the Italian army forcibly took over the city from anarchists and anti-war revolutionaries. Fifty people were killed and 800 were arrested.
- During the Stalemate in Southern Palestine, the British Desert Column destroyed large sections of the railway line linking Beersheba to the main Ottoman Army desert base.
- Li Yuanhong, President of the Republic of China, dismissed Duan Qirui from his position as Premier of the Republic of China, creating an internal conflict in the government that led to an attempt to restore the Qing dynasty in July.
- After bad weather prevented six Imperial German Navy Zeppelins from conducting high-altitude raid on London, Kaiser Wilhelm of Germany concluded, "I am of the opinion that the day of the airship is past for attacks on London. They should be used as scouts for the High Seas Fleet and strategic reconnaissance, not for bombing raids on London." The Chief of the Naval Staff argued that airship bombing campaigns often succeeded in tying down many British personnel, guns, and aircraft on home air defense duties, and persuaded the Kaiser to allow further raids when weather conditions were favorable.
- The city of Elm Springs, Arkansas, was incorporated.
- Born:
  - Tatiana Riabouchinska, Russian ballet dancer, one of the noted Baby Ballerinas for the Original Ballet Russe; in Moscow, Russian Empire (present-day Russia) (d. 2000)
  - Edward Norton Lorenz, American mathematician, developer of chaos theory; in West Hartford, Connecticut, United States (d. 2008)
- Died:
  - Harry Lane, 61, American politician, 35th Mayor of Portland, Oregon, U.S. Senator from Oregon from 1913 to 1917 (b. 1855)
  - Ranavalona, 55, Madagascan noble, Queen of Madagascar from 1883 to 1897, last noble sovereign of Madagascar (b. 1861)

== May 24, 1917 (Thursday) ==
- German submarine SM UC-24 was torpedoed by French submarine Circé with the loss of all 26 crew.
- While flying as an observer aboard a German Aviatik, turbulence threw First Lieutenant Otto Berla from his cockpit without a parachute. As he fell, an updraft forced the tail of the aircraft upward, and Berla punched through the plywood of the fuselage aft of his cockpit. The aircraft's pilot returned him safely to base.
- B-1, the first U.S. Navy B-class blimp took flight.
- Convicted murderer Arthur Warren Waite was executed at Sing Sing prison in New York for the murders of John and Hannah Peck in 1916.
- Born: Ross Thatcher, Canadian politician, 9th Premier of Saskatchewan, father of Colin Thatcher; as Wilbert Ross Thatcher, in Neville, Saskatchewan, Canada (d. 1971)
- Died: Les Darcy, 21, Australian boxer, holder of the Australian Heavyweight Championship title; died of sepsis (b. 1895)

== May 25, 1917 (Friday) ==
- A series of tornadoes ravaged the American Midwest and Deep South over a 10-day period, starting with a twister that ripped through parts of Andale and Sedgwick, Kansas, killing 20 people. Two other tornadoes in other parts of the state killed another four.
- The first Luftstreitkräfte (German Air Force) bombing campaign of Operation Türkenkreuz ("Turk's Cross") on London resulted in 95 deaths and 195 injuries. Seventy-four British aircraft took off to intercept, but the Germans lost only one aircraft.
- Battle of the Hills – French forces captured nearly all of Mont Cornille, France and captured 120 German prisoners.
- French flying ace Lieutenant René Dorme was killed in action. His 23 victories tied him with Lieutenant Gabriel Guérin for ninth-highest-scoring French ace of World War I.
- The National School of Agriculture was established in Managua, Nicaragua, and was renamed later the National Agrarian University in 1986 when it was incorporated into the National Autonomous University of Nicaragua.
- The Norwegian sports club Åndalsnes was established in Åndalsnes, Norway. It currently hosts association football, gymnastics, track and field, handball and Nordic skiing.
- Born:
  - Theodore Hesburgh, American clergy and academic, 15th President of University of Notre Dame; in Syracuse, New York, United States (d. 2015)
  - Steve Cochran, American actor, best known for his roles in The Best Years of Our Lives, Copacabana and White Heat; as Robert Alexander Cochran, in Eureka, California, United States (d. 1965)
  - James Plimsoll, Australian politician, 22nd Governor of Tasmania; in Sydney, Australia (d. 1987)
- Died:
  - Maksim Bahdanovič, 25, Belarusian poet, best known for his poetry collection Vianok (A Wreath); died of tuberculosis (b. 1891)
  - Édouard de Reszke, 63, Polish opera singer, known for his work with Paris Opera and his recordings, including the opera Martha (b. 1853)
  - William H. H. Miller, 76, American politician, 39th United States Attorney General (b. 1840)

== May 26, 1917 (Saturday) ==
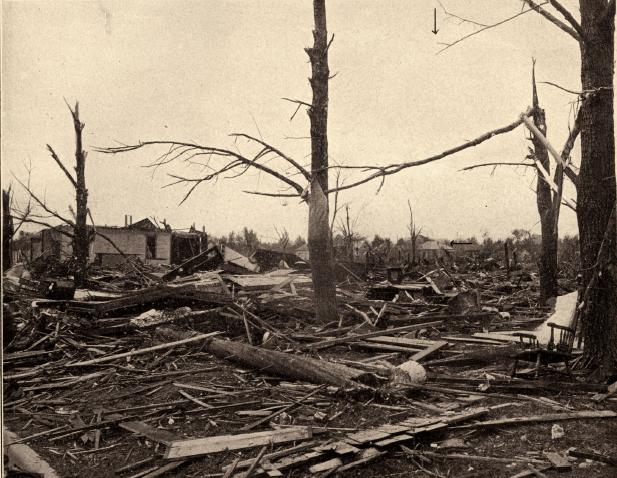
Tornado damage in Mattoon, Illinois.

- Battle of Monastir – Bulgarian forces drove off French troops and re-occupied part of Hill 1248 north Monastir, Serbia, but the summit remained unoccupied by both sides. While it relieved some pressure off the Allied-held Serbian city, French casualties for the battle eventually were estimated at 14,000 killed, wounded or sick. Casualties for the Central Powers were unknown, and some 500 civilians were killed and another 650 were injured.
- A tornado struck Mattoon, Illinois, causing devastation and killing 101 people. Other tornadoes that same day in Illinois and Indiana killed 10 more people.
- British hospital ship HMHS Dover Castle was torpedoed and sunk in the Mediterranean Sea by German submarine SM UC-67. Seven crew were lost with the survivors rescued by HMS Cameleon.
- The United States Army established the 26th Aero Squadron.
- Born: Anton Christoforidis, Greek boxer, world light heavyweight champion in 1941, the first Greek nationality to win the title; in Mersin, Ottoman Empire (present-day Turkey) (d. 1985)

== May 27, 1917 (Sunday) ==
- Tornadoes in Missouri, Arkansas, Kentucky, Tennessee, and Alabama killed a total of 141 people.
- Pope Benedict issued a promulgation of the Code of Canon Law.
- A Royal Navy seaplane sunk German submarine SM UC-66 in the Atlantic Ocean using depth charges, killing all 26 crew on board.
- Born:
  - Estrella Alfon, Filipino author, four-time recipient of the Palanca Awards for works including With Patches of Many Hues and The White Dress; in Cebu, Philippine Islands (present-day Philippines) (d. 1983)
  - George T. Reynolds, American physicist, member of the Manhattan Project; in Trenton, New Jersey, United States (d. 2005)
- Died: Yevgeni Ivanovich Alekseyev, 74, Russian naval officer, commander of the Imperial Russian Navy during the Russo-Japanese War (b. 1843)

== May 28, 1917 (Monday) ==
- French Army Mutinies – The French Third Army faced mutinying soldiers in the 5th, 9th, 158th, and 1st Cavalry Divisions.
- Battle of the Hills – German counterattacks on Le Téton and Le Casque, France failed.
- A mob of 3,000 white men marched into East St. Louis, Illinois, and attacked African-American residents after weeks of escalating tensions for competing jobs in the St. Louis area. Illinois Governor Frank Orren Lowden ordered the National Guard into the city to quell the rioting.
- Three tornadoes in Alabama killed eight people.
- Metropolitan Bishop Andrey Sheptytsky of the Greek Catholic Church appointed Leonid Feodorov as the first Russian Catholic Apostolic Exarchate of Russia.
- Benny Leonard defeated Freddie Welsh at New York City to win the World Lightweight Championship, which he held until he retired in 1925.
- New York City Subway stations for the BMT Jamaica Line, including Woodhaven Boulevard, Elderts Lane, Forest Parkway, 104th Street, and 111th Street were opened for service.
- Born:
  - Papa John Creach, American blues musician, best known for his violin work with Louis Armstrong, T-Bone Walker, Jefferson Airplane, Grateful Dead and other artist; as John Henry Creach, in Beaver Falls, Pennsylvania, United States (d. 1994)
  - Barry Commoner, American biologist, leading expert on ecology and pioneer of environmentalism, author of The Closing Circle and The Poverty of Power; in New York City, United States (d. 2012)
  - Marshall Reed, American actor, best known for his character actors and stunt work in Westerns including Riding with Buffalo Bill; in Englewood, Colorado, United States (d. 1980)
- Died: Juan Bautista Ambrosetti, 51, Argentine anthropologist, credited for pioneering the study of anthropology in Argentina (b. 1865)

== May 29, 1917 (Tuesday) ==
- American auto engineers Jesse G. Vincent and Elbert J. Hall were summoned to Washington, D.C. by the Aircraft Production Board to design a new aircraft engine to outfit in newer Allied aircraft. The two met at Willard Hotel in Washington, D.C. and within five days developed design plans for the Liberty aircraft engine.
- Born:
  - John F. Kennedy, American state leader, 35th President of the United States, U.S. Senator from Massachusetts from 1953 to 1960; in Brookline, Massachusetts, United States (d. 1963, assassinated)
  - Fred Ascani, American air force officer, vice-commander for the Air Force Test Center, one of the developers of systems engineering at Wright Field; as Alfredo John Ascani, in Beloit, Wisconsin, United States (d. 2010)
  - Élie de Rothschild, French financial leader, manager of the French branch of the Rothschild banking empire, son of Robert de Rothschild; in Paris, France (d. 2007)
- Died: Kate Harrington, 85, American poet, best known for her poetry collections Letters from a Prairie Cottage and Emma Bartlett (b. 1831)

== May 30, 1917 (Wednesday) ==
- Tornadoes in Missouri killed a total 65 people.
- Battle of the Hills – German efforts to recapture Mont Blond from the French failed.
- The Original Dixieland Jass Band recorded "Darktown Strutters' Ball" and released it through Columbia Records.
- Died: John Henry Upshur, 93, American naval officer, one of the commanding officers of the Union blockade during the American Civil War, commander of the Pacific Squadron from 1882 to 1885 (b. 1823)

== May 31, 1917 (Thursday) ==
- French Army Mutinies – Mutiny spread in the French Third Army to 5th, 6th, 13th, 35th, 43rd, 62nd, 77th and 170th Divisions, with a total 21 units revolting and 27,000 soldiers refusing to go to the trenches on the Western Front.
- Battle of the Hills – German forces attacked French positions at Mont Haut, Le Casque and Le Téton but were defeated.
- A tornado landed outside of Marietta, Oklahoma, and killed three people.
- Vice-Admiral Henry Oliver, Chief of the Admiralty War Staff, became the first British naval officer appointed Deputy Chief of the Navy as part of the formation of the Admiralty Naval Staff. As well, Rear-Admiral Alexander Ludovic Duff was appointed as the first Assistant Chief of Naval Staff of the First Sea Lord.
- The United States Army established the 10th Aero Squadron.
- Born:
  - Jean Rouch, French filmmaker, considered the father of Nigerian cinema and a pioneer of cinéma vérité in films including Moi, un noir and Chronicle of a Summer; in Paris, France (d. 2004)
  - Brian Kingcome, British air force officer, commander of No. 92 Squadron during the Battle of Britain, recipient of the Distinguished Flying Cross and Distinguished Service Order; as Charles Brian Fabris Kingcome, in Calcutta, British India (present-day Kolkata, India) (d. 1994)
  - Billie Rogers, American jazz musician, noted for her collaborations with Woody Herman and Jerry Wald and one of the first major female musicians of the big band era; as Zelda Louise Smith, in North Plains, Oregon, United States (d. 2014)

== Sources ==
- The Times History of the War. Vol. XIV (online scan ed.). London: The Times. 1914–1921. OCLC 70406275 – via Archive Foundation.
