= Jyrki Niskanen =

Finnish singer (born 1956)

Jyrki Niskanen (born 12 February 1956) is an operatic tenor from Finland.

Niskanen was born in Helsinki and started his musical career as an entertainment musician, playing piano, keyboard and accordion, accompanying many of the well-known Finnish artists of the 1970s-1980s.

Niskanen studied piano at the Sibelius Academy in Helsinki and obtained diploma in improvisation and free accompaniment. He studied singing at the Sibelius Academy, in London with Vera Rózsa and in Vienna and Berlin with Peter Berne. Niskanen is known for his versatile and strong voice, possessing a dramatic tone. His sonorous tenor excels in strong Wagner operas and Italian operas.

Niskanen made his professional debut in Fidelio at the Savonlinna Opera Festival in 1992, and was invited to Zürich Opernhaus. Since then he has performed in most major tenor roles and in major international opera houses.

He has given concert performances in Finland, Norway, Estonia, Germany, Spain, Switzerland and United States, with many leading conductors.

Niskanen has composed some 800 pieces of music and one musical for children (premier in 2012 in St. Petersburg), and has arranged several pieces of music for orchestra and choir.

== Recordings ==
- Recital in Helsinki (1990)
- Arias and Love Songs (1994)
- Holy Night, Christmas Songs(1996)
- Beethoven 9th symphony (with Orchestra La Scala, conductor Riccardo Muti) (1998)
- Operetten (with Eva Martón and Westdeutscher Rundfunk Köln) (1998)
- Tristan und Isolde, High Lights (as Tristan, with Lorin Maazel) (2001)
- Kulkuset ja kellot soivat, Christmas Songs (2004)
- Atlantic Sky: Piano Solos, own compositions (2011)
- Joulun tähden: Christmas Songs, own compositions (2011)
- The Greatest Tenor Arias (2012)
