= Marie Te Hapuku =

New Zealabd opera singer

Marie Te Hapuku (formerly Marie-Adele McArthur) is an operatic soprano from Gisborne, New Zealand, and is a direct descendant of the Māori chief, Te Hapuku., of the Ngāti Kahungunu tribe.

== Life and career ==
Te Hapuku began her career performing as a mezzo-soprano under the name Marie-Adele McArthur. After studying at Brigham Young University, she joined the young artist program of the Utah Opera (UO) in 1992. She made her professional debut with the UO in December 1992 as Hänsel in Engelbert Humperdinck's Hänsel und Gretel with Katy Hill as Gretel. Earlier that year she won first place in the San Francisco Opera (SFO) auditions. This earned her a place in the SFO's Merola Opera Program; a training ground for young opera singers. The competition win also earned her a place in the SFO's touring company, the Western Opera Theater (WOT). She made her WOT debut as Prince Orlofsky in Die Fledermaus in 1993 at the Montalvo Arts Center. The production toured to the New Jersey State Theatre among other venues.

Te Hapku continued to study singing in Utah with Betty Jeanne Chipman. In 1994 she was a soloist with the Utah Chamber Artists in performances of Johann Sebastian Bach's "Magnificat" and Maurice Duruflé's Requiem. By 1996 she was appearing in recitals as a soprano. In 1998 she was a soloist with the American West Symphony (AWS) in a concert of Christmas music by Bach and Handel among other composers. She performed with the AWS again the following year as Abigaille in concert version of Giuseppe Verdi's Nabucco and as the soprano soloist in Verdi's Requiem.

Te Hapuku has been the recipient of several awards and has won several major competitions including the Jay Darwin Memorial Award for the San Francisco Opera Auditions, the Sir Frank Tait Bursary award, the Willi Fels Memorial Trust, and the Sylvia Lerner and Wagner Society awards for the Metropolitan Opera National Council Auditions. Prestigious opera companies include the Metropolitan Opera, the Liceu, Sarasota Opera, Phoenix Opera, The NBR New Zealand Opera, Utah Festival Opera, Opera North, and OperaDelaware. Te Hapuku is also active as a concert recitalist and has appeared with several professional music ensembles including the Syracuse Symphony Orchestra, the Knoxville Symphony, the San Jose Symphony, the Brooklyn Philharmonic, Italo Marchini's Coro Lirico, the American West Symphony, the Brooklyn Symphony Orchestra, the New Zealand Chamber Orchestra, Queensland Pops Orchestra and Queensland Symphony Orchestra. McArthur has also performed at the New Hampshire Music Festival and with the Mormon Tabernacle Choir.

Te Hapuku was also one of three featured artists in a gala concert as part of the celebrations for the 2002 Winter Olympic Games. Te Hapuku holds dual citizenship in the United States and New Zealand, and currently resides in New York City.

== Opera roles ==
- Abigaille, Nabucco (Verdi)
- Aida, Aida (Verdi)
- Amelia, Un ballo in maschera (Verdi)
- Donna Elvira, Don Giovanni (Mozart)
- Fiordiligi, Così fan tutte (Mozart)
- Leonora, Il trovatore (Verdi)
- Lina, Stiffelio (Verdi)
- Liù, Turandot (Puccini)
- Mimi, La bohème (Puccini)
- Rosalinda, Die Fledermaus (Johann Strauss II)
- Tosca, Tosca (Puccini)

== Solo concert work ==
- Bach's Christmas Oratorio
- Beethoven's Symphony No. 9
- Handel's Messiah
- Handel's Judas Maccabaeus
- Verdi's Requiem
