= Vera Rózsa =

Hungarian singer, voice teacher and vocal consultant (1917–2010)

Vera Rózsa OBE (or Vera Rózsa-Nordell, Hungarian: [ˈvɛrɒ ˈroːʒɒ]; 16 May 1917 – 15 October 2010) was a Hungarian singer, voice teacher, and vocal consultant. She lived in the United Kingdom from 1954.

== Education ==
She started her music education at the age of five. Her parents were teachers and having no baby-sitter at home, they simply took her along to school. Her parents, especially her father, were very musical (he played the violin). Vera Rózsa started to learn music also at an early age, her first instructor being her own father. She started to learn how to play the piano somewhat later.

After graduating from secondary school at the age of fifteen (much earlier than normal), Vera Rózsa began her musical studies at the Franz Liszt Academy of Music in Budapest. She studied conducting first, but later she switched to vocal studies. The composer and conductor Zoltán Kodály was one of her instructors.

== Personal life and career ==
Among Rózsa's first roles as a singer were the part of a Jewish lady in Handel's Judas Maccabaeus and Cherubino in Mozart's The Marriage of Figaro, which she performed with OMIKE, the Budapest Jewish community's professional music and theatre group, in 1943. With a voice that covered both mezzo-soprano and alto, she adopted different singing styles and genres with a wide repertoire that ranged from the standard works of German and Italian opera, through Baroque cantatas and lieder to 20th century works and Yiddish folk songs.

As she belonged to the Jewish minority of her homeland, she witnessed the tragedy of losing many talented colleagues and other prominent cultural figures in the Holocaust, including her first husband, the composer and conductor László Weiner, who was deported by the Nazis to a forced labour camp in Slovakia and murdered there. She tried to save his life with the help of Zoltán Kodály, who had also taught Weiner and was one of the witnesses at their wedding, but to no avail. She went into hiding herself, living with a false identity as a Christian. Her talent as an actress allowed her to walk unharmed out of two Gestapo interrogations. She also worked at the Swedish delegation in Budapest with Raoul Wallenberg who tried to save the lives of as many Jews as possible.

After the Second World War Rózsa was a soloist of the Budapest Opera (1945–1946) and later of the Vienna State Opera (1946–1951), where her singing career was disrupted by the partial loss of the use of one lung, the result of pneumonia sustained while she was in hiding from the Nazis. She visited a specialist in Brussels, who told her that she would never be able to sing more than nine or ten minutes at a time. As a result, she developed expertise in breathing technique that not only enabled her to continue singing, although not in demanding opera roles, but to make singing easier for many future students.

Rózsa married the Briton Ralph Nordell, whom she had originally met in Budapest when he was serving there with British military intelligence at the end of World War II, in Rome and they moved to Britain in 1954, and she gave birth to a son, David, on 2 August of that year. They had almost forty years of marriage together, until his death in 1991. In the UK, she began teaching privately in addition to continuing to perform in song recitals for several years. Following an acclaimed performance of Schoenberg's Pierrot Lunaire at the Leeds Festival, she was invited to teach at the Royal Manchester College of Music, which she did for about ten years. Later she was asked to teach at the London Opera Centre, the Opera Studio in Paris, and subsequently at the Guildhall School of Music in London, although she always taught mainly at her home in London.

As her career developed, she was invited to give master classes all over the world, including in Israel, France, Belgium, Italy, Sweden, Finland, the US, Venezuela, Australia, New Zealand and Japan. She was also a judge in many international singing competitions, including Cardiff, the Queen Elizabeth in Brussels, Athens, and a competition established in her honour in Jerusalem.

As a teacher, she stressed artistry and interpretation rather than vocal pyrotechnics. She was noted for refusing to impose her own style or technique on her students, but insisted on helping them to develop their own musical style, to the extent that judges at singing competitions would comment that if they couldn't pin down the identity of the teacher from a singer's style, then it was probably Vera Rózsa.

== Students ==
Among Rózsa's students were Sarah Walker, Cynthia Hoffmann, Kiri Te Kanawa, Ileana Cotrubaș, Sonia Theodoridou, Agathe Martel, Karita Mattila, Dorothea Röschmann, Tom Krause, Jyrki Niskanen, Mossa Bildner, Martina Bovet, Clarry Bartha, Anne Sofie von Otter, Anne Howells, Anthony Rolfe Johnson, Nancy Argenta, Lillian Watson, François le Roux, Nora Gubisch, Marie Te Hapuku, Ildikó Komlósi, Louise Werner, and many others. Maria Callas intended to work with Rózsa to make a career comeback, but died shortly before she could do so. Participation in her classes and courses is mentioned in many modern day classical music singers' CVs. Several of her own students, such as Noelle Barker, Enid Hartle and Jessica Cash, also became successful singing teachers in their own right.

== Awards ==
- In 1991 Rózsa was awarded the title of Officer of the Order of the British Empire.
- In 1992 she was awarded the Gold Medal of the Franz Liszt Academy of Music.
- In 1999 she was named a Freeman of the City of London.
- She has also been made a Fellow of the Guildhall School of Music and Drama and of the Jerusalem Rubin Academy of Music, and an honorary member of the Royal College of Music.

== Film about Vera Rózsa ==
- Vera Rózsa - Mother of Stars – a documentary film directed by Tiina-Maija Lehtonen, produced by the Finnish Broadcasting Company (YLE) in 1997. (Duration: 50 minutes.)

== See also ==
- Franz Liszt Academy of Music
- Hungarian State Opera House
- Vienna State Opera
- Guildhall School of Music and Drama
- Royal Northern College of Music
- Sarah Walker
- Kiri te Kanawa
- Marie Te Hapuku
- Karita Mattila
- Jyrki Niskanen
- Ileana Cotrubaș
- Agathe Martel
- Music education
- List of Hungarians
