= Cigale (ballet) =

1904 ballet by Jules Massenet

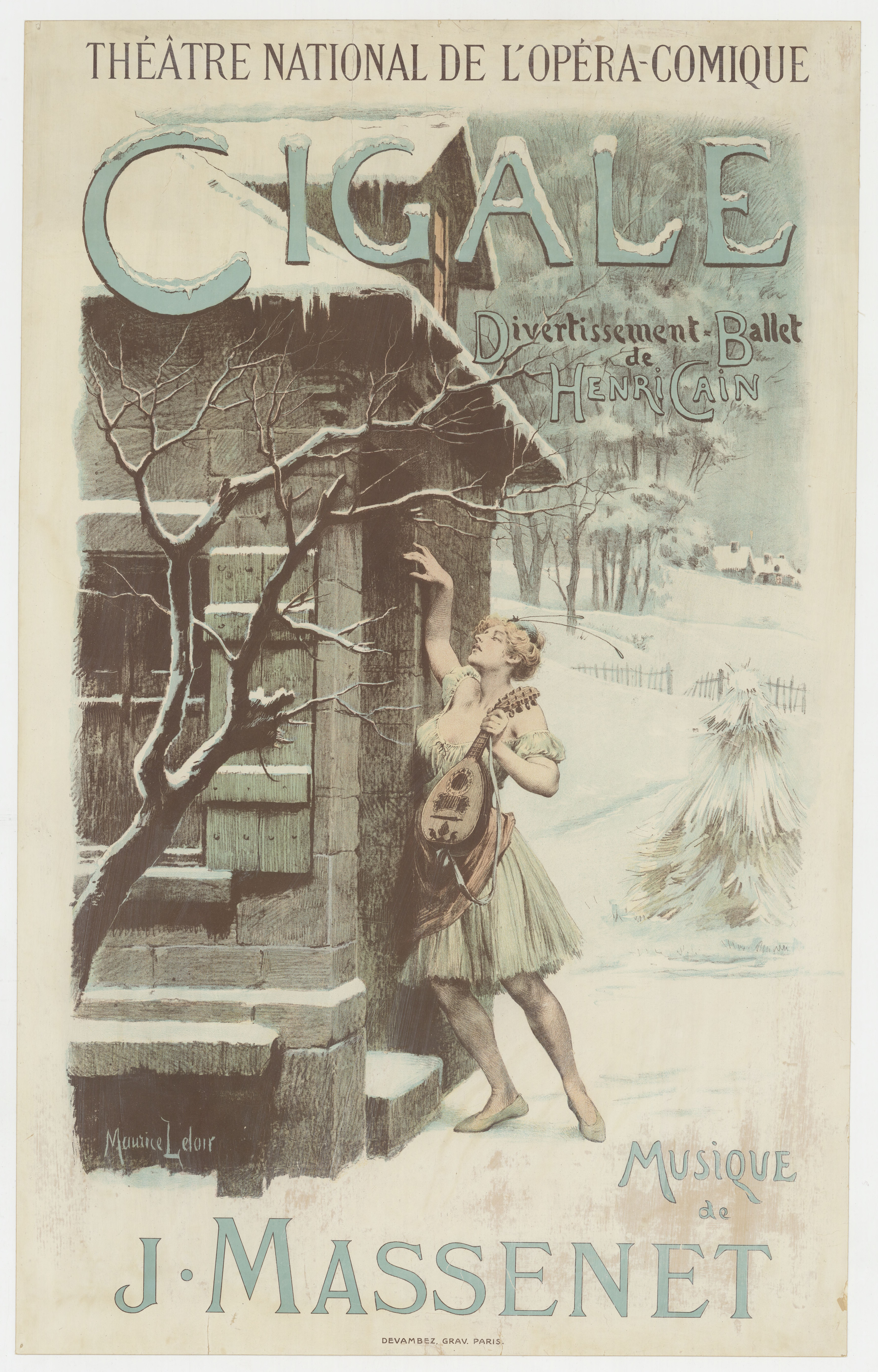
Poster for the original production by Maurice Leloir.

Cigale is a divertissement-ballet in two acts by Jules Massenet to a scenario by Henri Cain. It was composed in Égreville during the summer of 1902, first published by Heugel in 1903 and premiered at the Opéra-Comique in Paris on 4 February 1904.

== First performance ==
The first performance was part of a benefit programme for former musical and technical staff of the house, which raised over 10,000 francs. The programme having commenced with Bastien et Bastienne in a translation by Georges Hartmann and Henry Gauthier-Villars, also included Debussy's Damoiselle élue, with Mary Garden and J Passama, conducted by André Messager, a feature on musical interpretation under hypnosis by Professeur Magnin, poetry readings by Mlle Bartet and Coquelin ainé, songs from Yvette Guilbert, a selection of French operatic airs, a one-act pantomime entitled Feminissima with Jean Delvoye among the singers, and the 2nd act of Don Pasquale with Korsoff as Louise, Fugère as don Pasquale, Edmond Clément as Octave and Delvoye as the doctor.

The premiere dancers in Cigale were Jeanne Chasles (grasshopper), Louis Mesmaecker (ant), Mlle G Dugué (poor woman), Mlle Mary (the friend), M Delehaye (bank messenger boy). The angel's voice was Julie Girardon. In the music, James Harding noted the use of an old French carol and "deft variations on Au clair de la lune".

== Plot ==
The story is inspired by Jean de la Fontaine's fable La cigale et la fourmi (a version of The Ant and the Grasshopper), and portrays "Cigale" (Cicada) as a charitable young woman who takes pity on "La Pauvrette" (The Poor Girl) and gives away her breakfast, bonnet and red umbrella, and finally her money.

She is then ridiculed for her kindness by "Madame Fourmi" (Madam Ant), ticketed by "Le Garçon de Banque" (The Banker), and seduced by her "Petit Ami" (The Boyfriend).

On a cold winter's night, Cigale, whose kindness and carefree nature has led her to lose what little she has, is refused shelter by Madame Fourmi. Her lover and the poor girl enter and dance under her red umbrella. She falls to the grounds and dies in the snow grasping her guitar but the ballet ends with her ascending to heaven with the angels.

== Reception ==
Harding comments that "The worldly fabulist would have been discomfited at seeing his grasshopper, now a true Massenetic heroine, dying of hunger in the snow surrounded by angels and the murmur of a celestial choir...". The style of the work "a story in mime and dance" mixes both poetry and humour.

== Performance history ==
Cigale is rarely performed and is not part of the standard ballet repertory. The music was recorded by the National Philharmonic Orchestra conducted by Richard Bonynge on 28-29 November 1978 in the Kingsway Hall London with Enid Hartle and the London Voices, and first released on a Decca LP in 1980, then re-issued on compact disc in 1989 and 2001.

== Characters ==
- Cigale (Cicada)
- La Pauvrette (The Poor Girl)
- Le Petit Ami (The Boyfriend)
- Madame Fourmi (Madam Ant)
- Le Garçon de Banque (The Banker)
