= Enid Hartle =

British opera singer (1935–2008)

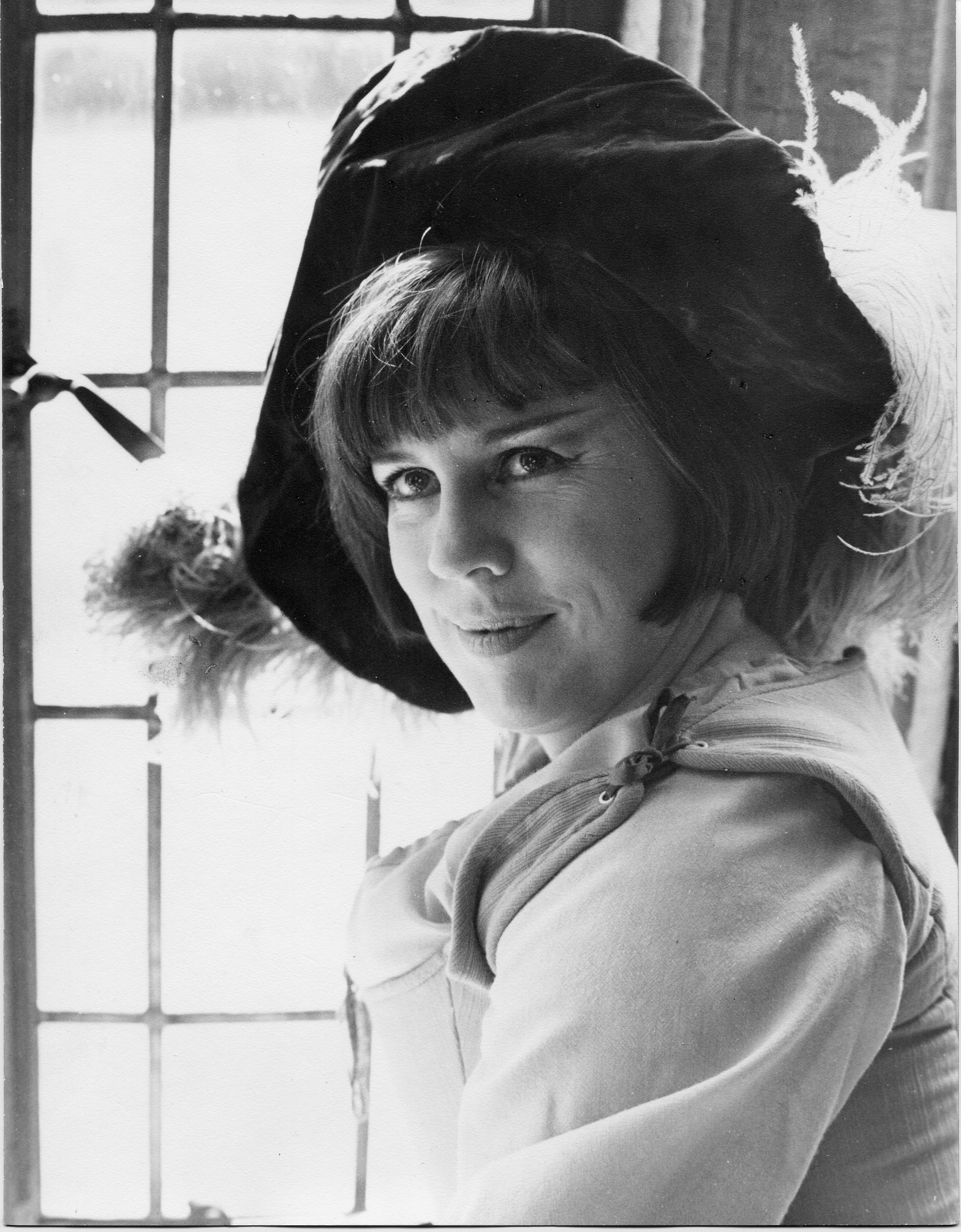

Enid Hartle (16 December 1935 – 1 December 2008) was an opera and concert singer born in Sheffield; she studied singing first at the Guildhall School of Music and Drama and later with Vera Rózsa, with whom she had a long and fruitful relationship.

== Operatic career ==
Enid Hartle's early appearances included Mrs Grose "a firmly sketched-in portrait of a comfortable old woman out of her depth" in The Turn of the Screw in 1966, London.

She began singing in the chorus of Glyndebourne Festival Opera in 1968 and the following year made her debut on the Glyndebourne Tour, singing Filipyevna in Eugene Onegin by Tchaikovsky. This role was to take her to, among other places, Toronto, Amsterdam, and The Royal Opera House in London; she also took part in the Decca recording under Georg Solti. In February 1971 she sang Marfa in three concert performances of Khovanshchina given by Chelsea Opera Group "ideally a little too light for the sepulchral and sibylline side of Marfa, but she radiantly suggested the woman in love, and her prayer in Act 5 was beautifully and movingly sung".

She was a lyric character mezzo-soprano and was employed by Glyndebourne both in the main season and on the tour for many years, where her roles included:

- La Natura and L'Eternità in La Calisto – Cavalli
- Dryade in Ariadne auf Naxos – Strauss
- Third Lady in The Magic Flute – Mozart
- Forester's wife, Owl, Woodpecker in The Cunning Little Vixen – Janáček
- The Fortune Teller in Arabella – Strauss
- Florence in Albert Herring – Benjamin Britten
- Baba the Turk in The Rake's Progress – Stravinsky.

She created the role of Miss Reid in Winter Cruise by Hans Henkemans which won her great praise from the Dutch press and whose "committed approach" allowed her to present act 1 "virtually a monologue for her... with consummate skill".

When not at Glyndebourne or abroad Hartle often sang with Kent Opera, where her roles included:

- Little Buttercup in H.M.S. Pinafore – Gilbert and Sullivan
- Arnalta in The Coronation of Poppea – Monteverdi, directed by Norman Platt
- Maddalena in Rigoletto – Verdi
- Mistress Quickly in Falstaff – Verdi, both of these Verdi operas directed by Jonathan Miller
- The Nurse in The Return of Ulysses - Monteverdi
- Nurse in King Priam – Tippett, directed by Nicholas Hytner
- Auntie in Peter Grimes – Britten
- Mrs Chin in A Night at the Chinese Opera – Judith Weir (role creation).

Many of these operas were conducted by Roger Norrington.

One critic noted in La fille du régiment "Enid Hartle's impeccably timed and cleverly under-played Marquise de Birkenfeld ... which conquered all in the second half. Her piano accompaniment to Marie's song, at once hesitant and bold, was an especial joy, while the agonised examination of her music when Marie and Sulpice broke into the Song of the Regiment roused gales of delighted laughter from the audience."

An obituary writer stated that she was a "keen observer of life and character" and a sensitive interpreter of unstarry roles, who was "revered by her students, who became her step-family".

== Concerts and recordings ==
Although primarily a stage performer, Hartle also sang with many of the leading orchestras at home and abroad, with whom she performed a wide range of works from Handel's Messiah to Berlioz’ Nuits d'Été and Schönberg's Pierrot lunaire.

In 1973 she took part in a rare performance of van Dieren's Symphony from the Chinese for the BBC in Manchester, conducted by Myer Fredman.

Her recordings include: two songs on a 1963 Saga LP entitled 'Music from Palm Court', La Calisto by Monteverdi (L’Eternità) realized and conducted by Raymond Leppard (1971), Eugene Onegin by Tchaikovsky (Filipyevna) with Georg Solti (1974), Ariadne auf Naxos by Strauss (Dryad) with Solti (1978), Suor Angelica by Puccini (Mistress of the Novices) with Richard Bonynge (1978), Cigale (solo, angel) by Massenet (1978), and Robinson Crusoe by Offenbach (Lady Crusoe) with Alun Francis (1980).

On video she appeared in Gilbert & Sullivan's The Sorcerer in 1982 (Mrs. Partlet), as the Nurse in the Kent Opera King Priam in 1985, and in Tchaikovsky's Queen of Spades from Glyndebourne in 1992 (Governess).

== Sources ==
The original of this article was compiled based on material prepared by Enid's colleagues and friends, Linda Gray and Sarah Walker.

== External sources ==
- Enid Hartle: The Singer, The Friend, The Teacher
