= National Kitchens =

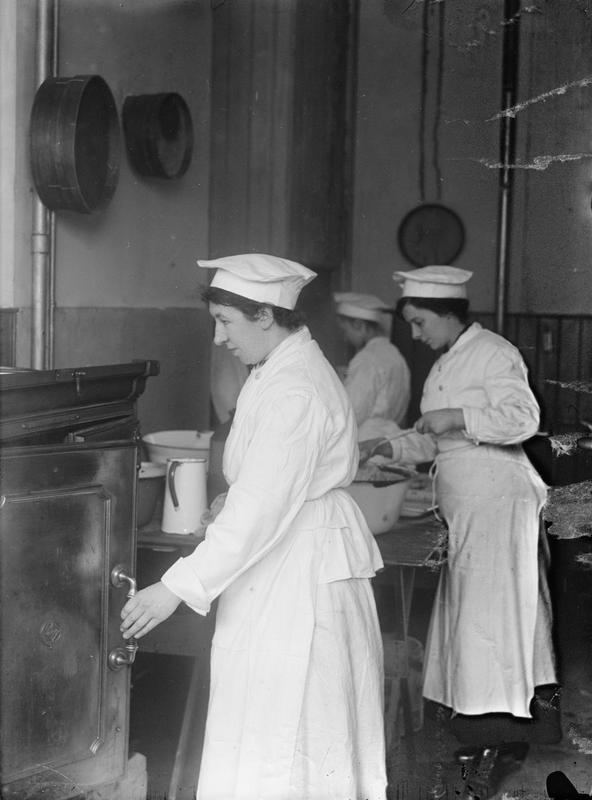
Cooks preparing a meal in a National Kitchen.

National Kitchens were restaurants established in a British Government initiative during the First World War to feed people cheaply and economically, at a time when food supplies were scarce because of the German U-boat campaign.

== History ==
Before the outbreak of war in 1914, the United Kingdom relied on imported food to feed the population; as much as 60 percent of food stocks had come from abroad. In wartime, the increased costs of shipping together with a complete lack of any government controls led to a rapid rise in the price of food, especially meat and bread. In addition, the Imperial German Navy had launched an unrestricted submarine blockade; in April 1917, a record 550,000 tons of shipping had been sunk. During the first years of the war, voluntary organisations began to open "communal kitchens" in various parts of the country. However, their public image was dreadful and only the poorest people made use of them. One government official stated: "It was thought that Public Kitchens were to be inflicted on the poor as some kind of punishment for a crime unstated". The newly created Ministry of Food adopted the idea of community kitchens but realised that they would have to be much better presented.

According to historian Bryce Evans, the government was highly sensitive to possible criticism of the National Kitchens as being soup kitchens. The Ministry of Food Control stated that the National Kitchens "must not resemble a soup kitchen for the poorest section of society" and should instead be places for "ordinary people in ordinary circumstances". A meal of soup, meat and vegetables was available for as little as sixpence, equivalent to roughly £1 today. However, in some kitchens there was nowhere to sit and in others patrons had to bring their own mugs and plates. To further distance them from charitable canteens, the kitchens were run in a businesslike manner: in at least one kitchen it was possible to "buy your Sunday dinner on Saturday"; the ability to show the means to pay for a meal in advance, and to make reservations as at a restaurant, would contribute to the image that the Kitchens were for "ordinary people."

The first National Kitchen was opened by Queen Mary in Westminster Bridge Road, London, on 21 May 1917. By late 1918 there were 363 National Kitchens. The kitchens were partly funded by the state and could typically feed up to 2,000 people per day. They were mainly staffed by volunteers, particularly well-to-do women who were anxious to "do their bit" for the war effort; serving in the kitchens became known as "canteening".

A typical menu comprised:

- soup
- roast meat
- meat pies
- fish
- suet puddings
- milk puddings
- scones
- cakes
- Yorkshire puddings

== List of National Kitchens ==
- Chelmsford, Market Place
- Chelsea
- Guildford, Ward Hall Street
- Hartlepool
- Huddersfield.
- Isle of Wight, Seaview
- Kensington, Victoria Memorial Hall, Kensington Place
- Oxford, 57–59 Woodstock Road, North Oxford
- Lambeth, Westminster Bridge Road
- Silvertown, North Woolwich Road, London
- New Bridge Street, City of London

== See also ==
- British Restaurant

== Sources ==
- Evans, Bryce (2017) The British 'National Kitchen' of the First World War. Journal of War & Culture Studies, 10. ISSN 1752-6272
- Evans, Bryce (2022). Feeding the People in Wartime Britain. Bloomsbury. ISBN 9781350259720.
