= American West Symphony =

Symphony orchestra in the United States

The American West Symphony is an orchestra based in Sandy, Utah. The symphony orchestra was found in 1988 under the name The Orchestra of Sandy. The orchestra's mission is one of cultural outreach to educate and entertain families. The orchestra's musical director is Joel Rosenberg.

The orchestra provides the community with 14 concerts per season. Repertoire includes works by Verdi, Rossini, Copland, Handel, Tchaikovsky, Haydn, Sibelius, Brahms, Bernstein, Rimsky-Korsakov and Berlioz. The yearly Christmas Concert also includes some popular selections as well.

The orchestra plays in venues within the Salt Lake Valley such as the Salt Lake Assembly Hall, the Salt Lake Tabernacle, Good Shepherd Lutheran Church, Libby Gardner Concert Hall, and the Sandy Amphitheater.
