= 1917 Swiss stamp duty referendum =

Referendum in Switzerland

13 May 1917
- Federal decree regarding the insertion of an Article 41 bis until and an Article 42, letter g, into the Federal Constitution (stamp duties)

Results
Choice	Votes	%
Yes	190,288	53.16%
No	167,689	46.84%
Valid votes	357,977	95.19%
Invalid or blank votes	18,086	4.81%
Total votes	376,063	100.00%
Registered voters/turnout	894,177	42.06%

A referendum on stamp duty was held in Switzerland on 13 May 1917. Voters were asked whether they approved of amending articles 41bis and 42 lit d of the constitution, which covered stamp duty. The proposal was approved by a majority of voters and cantons.

== Background ==
The referendum was a mandatory referendum, which required a double majority; a majority of the popular vote and majority of the cantons. The decision of each canton was based on the vote in that canton. Full cantons counted as one vote, whilst half cantons counted as half.

== Results ==
Choice	Popular vote		Cantons		
Choice	Votes	%	Full	Half	Total
For	190,288	53.2	14	1	14.5
Against	167,689	46.8	5	5	7.5
Blank votes	11,994	–	–	–	–
Invalid votes	6,092	–	–	–	–
Total	376,063	100	19	6	22
Registered voters/turnout	894,177	42.1	–	–	–
Source: Nohlen & Stöver
