= Sonia Theodoridou =

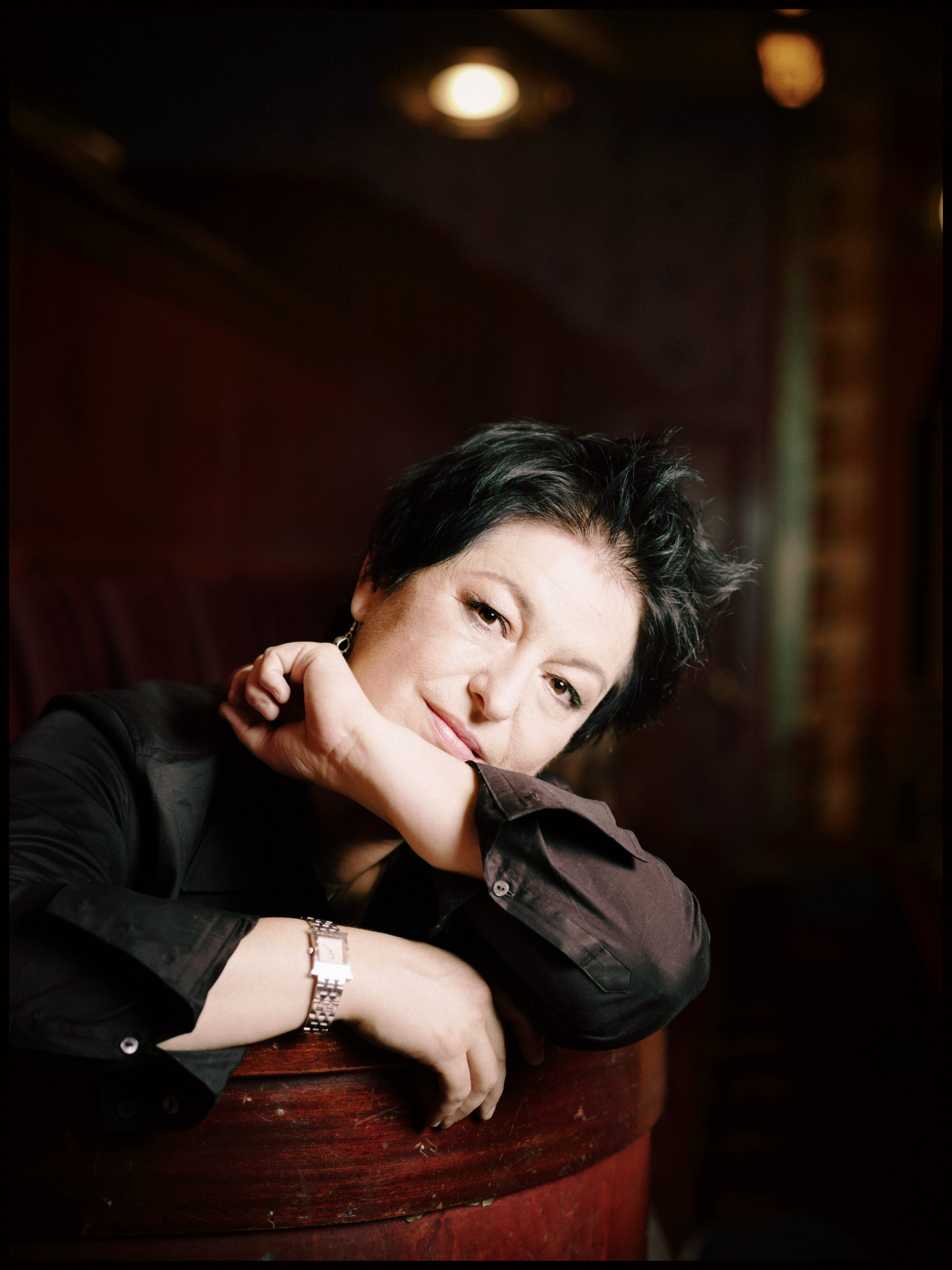
Sonia Theodoridou

Sonia Theodoridou (Greek: Σόνια Θεοδωρίδου; born 1958) is a soprano from Veria, Greece who has performed prestigious operatic roles internationally.

== Early life and education ==
Theodoridou was born in Veria in Macedonia, and grew up in Charavgi, a village in Agia Paraskevi, Eordaia. She attended the Greek National Conservatory (founded by composer Manolis Kalomiris), graduating with honors. Theodoridou received a Maria Callas scholarship to study at the Cologne Musical Academy and later moved to London to study with Vera Rózsa.

== Career ==
She has performed with the Frankfurt Opera, Berlin State Opera, Deutsche Oper Berlin, Hamburg State Opera, National Theatre Munich, Stuttgart State Theatre, Theatre Royal de la Monnaie, Théâtre du Châtelet, Teatro Comunale di Firenze, Teatro la Fenice, Theater Basel, Opéra National de Lyon, Opéra National de Montpellier, Hungarian State Opera House, Athens Concert Hall, Thessaloniki Concert Hall, Herodes Atticus Theatre, the Ancient Theatre of Epidaurus and the Ancient Theatre of Delphi. Theodoridou's roles have included Fiordiligi in Così fan tutte, Elvira in Don Giovanni, Pamina in The Magic Flute, the title role in Alcina, Violetta in La Traviata, Gilda in Rigoletto, Angelica in Suor Angelica, Mimi in La Bohème, Euridice in Orfeo ed Euridice, Salud in La vida breve, Fiorilla in Il Turco in Italia, Corinna in Il viaggio à Reims, Giulietta in I Capuleti e i Montecchi, the title role in Maria Stuarda, Cleopatra in Giulio Cesare, Jenny in Mahagonny and Santuzza in Cavalleria Rusticana. She has released two operatic CDs.

Theodoridou has said in interviews that she enjoys singing the work of Jacques Brel, Kurt Weill, Manos Hadjidakis, Mikis Theodorakis and Édith Piaf as much as she enjoys opera. In 2010 she and her husband (conductor Theodore Orfanidis) created "Orchestra Mobile", an orchestra composed of renowned European musicians who can play in every city literally at once. In April 2011, she organised and performed a charity concert with Orchestra Mobile at Parnassos Concert Hall in Athens to support victims of the 2011 Japanese earthquake. Theodoridou silently protested the return of Greek statues to Athens at the British Museum in June 2014.

== Personal life ==
In August 2011, Theodoridou married Theodoros Orfanidis, a conductor, in Crete. Theodoridou has a son from her first marriage.
