= Raid on the Beersheba to Hafir el Auja railway =

- Part of the Middle Eastern theatre of World War I
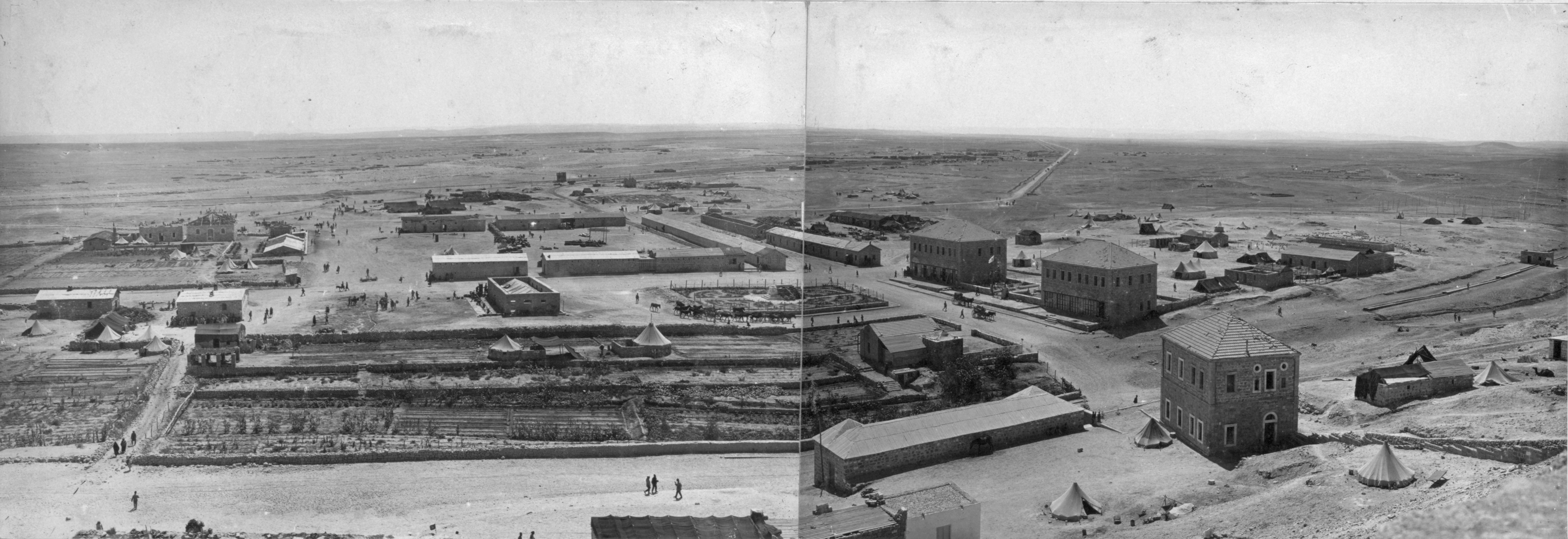
- The main Ottoman desert base at Hafir el Aujah
Date	23 May 1917
Location	in southern Palestine, just to the north of, and midway along the Egyptian frontier
Result	British victory

Belligerents
British Empire: United Kingdom of Great Britain and Ireland; Australia; New Zealand	Ottoman Empire

Commanders and leaders
(Australia) Harry Chauvel	Unknown

Units involved
Desert Column	

The Raid on the Beersheba to Hafir el Auja railway took place on 23 May 1917 after the Second Battle of Gaza and before the Battle of Beersheba during the Stalemate in Southern Palestine in the Sinai and Palestine Campaign of World War I.

Substantial sections of the Ottoman railway line, which ran south from Beersheba to Hafir el Auja, were attacked and demolished by working parties of the Royal Engineers of the Anzac and Imperial Mounted Divisions and the Imperial Camel Corps Brigade reinforced with men from the 1st Light Horse Brigade. They destroyed bridges and rails between Asluj and the main Ottoman Desert Base at Hafir el Auja, also known as Auja al-Hafir in the south. While the demolition force completed their work, the Imperial Mounted Division demonstrated against Beersheba, covered by the Anzac Mounted Division on their right.

== Background ==
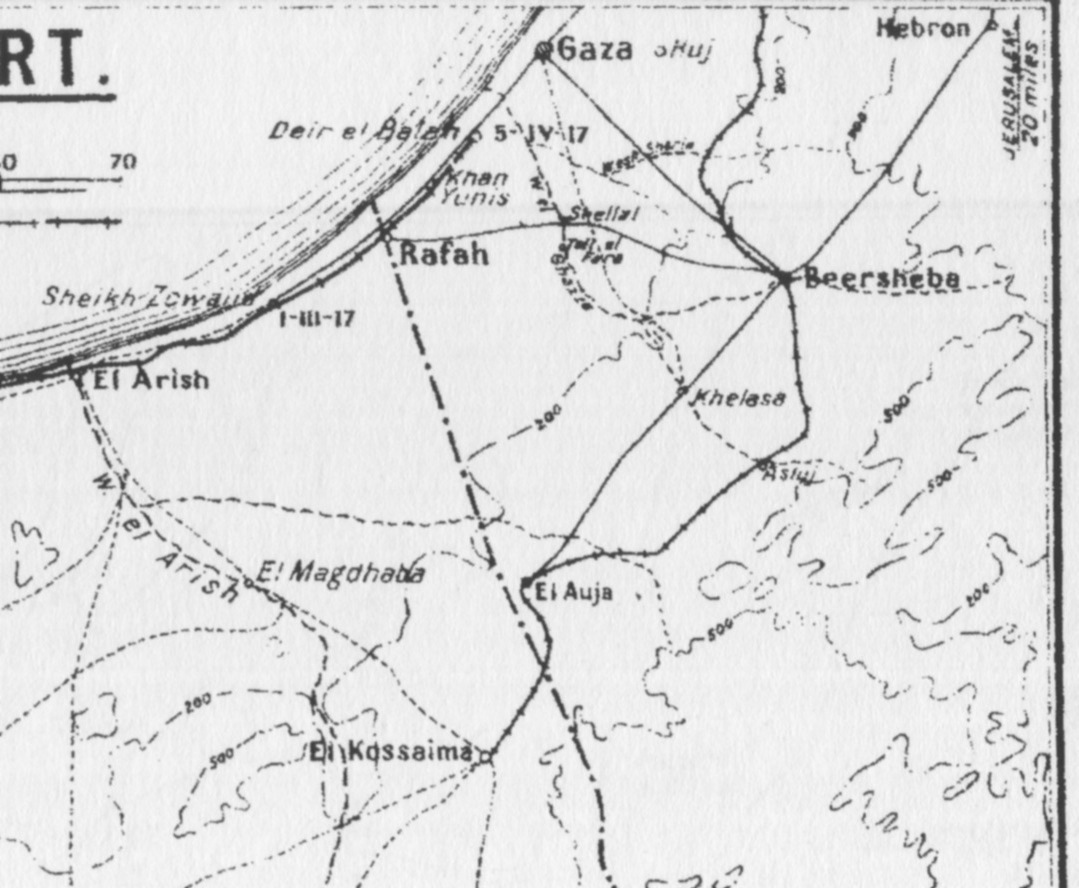
On the edge of the Eastern Desert

Although the railway bridge at Irgeig, north-west of Beersheba, was bombed by aircraft on 22 December 1916, when the bombs hit their target, the solid, strongly built bridge was found to be virtually indestructible from the air.

During a raid on the wells south of Beersheba between 7 and 14 May 1917, Nos. 2 and 16 Companies, Imperial Camel Brigade, a detachment of field troops and two motor ambulances, attacked the railway line between Beersheba and Hafir el Auja. The camels rode out from the Lines of Communication Defences Force via Kossaima when they blew up wells and a stone bridge. They also attacked a train near Hafir el Auja when five Ottoman railwaymen were captured. These prisoners said they had orders to pick up rails south of Hafir el Auja for use on "a new branch [railway line] from Et Tine to supply the front at Gaza," leaving the railway between Hafir el Auja and Beersheba intact. The line south from Hafir el Auja had almost reached the Wadi el Arish by December 1916. (Note: See Battle of Magdhaba and Battle of Rafa.)

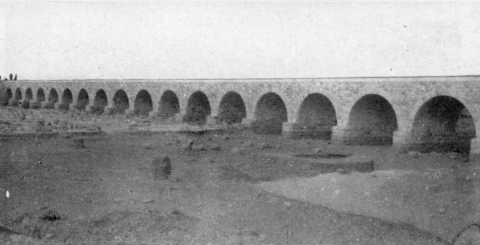
Eighteen Arch Ashlar Bridge at Asluj

While the railway line south from Beersheba to Hafir el Auja remained intact, it represented a constant threat to the long British Empire lines of communication stretching from Egypt, across the Sinai via El Arish to 5 miles (8.0 km) south of Gaza. Meissner, who had been involved with building the Baghdad Railway, constructed the railway, which crossed numerous wadis on "fine, arched bridges of dressed stone." This railway could be used at any time to transport large numbers of Ottoman troops to Hafir el Auja, which remained available for use as a base. The early May patrol had found well-built stone buildings, barracks, a hospital and a large water reservoir at Hafir el Auja, which Kress von Kressenstein had been forced to abandon in January as the EEF advanced up the coast to Rafa. From their base at Hafir el Auja, the railway could supply a substantial attacking force and housed many miles behind the Egyptian Expeditionary Force front line.

== Prelude ==
Lieutenant General Philip Chetwode commanding Eastern Force, ordered the destruction of large sections of this railway line.

=== Attacking force ===
The attacking force was organised into two columns

- Under the command of Edward Chaytor, commanding Anzac Mounted Division, the Engineers in the 1st Australian Field Squadron (Anzac Mounted Division) and the Imperial Mounted Division Field Squadron, escorted by the 1st Light Horse Brigade, rode from Shellal via Khalasa to Asluj, 12 miles (19 km) south of Beersheba.
- The Brigade Field Troop of the Imperial Camel Corps Brigade, escorted by their brigade, rode from Rafa to Hafir el Auja. The camel brigade rode along the Darb el Hager, the only possible way for a large body of troops moving from Rafa, along a plain between two banks of sand dunes. Their flank guards and patrols had considerable difficulty getting across the dunes as they rode along the boundary posts, which indicated the frontier between the Egyptian Sinai Peninsula and Ottoman Southern Palestine.

While the raid took place, the Imperial Mounted Division demonstrated to the southwest of Beersheba, and a wire-cutting bombardment was directed at the Gaza defences.

=== Demonstration southwest of Beersheba ===
On 20 May, the 3rd Light Horse Brigade (Imperial Mounted Division) received orders to "attract the attention of the enemy at Bir Saba from the raid on the railway line." A 60-pounder battery was attached to the division. The brigade marched with their Machine Gun Squadron, Notts Battery, ammunition column and field ambulance from Abasan el Kebir to Gamli on 21 May carrying their cardigan jackets, the men's blankets under the saddle, one day’s iron ration and forage on the horse. One day's supplies "on the mobile scale" were to be dumped at Gamli and picked up on their way back. Water was to be obtained at Gamli and "full use...[was to]...be made of any water discovered during operations". All ranks had to make the water they carried "last through the day," though full water carts accompanied the march.

On 22nd May, 1917, our section, Bob Louden, Basil Craig, Bill Martin and myself with Lieut. Rickeby hunted for a suitable crossing for the brigade and other units over the Wadi El Ghuzze. The banks were steep in places – up to 60 feet deep. Having found a suitable crossing, we took bearings to Hill 680 and piloted the Brigade to that position in the evening. It was unusually misty and damp and there was a heavy fog, but we arrived at the point of attack at dawn. We then pushed on towards Beersheba on our extreme right flank. We came in contact with the enemy cavalry patrols several times under their fire but drove them off and carried on. They could have tried to cut us off, but they usually avoided these tactics – the country being too open, I expect. Our section led the Brigade back to Tel el Fara after dark. We were used to very long hours in the saddle.

— Harry P. Bostock, Scout

=== Demolition squads ===
Within the 1st Light Horse and the Imperial Camel Brigades, special demolition parties were trained to assist the Royal Engineers. The Engineers in the Anzac and Imperial Mounted Divisions Field Squadrons and the Australian Field Troop attached to the Imperial Camel Corps Brigade, were reinforced by about 100 men from the mounted regiment who received intensive training in railway demolitions over a few days.

The Anzac Demolition Squadron were composed as follows: a) two rail demolition parties consisting of one officer and 53 other ranks with 10 pack horses and two half limbers carrying explosives b) one bridge demolition party consisting of two officers and 70 other ranks with two pack horses and three half limbers carrying explosives.

=== Advance to the Ottoman railway ===
Both columns rode out during the night of 22/23 May. Chaytor's column rode out at 19:00 on 22 May, with Chaytor travelling in a sand-cart due to ill health. As they marched through the night, a khamsin (known as khamaseen) wind full of dust and electricity blew from the south into their faces, so the troops had difficulty seeing and breathing. "A horse's mane, stroked, gave forth a shower of sparks."

Chaytor's column consisting of the 1st Light Horse Brigade, 6th Light Horse Regiment and Demolition Field Squadrons of the Anzac and Imperial Mounted Divisions and Desert Column's cable cart which was to lay cable to Hill 820, left camp at Tel el Fara at 15:00 on 22 May to arrive at Esani at 18:00 where they rested for two hours. (During the day, the helio communication was problematic, but the cable communication with Desert Column worked well.) The Anzac Mounted Division, less Chaytor's column, left Esani for the assembly point near el Gamli at 19:30.

At Esani, the demolition squads divided into separate groups, and with their allotted escort regiments, left Esani at 20:00 to travel to the Asluj to Hafir el Auja railway line via the Police Post at Asluj.

The Anzac Mounted Division arrived near Hill 820 at 02:00 but could not locate it. Instead, the division less the 1st Light Horse Brigade and Demolition party was established at Hill 770, 2 miles (3.2 km) south of Hill 820. The mistake was discovered later, but the division remained at Hill 770 for the day.

The New Zealand Mounted Rifles Brigade and the 2nd Light Horse Brigade took up a position at 02:30 facing east on the far side of the Wadi Ghuzzee. Khalasa had been surrounded and guarded while the division moved past. Subsequently, the 2nd Light Horse Brigade took up the line Asluj to Goz Sheihili in touch with the 1st Light Horse Brigade on their right and the New Zealand Mounted Rifles Brigade on their left, which brigade was in touch with the 2nd Light Horse Brigade. The 2nd Light Horse Brigade eventually came in touch with the 3rd Light Horse Brigade, Imperial Mounted Division on their left. Only the 2nd Light Horse Brigade was opposed just after daylight by armed Bedouin; one was killed, and the others were taken prisoner.

== Destruction of the railway ==
At daylight on 23 May, the New Zealand Mounted Rifle Brigade was north of the planned demolition site and in touch with the Imperial Mounted Division, which was to demonstrate against the Beersheba line and prevent any Ottoman troops attempting to stop the destruction of the railway. Only a few snipers tried to interrupt the work.

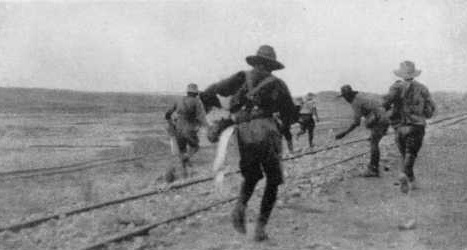
Laying the gun cotton charges on the railway line

Chaytor's northern column reached Asluj at 07:00 on 23 May and by 10:00 had set and exploded charges, cutting in half alternate rails on both sides of the railway line for 7 miles (11 km). The 18-arch Ashlar bridge at Asluj was also destroyed. Here, every second arch was blown up. Meanwhile, the Imperial Camel Brigade was delayed following the frontier line to Hafir el Auja. They arrived at 11:45 to begin demolitions along 13 miles (21 km) of railway line, including seven bridges.

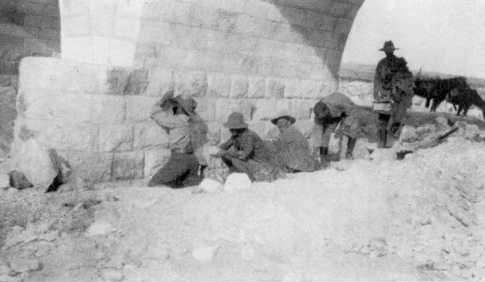
Laying the gun cotton charges at the base of a pier of the Asluj bridge

The led horses were followed by the two teams of dismounted demolition men moving in a single file at a walking pace. Setting the explosive charges began with the leading man placing a slab of gun cotton in the middle of a rail and then, missing a rail, to repeat his action, while the leading man of the second team put down a slab of gun cotton in the middle of the rail on his side which paired with the rail missed by the other team. The next man of both teams then wired the gun cotton to the rail and walked on to the next prepared rail, while the third man put into the gun cotton the detonator and fuse, and the fourth man lit the charge. Each squadron blasted a 12–15-inch (30–38 cm) piece of rail along the 5 miles (8.0 km). This way, about 15 miles (24 km) of railway line was destroyed. The bridges were wrecked by placing gun cotton charges on alternate arches and firing the charges electrically. All demolitions were complete by 13:00 when the units returned to their bivouacs.

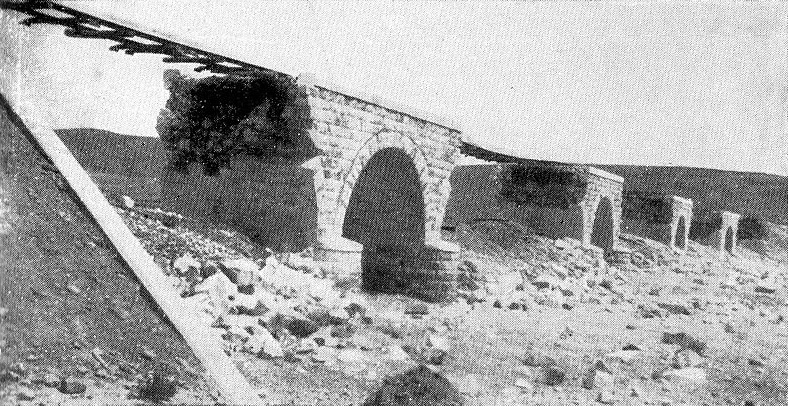
Eighteen Arch bridge at Asluj after demolition

The Imperial Camel Brigade fired the timed and instantaneous fuses together to destroy "[a]pproximately 7,600 yards (6,900 m) of single track (each rail being destroyed at centre) beginning about 1 mile (1.6 km) E of Auja and destroying rails to within 1 mile (1.6 km) of Wadi Abiad Bridge." The six-span bridge over the Wadi Husaniya was "totally demolished," while seven piers and eight arches of the twelve-span bridge over the Wadi Abiad were demolished. They continued working till 17:00 when they withdrew with their escorts.

Before noon on 23 May, 13 miles (21 km) of railway line and six bridges had been wrecked. The raid was completely successful. Both columns returned to their base without being attacked. A many-arched and substantial stone railway viaduct was demolished entirely with explosives, several miles of line being destroyed in the same way, thus isolating what remained intact of the railway to the south.

== Aftermath ==
All the demolition work was complete by Chaytor's column by 10:20 when they withdrew. By 14:20, their demolition teams and the 1st Light Horse Brigade were seen passing Hill 860 just north of Khalasa. After they cleared the line, the 2nd Light Horse Brigade began to drop back through Khalasa with the New Zealand Mounted Rifles Brigade covering the withdrawal to Esani, where the force watered and fed before riding back with the New Zealand Mounted Rifles Brigade as rearguard. The whole force marched back to the Tel el Fara camp. During the retirement, crops were burned by the 2nd Light Horse and the New Zealand Mounted Rifles Brigades, estimated to be 110m tons. Thirteen prisoners were captured. (Note: Yigal Sheffy suggests that the success of this raid, resulted in the change of focus for the next EEF offensive, from Gaza to Beersheba. [Y. Sheffy, The Origins of the British Breakthrough into South Palestine: The Anzac Raid on the Ottoman Railway, 1917 in Journal of Strategic Studies, Volume 22, Issue 1 March 1999, pages 124–147])

[W]e have just returned from an exciting two-day show. We rode out to a Turkish railway just beyond Beersheba, arrived there at dawn and blew about fourteen miles of it all to blazes besides three small bridges. Whether we took them by surprise or whether they were afraid of us, I don't know, but we met practically no opposition and got back safely the next night with hardly a casualty in the two divisions.

— Robert Wilson, Royal Berkshire Yeomanry 1/1st Berkshire Yeomanry, 6th Mounted Brigade, Imperial Mounted Division.
