= Balfour Declaration =

British government statement of 1917

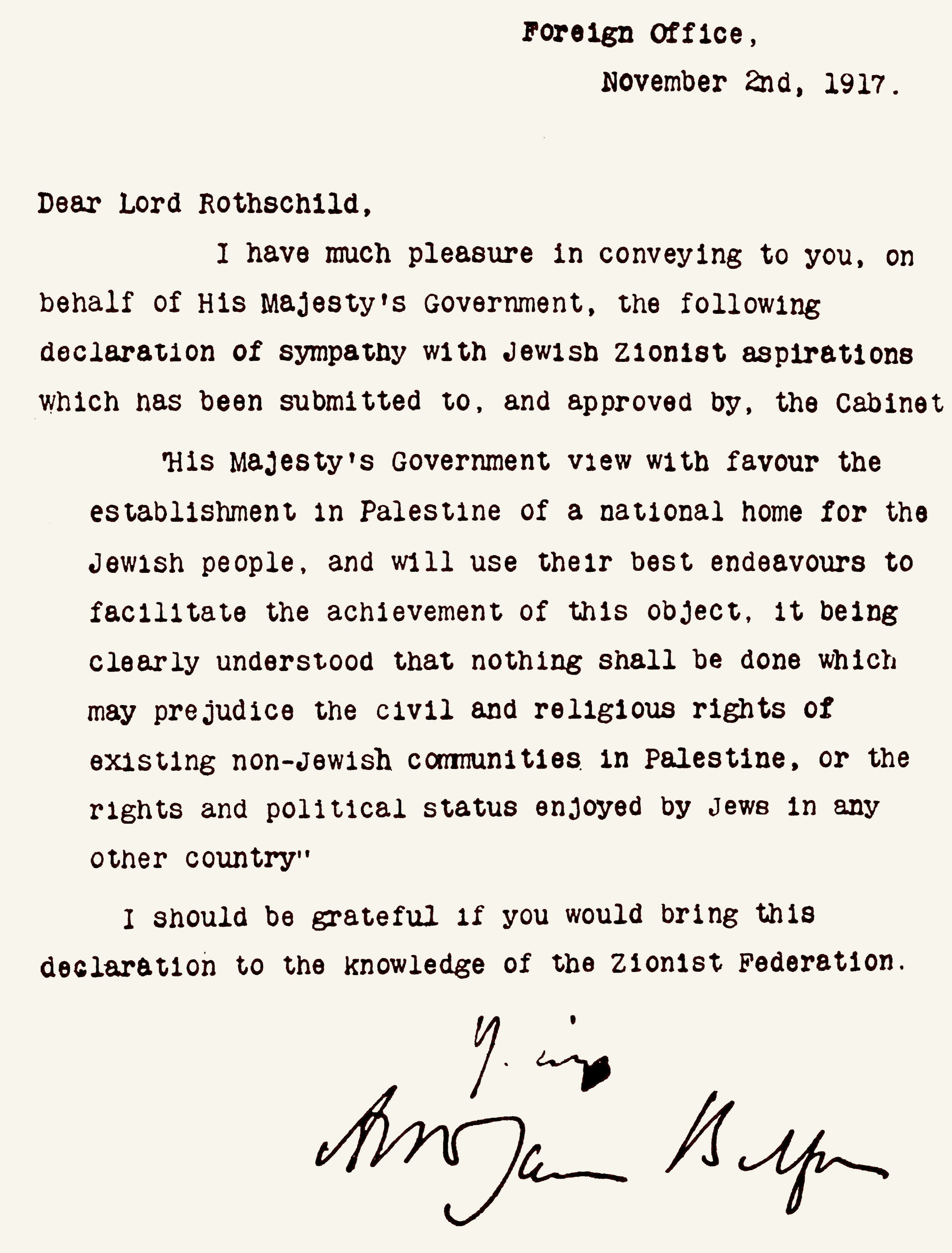
- The original letter from Balfour to Rothschild; the declaration reads: His Majesty's Government view with favour the establishment in Palestine of a national home for the Jewish people, and will use their best endeavours to facilitate the achievement of this object, it being clearly understood that nothing shall be done which may prejudice the civil and religious rights of existing non-Jewish communities in Palestine, or the rights and political status enjoyed by Jews in any other country.
- Created: 2 November 1917
- Location: British Library
- Author(s): Walter Rothschild, Arthur Balfour, Leo Amery, Lord Milner
- Signatories: Arthur James Balfour
- Purpose: Confirming support from the British government for the establishment in Palestine of a "national home" for the Jewish people, with two conditions

Full text
- Balfour Declaration at Wikisource

The Balfour Declaration (2 November 1917) was a public statement issued by the British Government in 1917 during the First World War announcing its support for the establishment of a "national home for the Jewish people" in Palestine, then an Ottoman region with a small Jewish minority among an overwhelming Arab majority, mostly Muslim but also including Christians. The declaration was contained in a letter dated 2 November 1917 from Arthur Balfour, the British foreign secretary, to Lord Rothschild, a leader of the British Jewish community, for transmission to the Zionist Federation of Great Britain and Ireland. The text of the declaration was published in the press on 9 November 1917.

Following Britain's declaration of war on the Ottoman Empire in November 1914, it had begun to consider the future of Palestine. Within two months a memorandum was circulated to the War Cabinet by a Zionist member, Herbert Samuel, proposing support of Zionist ambitions in order to gain the support of Jews in the current war. A committee was established in April 1915 by British prime minister H. H. Asquith to determine policy towards the Ottoman Empire including Palestine.

Asquith, who had favoured post-war reform of the Ottoman Empire, resigned in December 1916; his replacement David Lloyd George favoured partition of the Empire. The first negotiations between the British and the Zionists took place at a conference on 7 February 1917 that included Sir Mark Sykes and the Zionist leadership. Subsequent discussions led to Balfour's request, on 19 June, that Rothschild and Chaim Weizmann draft a public declaration. Further drafts were discussed by the British Cabinet during September and October, with input from Zionist and anti-Zionist Jews but with no representation from the large local Arab population in Palestine.

By late 1917, the wider war had reached a stalemate, with two of Britain's allies not fully engaged: the United States had yet to suffer a casualty, and the Russians were in the midst of a revolution. A stalemate in southern Palestine was broken by the Battle of Beersheba on 31 October 1917. The release of the final declaration was authorised on 31 October; the preceding Cabinet discussion had referred to perceived propaganda benefits amongst the worldwide Jewish community for the Allied war effort.

The opening words of the declaration represented the first public expression of support for Zionism by a major political power. The term "national home" had no precedent in international law, and was intentionally vague as to whether a Jewish state was contemplated. The intended boundaries of Palestine were not specified. The British government later confirmed that the words "in Palestine" meant that the Jewish national home was not intended to cover all of Palestine. The second half of the declaration was added to satisfy opponents of the policy, who had claimed that it would otherwise prejudice the position of the local population of Palestine and encourage antisemitism worldwide by "stamping the Jews as strangers in their native lands". The declaration called for safeguarding the civil and religious rights for the Palestinian Arabs, who composed the vast majority of the local population, and also the rights and political status of the Jewish communities in countries outside of Palestine.

The British government acknowledged in 1939 that the local population's wishes and interests should have been taken into account. In 2018 it recognised that the declaration should have called for the protection of the Palestinian Arabs' political rights.

The declaration greatly increased popular support for Zionism within Jewish communities worldwide. It became a core component of the British Mandate for Palestine, the founding document of Mandatory Palestine. It indirectly led to the emergence of the State of Israel. It is considered to be a principal cause of the ongoing Israeli–Palestinian conflict – often described as the most intractable in the world. Controversy remains over numerous issues, such as whether the declaration contradicted earlier promises the British had made to the Sharif of Mecca in the McMahon–Hussein correspondence.

== Background ==
=== Early British support ===
Early British political support for an increased Jewish presence in the region of Palestine was based upon geopolitical calculations. (Note: Renton described this as follows: "A crucial aspect of this depiction of the Declaration as a product of British benevolence, as opposed to realpolitik, was that the British had a natural and deep-rooted concern for the rights of Jews and specifically their national restoration, which was an ingrained part of British culture and history. Presented in this way, the Declaration was shown to be a natural, almost preordained event. Hence, Zionism was presented not just as the telos of Jewish history but also of British history. The tendency of nationalist and Zionist histories to develop towards a single point of destiny and redemption allowed for, indeed required, such an explanation. The myth of British 'proto-Zionism', which has had such a longstanding influence on the historiography of the Balfour Declaration, was thus produced, so as to serve the needs of Zionist propagandists working for the British Government.") This support began in the early 1840s and was led by Lord Palmerston, following the occupation of Syria and Palestine by separatist Ottoman governor Muhammad Ali of Egypt. French influence had grown in Palestine and the wider Middle East, and its role as protector of the Catholic communities began to grow, just as Russian influence had grown as protector of the Eastern Orthodox in the same regions. This left Britain without a sphere of influence, and thus a need to find or create their own regional "protégés". These political considerations were supported by a sympathetic evangelical Christian sentiment towards the "restoration of the Jews" to Palestine among elements of the mid-19th-century British political elite – most notably Lord Shaftesbury. (Note: Donald Lewis writes: "It is the contention of this work that only by understanding [Christian philosemitism and Christian Zionism] can one make sense of the religious and cultural influences that worked together to create a climate of opinion among the political elite in Britain that was well disposed to the Balfour Declaration.") The British Foreign Office actively encouraged Jewish emigration to Palestine, exemplified by Charles Henry Churchill's 1841–1842 exhortations to Moses Montefiore, the leader of the British Jewish community. (Note: Montefiore was the wealthiest British Jew, and leader of the Board of Deputies of British Jews. Charles Henry Churchill's first letter, in 1841, intended to catalyse an interest in Jewish emigration to Palestine: "Supposing that you and your colleagues should at once and earnestly interest yourselves upon this important subject of the recovery of your ancient country, it appears to me (forming my opinions upon the present attitude of affairs in the Turkish Empire) that it could only be as subjects of the Porte that you could commence to regain a footing in Palestine.")

Such efforts were premature, and did not succeed; (Note: With respect to European schemes to encourage Protestant, Catholic and Jewish immigration to Palestine, Schölch notes that "But of the many colonization projects and enterprises, only two had any success: the settlements of Templars[sic] since 1868 and those of Jewish immigrants since 1882.") only 24,000 Jews were living in Palestine on the eve of the emergence of Zionism within the world's Jewish communities in the last two decades of the 19th century. With the geopolitical shakeup occasioned by the outbreak of the First World War, the earlier calculations, which had lapsed for some time, led to a renewal of strategic assessments and political bargaining over the Middle and Far East.

==== British antisemitism ====
Although other factors played their part, historian Jonathan Schneer says that stereotypical thinking by British officials about Jews also played a role in the decision to issue the Declaration. Robert Cecil, Hugh O'Bierne and Sir Mark Sykes all held an unrealistic view of "world Jewry", the former writing "I do not think it is possible to exaggerate the international power of the Jews." Zionist representatives saw advantage in encouraging such views. James Renton concurs, writing that the British foreign policy elite, including Prime Minister David Lloyd George and Foreign Secretary A.J. Balfour, believed that Jews possessed real and significant power that could be of use to them in the war.

=== Early Zionism ===
Zionism arose in the late 19th century in reaction to anti-Semitic and exclusionary nationalist movements in Europe. (Note: LeVine and Mossberg describe this as follows: "The parents of Zionism were not Judaism and tradition, but anti-Semitism and nationalism. The ideals of the French Revolution spread slowly across Europe, finally reaching the Pale of Settlement in the Russian Empire and helping to set off the Haskalah, or Jewish Enlightenment. This engendered a permanent split in the Jewish world, between those who held to a halachic or religious-centric vision of their identity and those who adopted in part the racial rhetoric of the time and made the Jewish people into a nation. This was helped along by the wave of pogroms in Eastern Europe that set two million Jews to flight; most wound up in America, but some chose Palestine. A driving force behind this was the Hovevei Zion movement, which worked from 1882 to develop a Hebrew identity that was distinct from Judaism as a religion.") (Note: Gelvin wrote: "The fact that Palestinian nationalism developed later than Zionism and indeed in response to it does not in any way diminish the legitimacy of Palestinian nationalism or make it less valid than Zionism. All nationalisms arise in opposition to some 'other'. Why else would there be the need to specify who you are? And all nationalisms are defined by what they oppose. As we have seen, Zionism itself arose in reaction to anti-Semitic and exclusionary nationalist movements in Europe. It would be perverse to judge Zionism as somehow less valid than European anti-Semitism or those nationalisms. Furthermore, Zionism itself was also defined by its opposition to the indigenous Palestinian inhabitants of the region. Both the 'conquest of land' and the 'conquest of labor' slogans that became central to the dominant strain of Zionism in the Yishuv originated as a result of the Zionist confrontation with the Palestinian 'other'.") Romantic nationalism in Central and Eastern Europe had helped to set off the Haskalah, or "Jewish Enlightenment", creating a split in the Jewish community between those who saw Judaism as their religion and those who saw it as their ethnicity or nation. The 1881–1884 anti-Jewish pogroms in the Russian Empire encouraged the growth of the latter identity, resulting in the formation of the Hovevei Zion pioneer organizations, the publication of Leon Pinsker's Autoemancipation, and the first major wave of Jewish immigration to Palestine – retrospectively named the "First Aliyah".

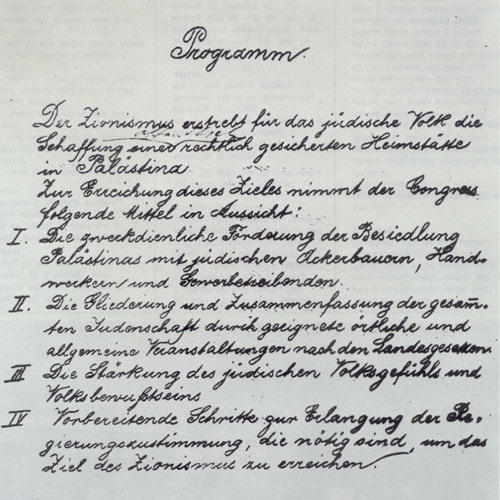
The "Basel program" approved at the 1897 First Zionist Congress. The first line states: "Zionism seeks to establish a home (Heimstätte) for the Jewish people in Palestine secured under public law"

In 1896, Theodor Herzl, a Jewish journalist living in Austria-Hungary, published the foundational text of political Zionism, Der Judenstaat ("The Jews' State" or "The State of the Jews"), in which he asserted that the only solution to the "Jewish Question" in Europe, including growing anti-Semitism, was the establishment of a state for the Jews. A year later, Herzl founded the Zionist Organization, which at its first congress called for the establishment of "a home for the Jewish people in Palestine secured under public law". Proposed measures to attain that goal included the promotion of Jewish settlement there, the organisation of Jews in the diaspora, the strengthening of Jewish feeling and consciousness, and preparatory steps to attain necessary governmental grants. Herzl died in 1904, 44 years before the establishment of State of Israel, the Jewish state that he proposed, without having gained the political standing required to carry out his agenda.

Zionist leader Chaim Weizmann, later President of the World Zionist Organisation and first President of Israel, moved from Switzerland to the UK in 1904 and met Arthur Balfour – who had just launched his 1905–1906 election campaign after resigning as Prime Minister – in a session arranged by Charles Dreyfus, his Jewish constituency representative. (Note: Defries wrote: "Balfour had, at the least, acquiesced in Chamberlain's earlier efforts to assist the Jews in finding a territory to establish a Jewish settlement. According to his biographer he was interested enough in Zionism at the end of 1905 to allow his Jewish constituency party chairman, Charles Dreyfus, to organise a meeting with Weizmann. It is possible that he was intrigued by the rejection by the Zionist Congress of the 'Uganda' offer. It is unlikely that Balfour was 'converted' to Zionism by this encounter despite this view being propounded by Weizmann and endorsed by Balfour's biographer. Balfour had just resigned as prime minister when he met Weizmann.") Earlier that year, Balfour had successfully driven the Aliens Act through Parliament with impassioned speeches regarding the need to restrict the wave of immigration into Britain from Jews fleeing the Russian Empire. During this meeting, he asked what Weizmann's objections had been to the 1903 Uganda Scheme that Herzl had supported to provide a portion of British East Africa to the Jewish people as a homeland. The scheme, which had been proposed to Herzl by Joseph Chamberlain, Colonial Secretary in Balfour's Cabinet, following his trip to East Africa earlier in the year, (Note: Rovner wrote: "In the spring of 1903 the fastidiously dressed sixty-six-year-old secretary was fresh from a trip to British possessions in Africa ... Whatever the genesis of the idea, Chamberlain received Herzl in his office just weeks after the Kishinev pogroms. He fixed Herzl in his monocle and offered his help. "I have seen a land for you on my travels," Chamberlain told him, "and that's Uganda. It's not on the coast, but farther inland the climate becomes excellent even for Europeans… [a]nd I thought to myself that would be a land for Dr. Herzl." ") had been subsequently voted down following Herzl's death by the Seventh Zionist Congress in 1905 (Note: Rovner wrote: "On the afternoon of the fourth day of the Congress a weary Nordau brought three resolutions before the delegates: (1) that the Zionist Organization direct all future settlement efforts solely to Palestine; (2) that the Zionist Organization thank the British government for its offer of an autonomous territory in East Africa; and (3) that only those Jews who declare their allegiance to the Basel Program may become members of the Zionist Organization." Zangwill objected… When Nordau insisted on the Congress's right to pass the resolutions regardless, Zangwill was outraged. "You will be charged before the bar of history," he challenged Nordau… From approximately 1:30 p.m. on Sunday, July 30, 1905, a Zionist would henceforth be defined as someone who adhered to the Basel Program and the only "authentic interpretation" of that program restricted settlement activity exclusively to Palestine. Zangwill and his supporters could not accept Nordau's "authentic interpretation" which they believed would lead to an abandonment of the Jewish masses and of Herzl's vision. One territorialist claimed that Ussishkin's voting bloc had in fact "buried political Zionism".") after two years of heated debate in the Zionist Organization. Weizmann responded that he believed the English are to London as the Jews are to Jerusalem. (Note: According to Weizmann's memoir, the conversation went as follows: "Mr. Balfour, supposing I was to offer you Paris instead of London, would you take it?" He sat up, looked at me, and answered: "But Dr. Weizmann, we have London." "That is true," I said, "but we had Jerusalem when London was a marsh." He ... said two things which I remember vividly. The first was: "Are there many Jews who think like you?" I answered: "I believe I speak the mind of millions of Jews whom you will never see and who cannot speak for themselves." ... To this he said: "If that is so you will one day be a force." Shortly before I withdrew, Balfour said: "It is curious. The Jews I meet are quite different." I answered: "Mr. Balfour, you meet the wrong kind of Jews".)

In January 1914, Weizmann first met Baron Edmond de Rothschild, a member of the French branch of the Rothschild family and a leading proponent of the Zionist movement, in relation to a project to build a Hebrew university in Jerusalem. The Baron was not part of the World Zionist Organization, but had funded the Jewish agricultural colonies of the First Aliyah and transferred them to the Jewish Colonization Association in 1899. This connection was to bear fruit later that year when the Baron's son, James de Rothschild, requested a meeting with Weizmann on 25 November 1914, to enlist him in influencing those deemed to be receptive within the British government to the Zionist agenda in Palestine. (Note: Weizmann's notes of the meeting described that: "[James] thought that the Palestinian aspirations of the Jews will find a very favourable response in Government circles, which would support a project like that, both from a humanitarian and an English political point of view. The formation of a strong Jewish community in Palestine would be considered as a valuable political asset. He therefore thought that the demands which only amount to asking for an encouragement of colonization of Jews in Palestine are too modest and would not appeal sufficiently strongly to Statesmen. One should ask for something which is more than that and which tends towards the formation of a Jewish State." Gutwein interpreted this discussion as follows: "James's recommendation that the Zionists should not stop at the demand for settlement of Jews in Palestine, but radicalize their demands for a Jewish state, reflected the political contrast between the reformists, who were prepared to support settlement of Jews in Palestine as part of the reorganization of the Ottoman Empire, and the radicals, who viewed a Jewish state as a means of partitioning it. Although James contended that the demand for a Jewish state would help in gaining the British statesmen's support, in view of Asquith's and Grey's opposition to this demand, it seems that the inaccuracy if not the misleading tenor of James's advice was meant to enlist Weizmann, and through him the Zionist movement, to assist the radicals and Lloyd George.") Through James's wife Dorothy, Weizmann was to meet Rózsika Rothschild, who introduced him to the English branch of the family – in particular her husband Charles and his older brother Walter, a zoologist and former Member of Parliament (MP). Their father, Nathan Rothschild, 1st Baron Rothschild, head of the English branch of the family, had a guarded attitude towards Zionism, but he died in March 1915 and his title was inherited by Walter.

Prior to the declaration, about 8,000 of Britain's 300,000 Jews belonged to a Zionist organisation. Globally, as of 1913 – the latest known date prior to the declaration – the equivalent figure was approximately 1%.

=== Ottoman Palestine ===
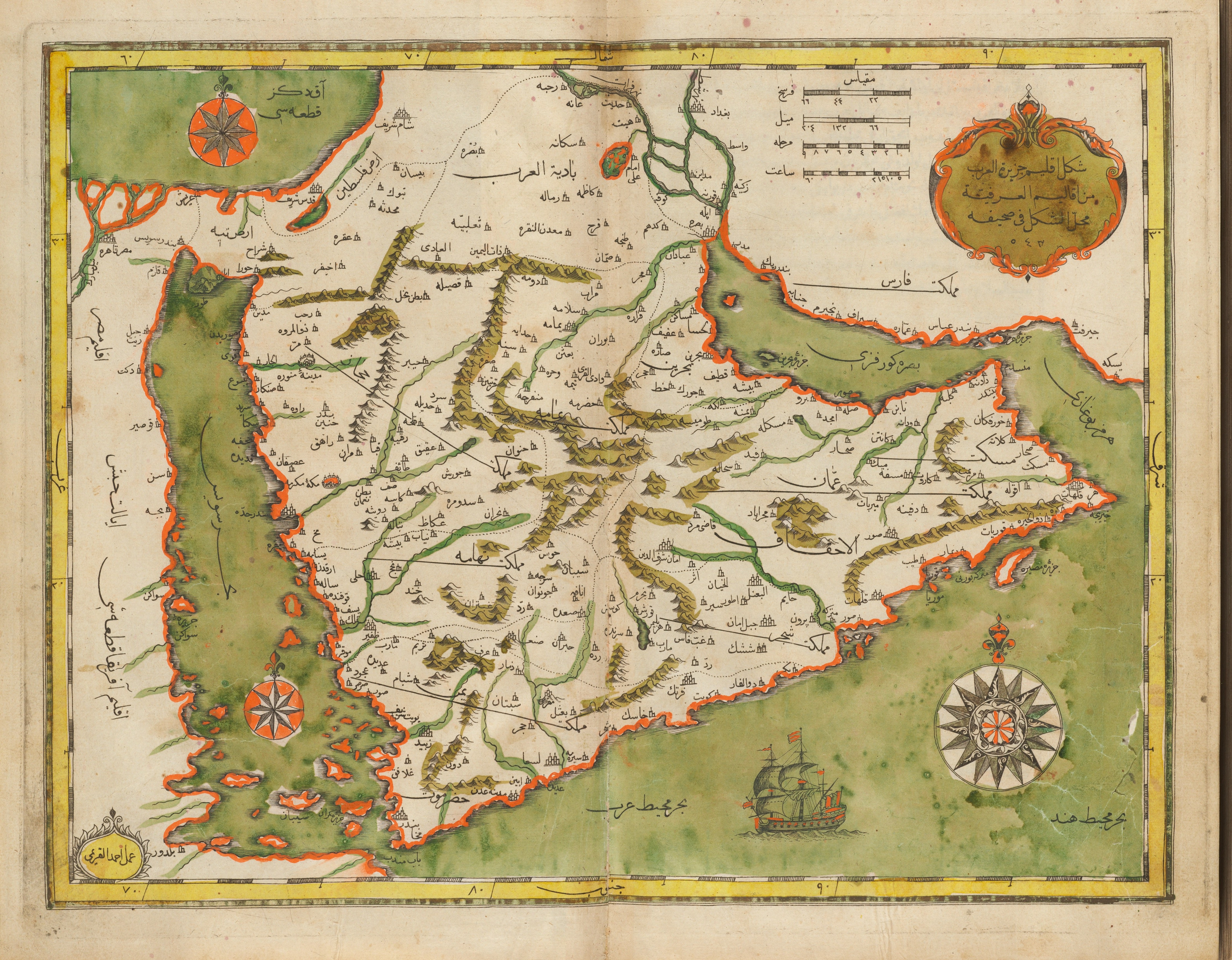
Published in 1732, this map by Ottoman geographer Kâtip Çelebi (1609–57) shows the term ارض فلسطين (ʾarḍ Filasṭīn, "Land of Palestine") extending vertically down the length of the Jordan River.

The year 1916 marked four centuries since Palestine had become part of the Ottoman Empire, also known as the Turkish Empire. For most of this period, the Jewish population represented a small minority, approximately 3% of the total, with Muslims representing the largest segment of the population, and Christians the second. (Note: Yonathan Mendel writes: The exact percentage of Jews in Palestine prior to the rise of Zionism and waves of aliyah is unknown. However, it probably ranged from 2 to 5 per cent. According to Ottoman records, a total population of 462,465 resided in 1878 in what is today Israel/Palestine. Of this number, 403,795 (87 per cent) were Muslim, 43,659 (10 per cent) were Christian and 15,011 (3 per cent) were Jewish (quoted in Alan Dowty, Israel/Palestine, Cambridge: Polity, 2008, p. 13). See also Mark Tessler, A History of the Israeli–Palestinian Conflict (Bloomington, IN: Indiana University Press, 1994), pp. 43 and 124.)

Ottoman government in Constantinople began to apply restrictions on Jewish immigration to Palestine in late 1882, in response to the start of the First Aliyah earlier that year. Although this immigration was creating a certain amount of tension with the local population, mainly among the merchant and notable classes, in 1901 the Sublime Porte (the Ottoman central government) gave Jews the same rights as Arabs to buy land in Palestine and the percentage of Jews in the population rose to 7% by 1914. At the same time, with growing distrust of the Young Turks (Turkish nationalists who had taken control of the Empire in 1908) and the Second Aliyah, Arab nationalism and Palestinian nationalism was on the rise; and in Palestine anti-Zionism was a characteristic that unified these forces. Historians cannot say whether these strengthening forces would still have ultimately resulted in conflict in the absence of the Balfour Declaration. (Note: Schneer noted that: "The Balfour Declaration was not, in and of itself, the source of trouble in a land that previously had been more or less at peace, but nor was it a mere signpost on a road heading undivertibly toward a cliff. No one can say what the course of events in Palestine might have been without it. What did come was the product of forces and factors entirely unforeseen.")

=== First World War ===
==== 1914–1916: Initial Zionist–British Government discussions ====
In July 1914, war broke out in Europe between the Triple Entente (Britain, France, and the Russian Empire) and the Central Powers (Germany, Austria-Hungary, and, later that year, the Ottoman Empire).

The British Cabinet first discussed Palestine at a meeting on 9 November 1914, four days after Britain's declaration of war on the Ottoman Empire, of which the Mutasarrifate of Jerusalem – often referred to as Palestine – was a component. At the meeting David Lloyd George, then Chancellor of the Exchequer, "referred to the ultimate destiny of Palestine". The Chancellor, whose law firm Lloyd George, Roberts and Co had been engaged a decade before by the Zionist Federation of Great Britain and Ireland to work on the Uganda Scheme, was to become prime minister by the time of the declaration, and was ultimately responsible for it.

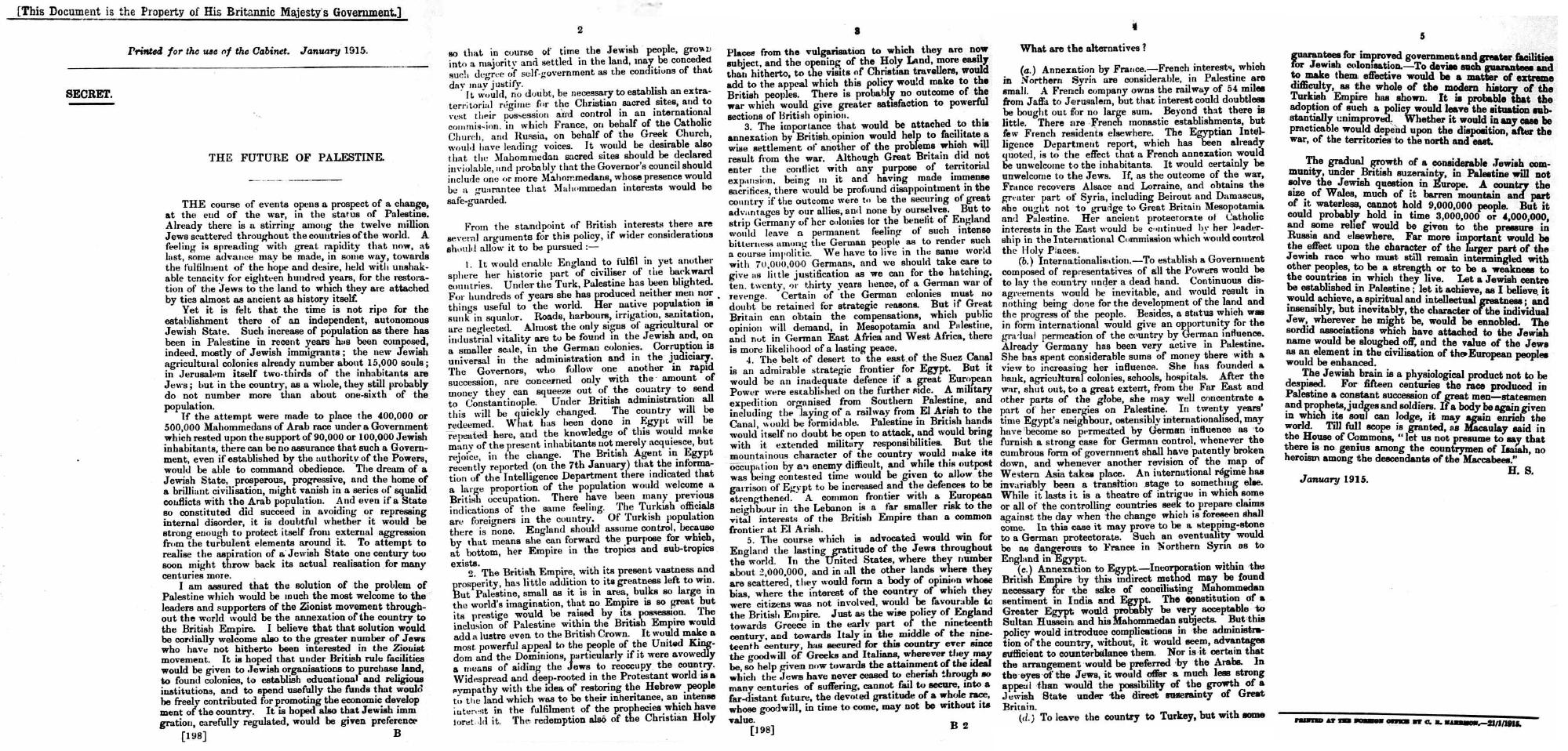
Herbert Samuel's Cabinet memorandum, The Future of Palestine, as published in the British Cabinet papers (CAB 37/123/43), as at 21 January 1915

Weizmann's political efforts picked up speed, (Note: From Weizmann's memoirs: "The entry of Turkey into the fray and the remarks made by the Premier in his Guildhall speech were an additional impulse towards proceeding with the reconnoitring work at a higher speed ... An opportunity offered itself to discuss the Jewish problems with Mr. C. P. Scott (Editor of the Manchester Guardian)… Mr. Scott, who has, I believe, given the whole problem a very careful and sympathetic attention, was good enough to promise that he would talk to Mr. Lloyd George on the subject ... As it happened, Mr. Lloyd George, having several engagements for the week suggested that I should see Mr. Herbert Samuel, and an interview took place at his office. [Footnote: 10 Dec. 1914]") and on 10 December 1914 he met with Herbert Samuel, a British Cabinet member and a secular Jew who had studied Zionism; Samuel believed Weizmann's demands were too modest. (Note: Weizmann's memoirs: "He believed that my demands were too modest, that big things would have to be done in Palestine; he himself would move and would expect Jewry to move immediately the military situation was cleared up ... The Jews would have to bring sacrifices and he was prepared to do so. At this point I ventured to ask in which way the plans of Mr. Samuel were more ambitious than mine. Mr. Samuel preferred not to enter into a discussion of his plans, as he would like to keep them 'liquid', but he suggested that the Jews would have to build railways, harbours, a university, a network of schools, etc. ... He also thinks that perhaps the Temple may be rebuilt, as a symbol of Jewish unity, of course, in a modernised form.") Two days later, Weizmann met Balfour again, for the first time since their initial meeting in 1905; Balfour had been out of government ever since his electoral defeat in 1906, but remained a senior member of the Conservative Party in their role as Official Opposition. (Note: Again from Weizmann's memoirs: "On the suggestion of Baron James, I went to see Sir Philip Magnus with whom I had a lengthy conversation, and he expressed his willingness to cooperate, provided that great discretion was used ... I asked Sir Philip his opinion of the advisability of seeing Mr. Balfour, and he thought that an interview with Mr. Balfour would be of very great interest and value ... At one of my visits to London I wrote to Mr. Balfour and got an appointment with him on Saturday the same week at 12 o'clock in his house.[Footnote: 12 Dec. 1914] I spoke to him practically in the same strain as I did to Mr. Samuel, but the whole turn of our conversation was more academic than practical.")

A month later, Samuel circulated a memorandum entitled The Future of Palestine to his Cabinet colleagues. The memorandum stated: "I am assured that the solution of the problem of Palestine which would be much the most welcome to the leaders and supporters of the Zionist movement throughout the world would be the annexation of the country to the British Empire". Samuel discussed a copy of his memorandum with Nathan Rothschild in February 1915, a month before the latter's death. It was the first time in an official record that enlisting the support of Jews as a war measure had been proposed.

Many further discussions followed, including the initial meetings in 1915–16 between Lloyd George, who had been appointed Minister of Munitions in May 1915, and Weizmann, who was appointed as a scientific advisor to the ministry in September 1915. Seventeen years later, in his War Memoirs, Lloyd George described these meetings as being the "fount and origin" of the declaration; historians have rejected this claim. (Note: Weizmann had been asked to produce a new process for the production of acetone in order to reduce the cost of cordite production; the popular suggestion that this role influenced the decision to release the declaration has been described as "fanciful", a "legend", a "myth", and "a product of [Lloyd George's] imagination". From Lloyd George's War Memoirs, which created this myth: "But by the spring of 1915 the position in the American acetone market had become extremely delicate ... In the survey we made of all the various prospective requirements, it soon became clear that the supplies of wood alcohol for the manufacture of acetone would prove quite insufficient to meet the increasing demands, particularly in 1916 ... While I was casting about for some solution of the difficulty, I ran against the late C. P. Scott, Editor of the Manchester Guardian ... I took his word about Professor Weizmann and invited him to London to see me ... He could produce acetone by a fermentation process on a laboratory scale, but it would require some time before he could guarantee successful production on a manufacturing scale. In a few weeks' time he came to me and said: "The problem is solved."... When our difficulties were solved through Dr. Weizmann's genius I said to him: 'You have rendered great service to the State, and I should like to ask the Prime Minister to recommend you to His Majesty for some honour.' He said: 'There is nothing I want for myself.' 'But is there nothing we can do as a recognition of your valuable assistance to the country?' I asked. He replied: 'Yes, I would like you to do something for my people.' He then explained his aspirations as to the repatriation of the Jews to the sacred land they had made famous. That was the fount and origin of the famous declaration about the National Home for Jews in Palestine. As soon as I became Prime Minister I talked the whole matter over with Mr. Balfour, who was then Foreign Secretary. As a scientist he was immensely interested when I told him of Dr. Weizmann's achievement. We were anxious at that time to gather Jewish support in neutral countries, notably in America. Dr. Weizmann was brought into direct contact with the Foreign Secretary. This was the beginning of an association, the outcome of which, after long examination, was the famous Balfour Declaration ...")

==== 1915–1916: Prior British commitments over Palestine ====
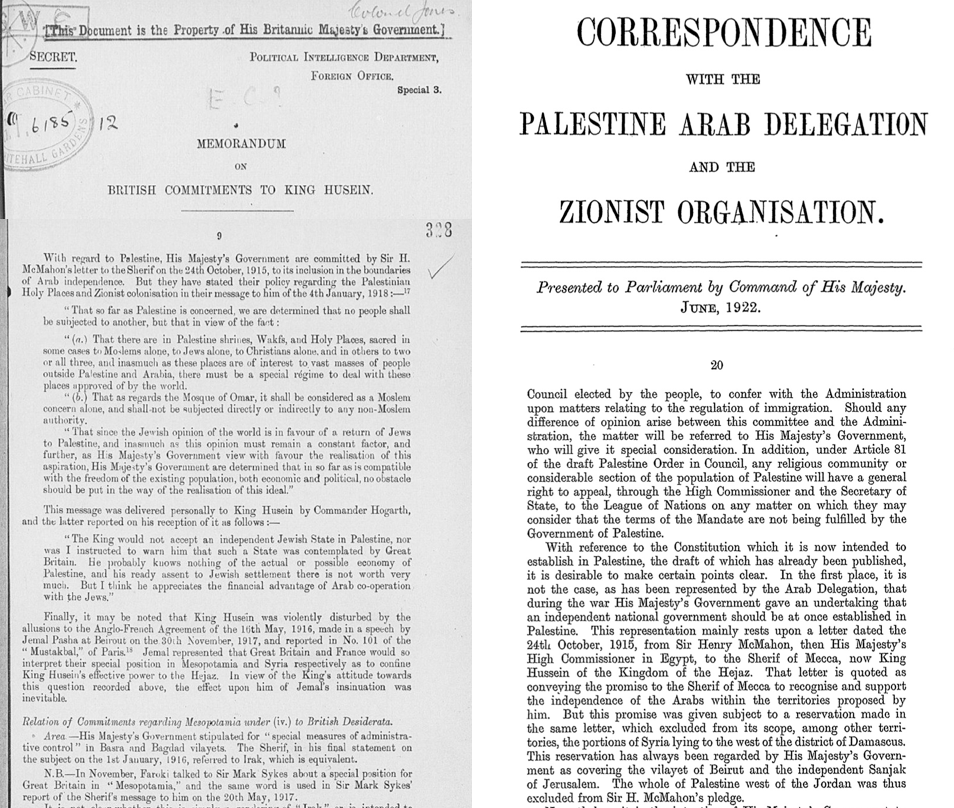
Excerpts from CAB 24/68/86 (Nov. 1918) and the Churchill White Paper (June 1922)

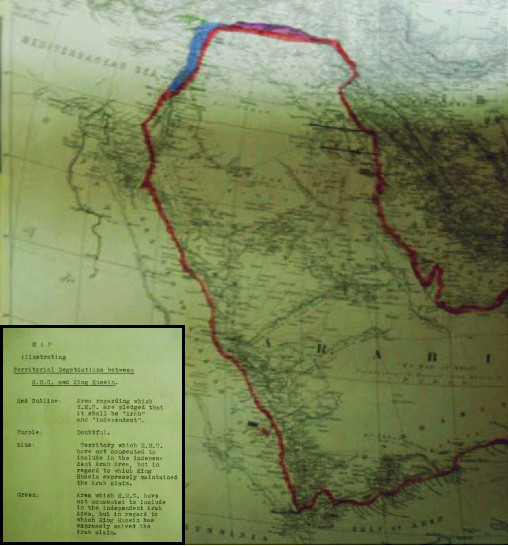
Map from FO 371/4368 (Nov. 1918) showing Palestine in the "Arab" area

The Cabinet document states that Palestine was included in the McMahon pledge to the Arabs, whereas the White Paper states that it "has always been regarded" as being excluded. (Note: Kedourie described the White Paper's 1922 statement as: "... the untruth that the government had 'always' regarded McMahon's reservation as covering the vilayet of Beirut and the sanjaq of Jerusalem, since in fact this argument was no older than Young's memorandum of November 1920")

In late 1915 the British High Commissioner to Egypt, Henry McMahon, exchanged ten letters with Hussein bin Ali, Sharif of Mecca, in which he promised Hussein to recognize Arab independence "in the limits and boundaries proposed by the Sherif of Mecca" in return for Hussein launching a revolt against the Ottoman Empire. The pledge excluded "portions of Syria" lying to the west of "the districts of Damascus, Homs, Hama and Aleppo". (Note: See the original 25 October 1915 letter here. George Antonius – who had been the first to publish the correspondence in full – described this letter as "by far the most important in the whole correspondence, and may perhaps be regarded as the most important international document in the history of the Arab national movement ... is still invoked as the main piece of evidence on which the Arabs accuse Great Britain of having broken faith with them.") In the decades after the war, the extent of this coastal exclusion was hotly disputed since Palestine lay to the southwest of Damascus and was not explicitly mentioned.

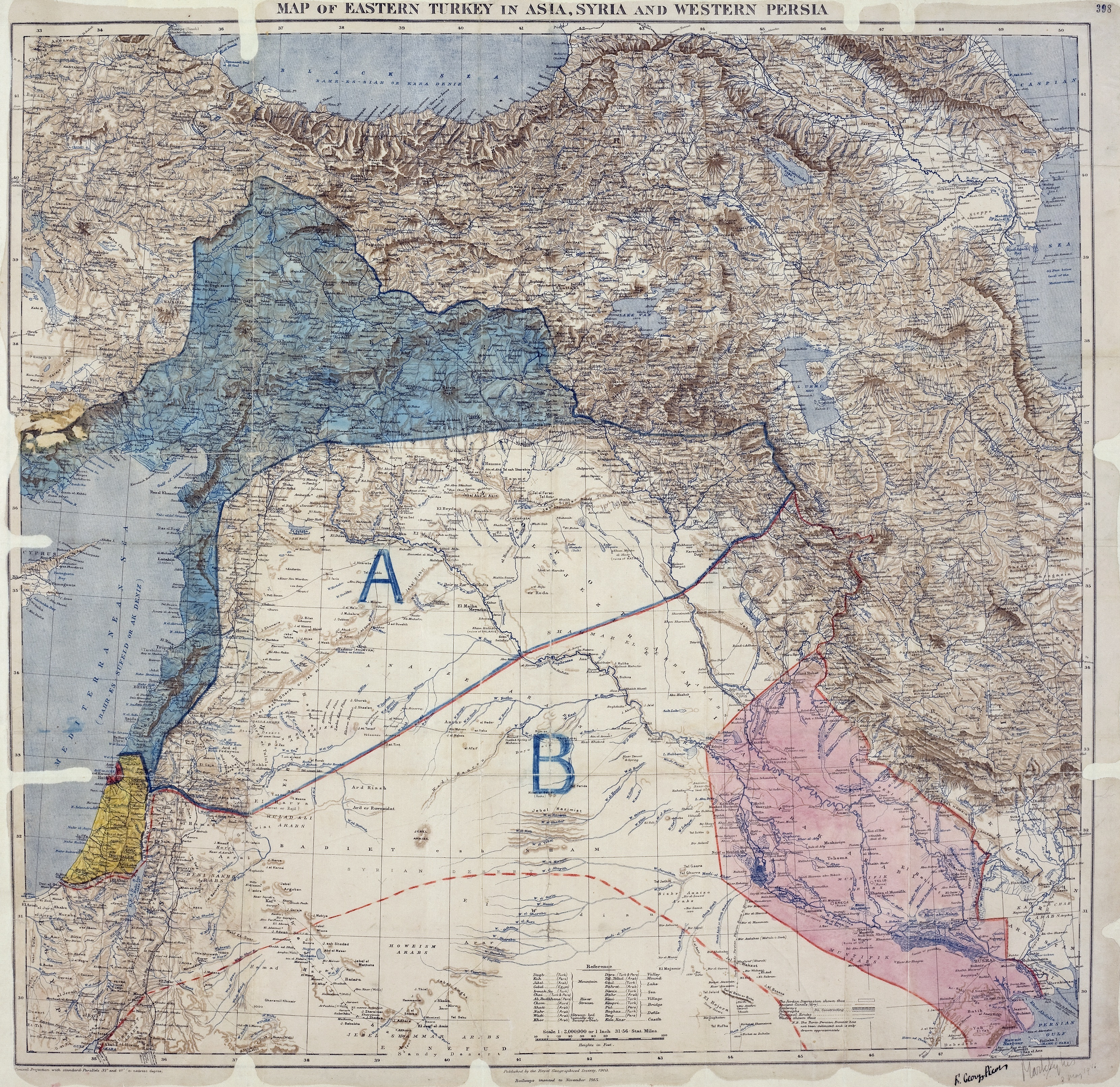
Palestine in the Sykes–Picot Agreement map under "international administration", with Haifa Bay, Acre and Haifa as a British enclave, and excluding the area from Hebron south (Note: In a 27 February 1916 letter, prior to his departure to Russia, Sykes wrote to Samuel: "I read [your 1915] memorandum and have committed it to memory." With respect to the borders, Sykes explained: "By excluding Hebron and the East of the Jordan there is less to discuss with the Moslems, as the Mosque of Omar then becomes the only matter of vital importance to discuss with them and further does away with any contact with the bedouins, who never cross the river except on business. I imagine that the principal object of Zionism is the realization of the ideal of an existing centre of nationality rather than boundaries or extent of territory.")

The Arab Revolt was launched on June 5th, 1916, on the basis of the quid pro quo agreement in the correspondence. However, less than three weeks earlier the governments of the United Kingdom, France, and Russia secretly concluded the Sykes–Picot Agreement, which Balfour described later as a "wholly new method" for dividing the region, after the 1915 agreement "seems to have been forgotten". (Note: In his August 1919 memo Balfour noted, "In 1915 it was the Sherif of Mecca to whom the task of delimitation was to have been confided, nor were any restrictions placed upon his discretion in this matter, except certain reservations intended to protect French interests in Western Syria and Cilicia. In 1916 all this seems to have been forgotten. The Sykes–Picot Agreement made no reference to the Sherif of Mecca, and, so far as our five documents are concerned, he has never been heard of since. A wholly new method was adopted by France and England, who made with each other in the Sykes–Picot Agreement the rough and ready territorial arrangements already described—arrangements which the Allied and Associated Powers have so far neither explicitly accepted nor explicitly replaced.")

This Anglo-French treaty was negotiated in late 1915 and early 1916 between Sir Mark Sykes and François Georges-Picot, with the primary arrangements being set out in draft form in a joint memorandum on 5 January 1916. Sykes was a British Conservative MP who had risen to a position of significant influence on Britain's Middle East policy, beginning with his seat on the 1915 De Bunsen Committee and his initiative to create the Arab Bureau. Picot was a French diplomat and former consul-general in Beirut. Their agreement defined the proposed spheres of influence and control in Western Asia should the Triple Entente succeed in defeating the Ottoman Empire during World War I, dividing many Arab territories into British- and French-administered areas. In Palestine, internationalisation was proposed, with the form of administration to be confirmed after consultation with both Russia and Hussein; the January draft noted Christian and Muslim interests, and that "members of the Jewish community throughout the world have a conscientious and sentimental interest in the future of the country." (Note: Sykes had discussed the matter with Picot, suggesting the creation of an Arab Sultanate of Palestine under French and British protection; he was reprimanded by Grey, Buchanan should tell Sykes 'to obliterate from his memory that Mr Samuel's Cabinet memorandum made any mention of a British protectorate and that I told Mr Samuel at the time that a British protectorate was quite out of the question and Sir M. Sykes should never mention the subject without making this clear'.)

Prior to this point, no active negotiations with Zionists had taken place, but Sykes had been aware of Zionism, was in contact with Moses Gaster – a former President of the English Zionist Federation – and may have seen Samuel's 1915 memorandum. On 3 March, while Sykes and Picot were still in Petrograd, Lucien Wolf (secretary of the Foreign Conjoint Committee, set up by Jewish organizations to further the interests of foreign Jews) submitted to the Foreign Office, the draft of an assurance (formula) that could be issued by the allies in support of Jewish aspirations:

In the event of Palestine coming within the spheres of influence of Great Britain or France at the close of the war, the governments of those powers will not fail to take account of the historic interest that country possesses for the Jewish community. The Jewish population will be secured in the enjoyment of civil and religious liberty, equal political rights with the rest of the population, reasonable facilities for immigration and colonisation, and such municipal privileges in the towns and colonies inhabited by them as may be shown to be necessary.

On 11 March, telegrams (Note: The full text of the telegram to Sazonov may be found in Jeffries) were sent in Grey's name to Britain's Russian and French ambassadors for transmission to Russian and French authorities, including the formula, as well as:

The scheme might be made far more attractive to the majority of Jews if it held out to them the prospect that when in course of time the Jewish colonists in Palestine grow strong enough to cope with the Arab population they may be allowed to take the management of the internal affairs of Palestine (with the exception of Jerusalem and the holy places) into their own hands.

Sykes, having seen the telegram, had discussions with Picot and proposed (making reference to Samuel's memorandum (Note: In ascertaining what Zionists will accept and what refuse I am guided by your telegram coupled with my memory of Mr Samuel's memorandum to the Cabinet in March 1915. Telegram say international regime unacceptable memorandum says French dominion equally unacceptable. As against this [? French omitted] [If Picot represents them correctly] would never consent to England having temporary or provisional charge of Palestine; not even if we offered Cyprus as a gift and appointed French Governor for Jerusalem Bethlehem Nazareth and Jaffa. They seem hardly normal on this subject and any reference seems to excite memories of all grievances from Joan of Arc to Fashoda)) the creation of an Arab Sultanate under French and British protection, some means of administering the holy places along with the establishment of a company to purchase land for Jewish colonists, who would then become citizens with equal rights to Arabs. (Note: Sykes was reprimanded by Grey, Buchanan should tell Sykes 'to obliterate from his memory that Mr Samuel's Cabinet memorandum made any mention of a British protectorate and that I told Mr Samuel at the time that a British protectorate was quite out of the question and Sir M. Sykes should never mention the subject without making this clear'.)

Shortly after returning from Petrograd, Sykes briefed Samuel, who then briefed a meeting of Gaster, Weizmann and Sokolow. Gaster recorded in his diary on 16 April 1916: "We are offered French-English condominium in Palest[ine]. Arab Prince to conciliate Arab sentiment and as part of the Constitution a Charter to Zionists for which England would stand guarantee and which would stand by us in every case of friction ... It practically comes to a complete realisation of our Zionist programme. However, we insisted on: national character of Charter, freedom of immigration and internal autonomy, and at the same time full rights of citizenship to [illegible] and Jews in Palestine." In Sykes's mind, the agreement which bore his name was outdated even before it was signed – in March 1916, he wrote in a private letter: "to my mind the Zionists are now the key of the situation". (Note: On his return from Petrograd, following his reprimand, Sykes wrote to Sir Arthur Nicholson "I am afraid from your telegram that I have caused you some uneasiness in regard to Picot & Palestine. But I can assure you no harm has been done, P is in the highest spirits over his new Castle in Armenia, and S[azonow] is apparently delighted to get out of having to take over any more Armenians than he can help. To my mind the Zionists are now the key of the situation-the problem is how are they to be satisfied?...." The full text of this letter may be found at) In the event, neither the French nor the Russians were enthusiastic about the proposed formulation and eventually on 4 July, Wolf was informed that "the present moment is inopportune for making any announcement."

These wartime initiatives, inclusive of the declaration, are frequently considered together by historians because of the potential, real or imagined, for incompatibility between them, particularly in regard to the disposition of Palestine. In the words of Professor Albert Hourani, founder of the Middle East Centre at St Antony's College, Oxford: "The argument about the interpretation of these agreements is one which is impossible to end, because they were intended to bear more than one interpretation."

==== 1916–1917: Change in British government ====
In terms of British politics, the declaration resulted from the coming into power of Lloyd George and his Cabinet, which had replaced the H. H. Asquith led-Cabinet in December 1916. Whilst both Prime Ministers were Liberals and both governments were wartime coalitions, Lloyd George and Balfour, appointed as his Foreign Secretary, favoured a post-war partition of the Ottoman Empire as a major British war aim, whereas Asquith and his Foreign Secretary, Sir Edward Grey, had favoured its reform.

Two days after taking office, Lloyd George told General Robertson, the Chief of the Imperial General Staff, that he wanted a major victory, preferably the capture of Jerusalem, to impress British public opinion, and immediately consulted his War Cabinet about a "further campaign into Palestine when El Arish had been secured." Subsequent pressure from Lloyd George, over the reservations of Robertson, resulted in the recapture of the Sinai for British-controlled Egypt, and, with the capture of El Arish in December 1916 and Rafah in January 1917, the arrival of British forces at the southern borders of the Ottoman Empire. Following two unsuccessful attempts to capture Gaza between 26 March and 19 April, a six-month stalemate in Southern Palestine began; the Sinai and Palestine Campaign would not make any progress into Palestine until 31 October 1917.

==== 1917: British–Zionist formal negotiations ====
Following the change in government, Sykes was promoted into the War Cabinet Secretariat with responsibility for Middle Eastern affairs. In January 1917, despite having previously built a relationship with Moses Gaster, (Note: In most narratives, including that of Schneer, Gaster's role in bringing about the declaration has been dealt with dismissively. Attempt have been made by scholars, including James Renton, to rehabilitate his role.) he began looking to meet other Zionist leaders; by the end of the month he had been introduced to Weizmann and his associate Nahum Sokolow, a journalist and executive of the World Zionist Organization who had moved to Britain at the beginning of the war. (Note: Sykes was introduced to Weizmann and Sokolow via James Aratoon Malcolm, a British Armenian businessman, and L. J. Greenberg, the editor of the Jewish Chronicle.)

On 7 February 1917, Sykes, claiming to be acting in a private capacity, entered into substantive discussions with the Zionist leadership. (Note: Nahum Sokolow described the meeting in 1919 as follows: "The 7th of February 1917, constitutes a turning-point in the history ... At the commencement of the year 1917 Sir Mark Sykes entered into closer relations with Dr. Weizmann and the author, and the discussions held with the latter led to the meeting of February 7th, 1917, which marks the commencement of official negotiations. Besides Sir Mark Sykes, the following took part in this meeting: Lord Rothschild, Mr. Herbert Bentwich, Mr. Joseph Cowen, Dr. M. Gaster (at whose house the meeting took place), Mr. James de Rothschild, Mr. Harry Sacher, Right Hon. Herbert Samuel, M.P., Dr. Chaim Weizmann, and the author. The deliberations yielded a favourable result, and it was resolved to continue the work.") The previous British correspondence with "the Arabs" was discussed at the meeting; Sokolow's notes record Sykes's description that "The Arabs professed that language must be the measure [by which control of Palestine should be determined] and [by that measure] could claim all Syria and Palestine. Still the Arabs could be managed, particularly if they received Jewish support in other matters." (Note: Sykes had also informed the Zionists he was meeting Picot the following day and Sokolow was nominated by Rothschild to join the meeting which duly took place at Sykes's house. Sokolow was able to present the Zionists case and express his desire for a British protectorate although Picot declined to be drawn on this point. The day after that, Sokolow and Picot met alone at the French embassy, on this occasion Picot said "He personally would see that the facts about Zionism were communicated to the proper quarters and he would do his best to win for the movement whatever sympathies were necessary to be won so far as compatible with the French standpoint on this question.") At this point the Zionists were still unaware of the Sykes–Picot Agreement, although they had their suspicions. One of Sykes's goals was the mobilization of Zionism to the cause of British suzerainty in Palestine, so as to have arguments to put to France in support of that objective.

==== Late 1917: Progress of the wider war ====
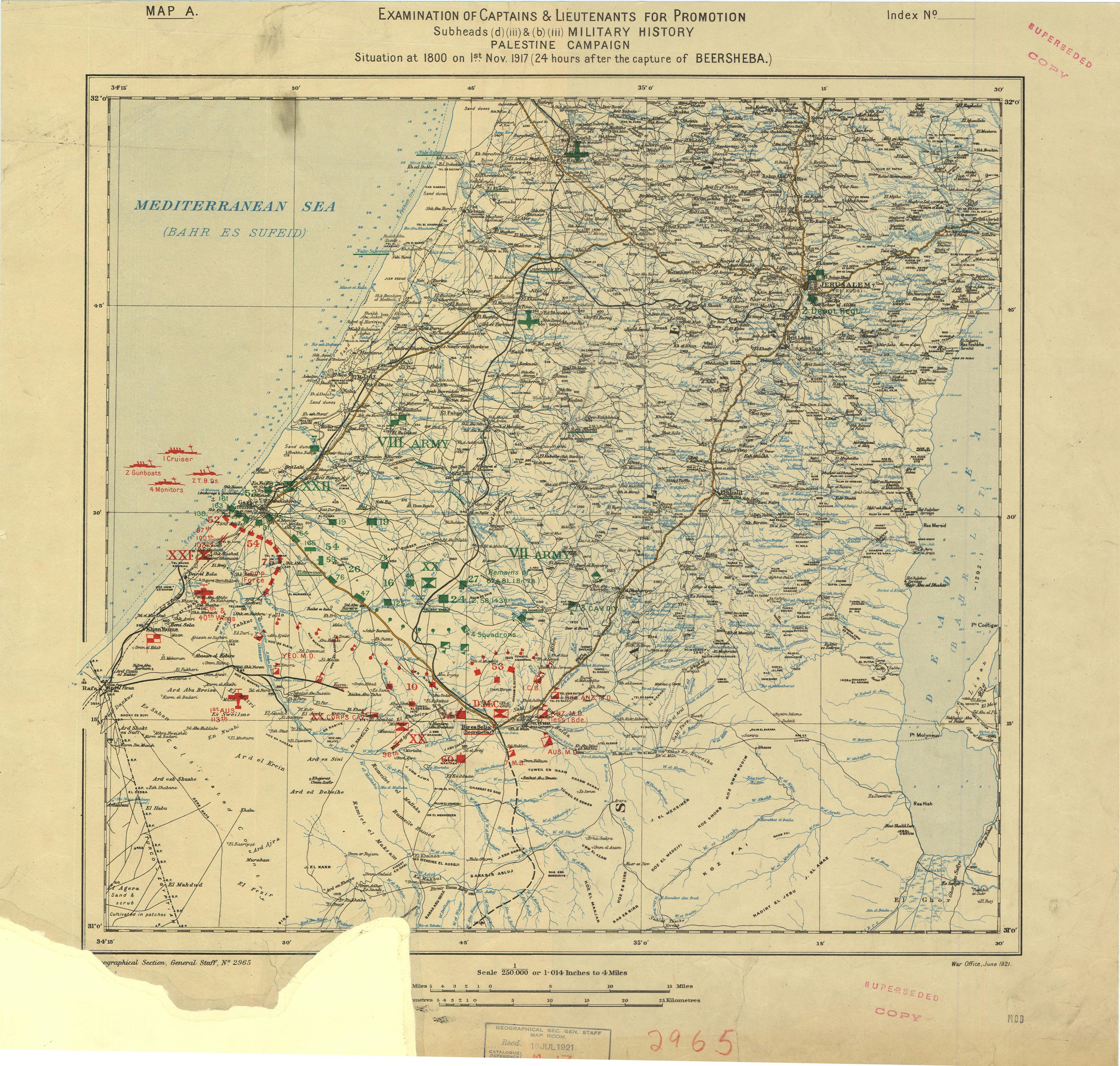
Military situation at 18:00 on 1 Nov 1917, immediately prior to the release of the Balfour Declaration.

During the period of the British War Cabinet discussions leading up to the declaration, the war had reached a period of stalemate. On the Western Front the tide would first turn in favour of the Central Powers in spring 1918, before decisively turning in favour of the Allies from July 1918 onwards. Although the United States declared war on Germany in the spring of 1917, it did not suffer its first casualties until 2 November 1917, at which point President Woodrow Wilson still hoped to avoid dispatching large contingents of troops into the war. The Russian forces were known to be distracted by the ongoing Russian Revolution and the growing support for the Bolshevik faction, but Alexander Kerensky's Provisional Government had remained in the war; Russia only withdrew after the final stage of the revolution on 7 November 1917.

== Approvals ==
=== April to June: Allied discussions ===
Balfour met Weizmann at the Foreign Office on 22 March 1917; two days later, Weizmann described the meeting as being "the first time I had a real business talk with him". Weizmann explained at the meeting that the Zionists had a preference for a British protectorate over Palestine, as opposed to an American, French or international arrangement; Balfour agreed, but warned that "there may be difficulties with France and Italy".

The French position in regard to Palestine and the wider Syria region during the lead up to the Balfour Declaration was largely dictated by the terms of the Sykes–Picot Agreement and was complicated from 23 November 1915 by increasing French awareness of the British discussions with the Sherif of Mecca. Prior to 1917, the British had led the fighting on the southern border of the Ottoman Empire alone, given their neighbouring Egyptian colony and the French preoccupation with the fighting on the Western Front that was taking place on their own soil. Italy's participation in the war, which began following the April 1915 Treaty of London, did not include involvement in the Middle Eastern sphere until the April 1917 Agreement of Saint-Jean-de-Maurienne; at this conference, Lloyd George had raised the question of a British protectorate of Palestine and the idea "had been very coldly received" by the French and the Italians. (Note: The War Cabinet, reviewing this conference on 25 April, "inclined to the view that sooner or later the Sykes–Picot Agreement might have to be reconsidered ... No action should be taken at present in this matter".) In May and June 1917, the French and Italians sent detachments to support the British as they built their reinforcements in preparation for a renewed attack on Palestine.

In early April, Sykes and Picot were appointed to act as the chief negotiators once more, this time on a month-long mission to the Middle East for further discussions with the Sherif of Mecca and other Arab leaders. (Note: Sykes as Chief Political Officer to the Egyptian Expeditionary Force and Picot as the Haut-Commissaire Français pour Les Territoires Occupés en Palestine et en Syrie (High Commissioner for the Territories [to be] Occupied in Palestine and Syria), received their instructions on 3 April and 2 April respectively. Sykes and Picot arrived in the Middle East at the end of April, and were to continue discussions until the end of May.) On 3 April 1917, Sykes met with Lloyd George, Lord Curzon and Maurice Hankey to receive his instructions in this regard, namely to keep the French onside while "not prejudicing the Zionist movement and the possibility of its development under British auspices, [and not] enter into any political pledges to the Arabs, and particularly none in regard to Palestine". Before travelling to the Middle East, Picot, via Sykes, invited Nahum Sokolow to Paris to educate the French government on Zionism. Sykes, who had prepared the way in correspondence with Picot, arrived a few days after Sokolow; in the meantime, Sokolow had met Picot and other French officials, and convinced the French Foreign Office to accept for study a statement of Zionist aims "in regard to facilities of colonization, communal autonomy, rights of language and establishment of a Jewish chartered company." Sykes went on ahead to Italy and had meetings with the British ambassador and British Vatican representative to prepare the way for Sokolow once again.

Sokolow was granted an audience with Pope Benedict XV on 6 May 1917. Sokolow's notes of the meeting – the only meeting records known to historians – stated that the Pope expressed general sympathy and support for the Zionist project. (Note: In his History of Zionism, Sokolow notes he had meetings with the Cardinals and an audience with the Pope, providing no other details. Sokolow wrote two reports of the talk with the Pope, one handwritten in French, which Minerbi relies on "because the conversation was probably held in that language and because this report was written in Sokolow's own hand right after the interview" and the other was "typewritten in Italian several days after the audience". Kreutz, following Stein, cautions that they are "not, of course, to be taken as a verbatim record" Minerbi's translation: "Sokolow: I am deeply moved by these historical memories, which are so apt. Allow me the liberty to add that the Rome that destroyed Judea was duly punished. It vanished, whereas not only do the Jewish people live on, they still have sufficient vitality to reclaim their land. His Holiness: Yes, yes, it is providential; God has willed it ... His Holiness: ... But the problem of the Holy Places is for us of utmost importance. The sacred rights must be preserved. We shall arrange this between the Church and the great Powers. You must honor these rights to their full extent ... These are rights hundreds of years old, guaranteed and preserved by all the governments.") On 21 May 1917 Angelo Sereni, president of the Committee of the Jewish Communities, (Note: The Committee of the Jewish Communities (in Italian: Comitato delle università israelitiche) is known today as the Union of Italian Jewish Communities (in Italian: Unione delle comunità ebraiche italiane, abbreviated UCEI)) presented Sokolow to Sidney Sonnino, the Italian Minister of Foreign Affairs. He was also received by Paolo Boselli, the Italian prime minister. Sonnino arranged for the secretary general of the ministry to send a letter to the effect that, although he could not express himself on the merits of a program which concerned all the allies, "generally speaking" he was not opposed to the legitimate claims of the Jews. On his return journey, Sokolow met with French leaders again and secured a letter dated 4 June 1917, giving assurances of sympathy towards the Zionist cause by Jules Cambon, head of the political section of the French foreign ministry. This letter was not published, but was deposited at the British Foreign Office. (Note: Though the latter was apparently submitted to Ronald Graham by Sokolow, Picot was asked to come over to London by end of October to appear at a Cabinet meeting and explain the French position in relation to the Zionist movement. Edy Kaufman cites Stein as considering it feasible the possibility that the document was not brought to the attention of Lord Balfour or that he forgot about its existence and cites Verete as believing the document probably lost.)

Following the United States' entry into the war on 6 April, the British Foreign Secretary led the Balfour Mission to Washington, D.C., and New York, where he spent a month between mid-April and mid-May. During the trip he spent significant time discussing Zionism with Louis Brandeis, a leading Zionist and a close ally of Wilson who had been appointed as a Supreme Court Justice a year previously. (Note: In 1929, Zionist leader Jacob de Haas wrote: "In May 1917 prior to the arrival of the Balfour Mission to the United States, President Wilson took occasion to afford ample opportunity for the discussion of Zionist Palestinian prospects, and the occasion was not neglected. At the first official reception given by President Wilson for Mr. Balfour, the latter singled out Brandeis as one with whom he desired private conversation. Mr. Balfour while in Washington summarized his own attitude in a single sentence, "I am a Zionist." But while Balfour and Brandeis met as often as circumstances demanded other Zionists met and discussed the Palestinian problem with all those members of the British mission whose understanding it was thought desirable to cultivate. This was made necessary because at that particular juncture the creation of an American mandatory for Palestine a policy Brandeis did not favour was being persistently discussed in the European press.")

=== June and July: Decision to prepare a declaration ===
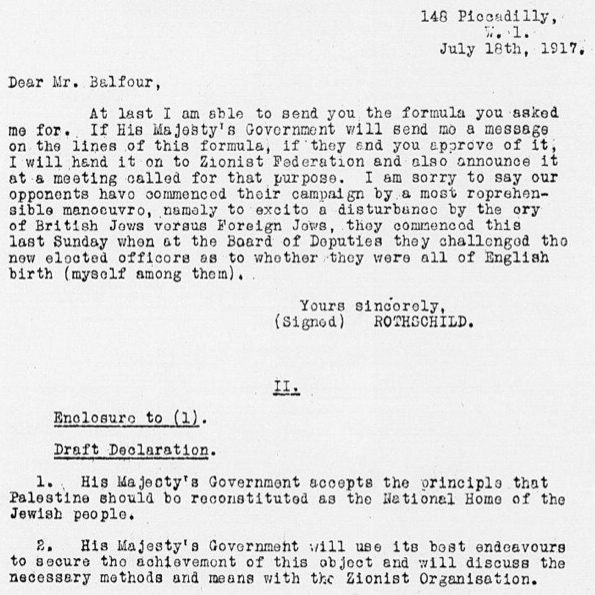
A copy of Lord Rothschild's initial draft declaration, together with its covering letter, 18 July 1917, from the British War Cabinet archives.

By 13 June 1917, it was acknowledged by Ronald Graham, head of the Foreign Office's Middle Eastern affairs department, that the three most relevant politicians – the Prime Minister, the Foreign Secretary, and the Parliamentary Under-Secretary of State for Foreign Affairs, Lord Robert Cecil – were all in favour of Britain supporting the Zionist movement; (Note: Ronald Graham wrote to Lord Hardinge, the Permanent Under-Secretary of State for Foreign Affairs (i.e. the most senior civil servant, or non-minister, at the Foreign Office) on 13 June 1917: "It would appear that in view of the sympathy towards the Zionist movement which has already been expressed by the Prime Minister, Mr. Balfour, Lord R. Cecil, and other statesmen, we are committed to support it, although until Zionist policy has been more clearly defined our support must be of a general character. We ought, therefore, to secure all the political advantage we can out of our connection with Zionism, and there is no doubt that this advantage will be considerable, especially in Russia, where the only means of reaching the Jewish proletariat is through Zionism, to which the vast majority of Jews in that country adhere.") on the same day Weizmann had written to Graham to advocate for a public declaration. (Note: Weizmann wrote that: "it appears desirable from every point of view that the British Government should give expression to its sympathy and support of the Zionist claims on Palestine. In fact, it need only confirm the view which eminent and representative members of the Government have many times expressed to us, and which have formed the basis of our negotiations throughout the long period of almost three years")

Six days later, at a meeting on 19 June, Balfour asked Lord Rothschild and Weizmann to submit a formula for a declaration. Over the next few weeks, a 143-word draft was prepared by the Zionist negotiating committee, but it was considered too specific on sensitive areas by Sykes, Graham and Rothschild. Separately, a very different draft had been prepared by the Foreign Office, described in 1961 by Harold Nicolson – who had been involved in preparing the draft – as proposing a "sanctuary for Jewish victims of persecution". The Foreign Office draft was strongly opposed by the Zionists, and was discarded; no copy of the draft has been found in the Foreign Office archives.

Following further discussion, a revised – and at just 46 words in length, much shorter – draft declaration was prepared and sent by Lord Rothschild to Balfour on 18 July. It was received by the Foreign Office, and the matter was brought to the Cabinet for formal consideration.

=== September and October: American consent and War Cabinet approval ===
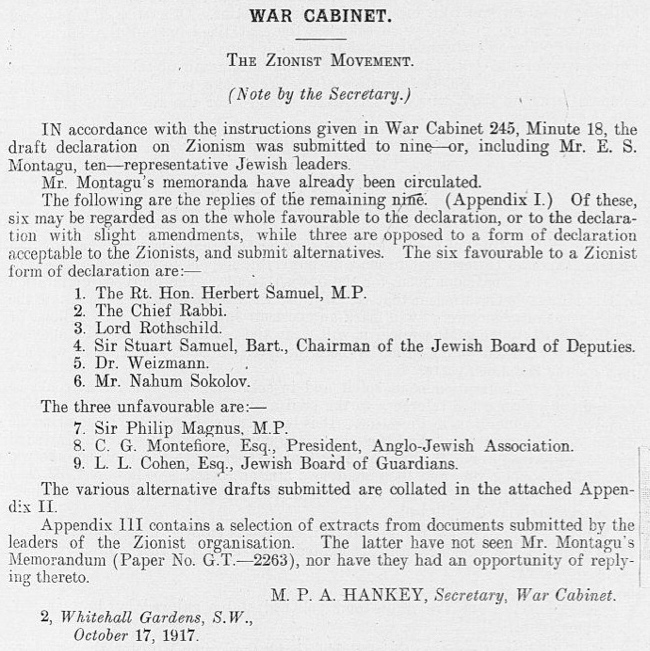
As part of the War Cabinet discussions, views were sought from ten "representative" Jewish leaders. Those in favour comprised four members of the Zionist negotiating team (Rothschild, Weizmann, Sokolow and Samuel), Stuart Samuel (Herbert Samuel's elder brother), and Chief Rabbi Joseph Hertz. Those against comprised Edwin Montagu, Philip Magnus, Claude Montefiore and Lionel Cohen.

The decision to release the declaration was taken by the British War Cabinet on 31 October 1917. This followed discussion at four War Cabinet meetings (including the 31 October meeting) over the space of the previous two months. In order to aid the discussions, the War Cabinet Secretariat, led by Maurice Hankey, the Cabinet Secretary and supported by his Assistant Secretaries – primarily Sykes and his fellow Conservative MP and pro-Zionist Leo Amery – solicited outside perspectives to put before the Cabinet. These included the views of government ministers, war allies – notably from President Woodrow Wilson – and in October, formal submissions from six Zionist leaders and four non-Zionist Jews.

British officials asked President Wilson for his consent on the matter on two occasions – first on 3 September, when he replied the time was not ripe, and later on 6 October, when he agreed with the release of the declaration.

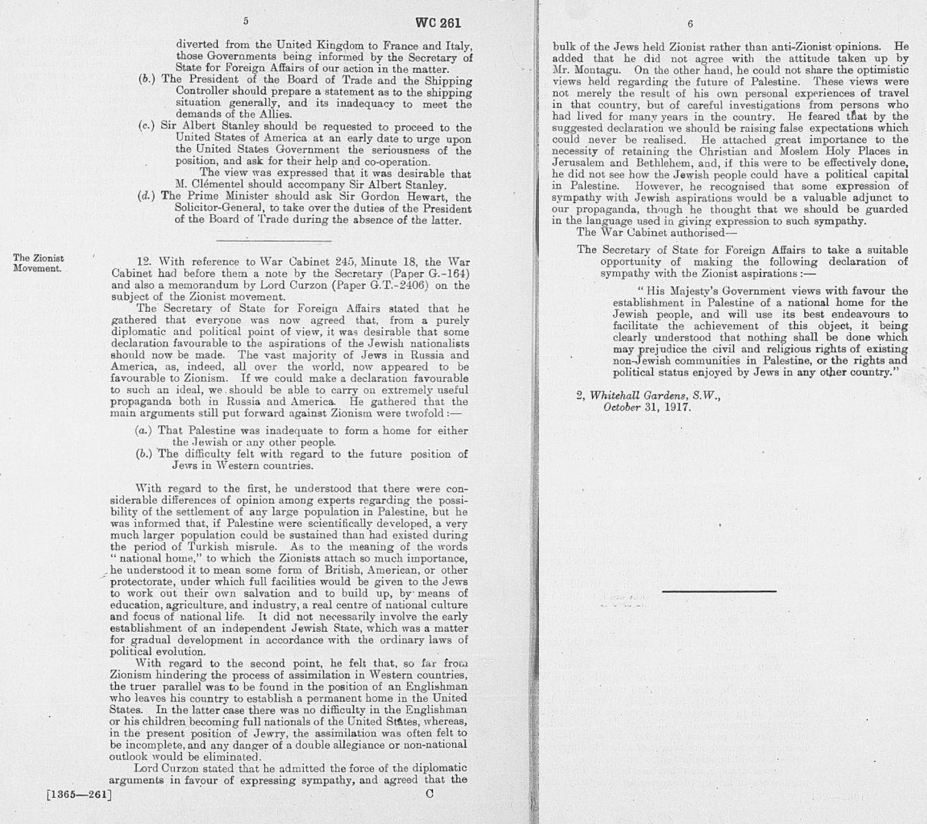
British War Cabinet minutes approving the release of the declaration, 31 October 1917

Excerpts from the minutes of these four War Cabinet meetings provide a description of the primary factors that the ministers considered:

- 3 September 1917: "With reference to a suggestion that the matter might be postponed, [Balfour] pointed out that this was a question on which the Foreign Office had been very strongly pressed for a long time past. There was a very strong and enthusiastic organisation, more particularly in the United States, who were zealous in this matter, and his belief was that it would be of most substantial assistance to the Allies to have the earnestness and enthusiasm of these people enlisted on our side. To do nothing was to risk a direct breach with them, and it was necessary to face this situation."
- 4 October 1917: "... [Balfour] stated that the German Government were making great efforts to capture the sympathy of the Zionist Movement. This Movement, though opposed by a number of wealthy Jews in this country, had behind it the support of a majority of Jews, at all events in Russia and America, and possibly in other countries ... Mr. Balfour then read a very sympathetic declaration by the French Government which had been conveyed to the Zionists, and he stated that he knew that President Wilson was extremely favourable to the Movement."
- 25 October 1917: "... the Secretary mentioned that he was being pressed by the Foreign Office to bring forward the question of Zionism, an early settlement of which was regarded as of great importance."
- 31 October 1917: "[Balfour] stated that he gathered that everyone was now agreed that, from a purely diplomatic and political point of view, it was desirable that some declaration favourable to the aspirations of the Jewish nationalists should now be made. The vast majority of Jews in Russia and America, as, indeed, all over the world, now appeared to be favourable to Zionism. If we could make a declaration favourable to such an ideal, we should be able to carry on extremely useful propaganda both in Russia and America."

== Drafting ==
Declassification of British government archives has allowed scholars to piece together the choreography of the drafting of the declaration; in his widely cited 1961 book, Leonard Stein published four previous drafts of the declaration.

The drafting began with Weizmann's guidance to the Zionist drafting team on its objectives in a letter dated 20 June 1917, one day following his meeting with Rothschild and Balfour. He proposed that the declaration from the British government should state: "its conviction, its desire or its intention to support Zionist aims for the creation of a Jewish national home in Palestine; no reference must be made I think to the question of the Suzerain Power because that would land the British into difficulties with the French; it must be a Zionist declaration."

A month after the receipt of the much-reduced 12 July draft from Rothschild, Balfour proposed a number of mainly technical amendments. The two subsequent drafts included much more substantial amendments: the first in a late August draft by Lord Milner – one of the original five members of Lloyd George's War Cabinet as a minister without portfolio (Note: Milner's appointment to the Cabinet was due to his role as High Commissioner for Southern Africa during the Second Boer War – Britain's last large-scale war prior to WWI) – which reduced the geographic scope from all of Palestine to "in Palestine", and the second from Milner and Amery in early October, which added the two "safeguard clauses".

List of known drafts of the Balfour Declaration, showing changes between each draft
Draft	Text	Changes
Preliminary Zionist draft July 1917	His Majesty's Government, after considering the aims of the Zionist Organization, accepts the principle of recognizing Palestine as the National Home of the Jewish people and the right of the Jewish people to build up its national life in Palestine under a protection to be established at the conclusion of peace following upon the successful issue of the War. His Majesty's Government regards as essential for the realization of this principle the grant of internal autonomy to the Jewish nationality in Palestine, freedom of immigration for Jews, and the establishment of a Jewish National Colonizing Corporation for the resettlement and economic development of the country. The conditions and forms of the internal autonomy and a Charter for the Jewish National Colonizing Corporation should, in the view of His Majesty's Government, be elaborated in detail and determined with the representatives of the Zionist Organization.	
Lord Rothschild draft 12 July 1917	1. His Majesty's Government accepts the principle that Palestine should be reconstituted as the national home of the Jewish people.; 2. His Majesty's Government will use its best endeavours to secure the achievement of this object and will discuss the necessary methods and means with the Zionist Organisation.	1. His Majesty's Government [*] accepts the principle ~~of recognizing~~ that Palestine should be reconstituted as the national home of the Jewish people. [*]; 2. His Majesty's Government [*] will use its best endeavours to secure the achievement of this object and will discuss the necessary methods and means with the Zionist Organisation.; * large amount of text deleted
Balfour draft Mid August 1917	His Majesty's Government accepts the principle that Palestine should be reconstituted as the national home of the Jewish people and will use their best endeavours to secure the achievement of this object and will be ready to consider any suggestions on the subject which the Zionist Organisation may desire to lay before them.	~~1.~~ His Majesty's Government accepts the principle that Palestine should be reconstituted as the national home of the Jewish people~~.~~ and ~~2.His Majesty's Government~~ will use ~~its~~ their best endeavours to secure the achievement of this object and will ~~discuss the necessary methods and means with~~ be ready to consider any suggestions on the subject which the Zionist Organisation may desire to lay before them.
Milner draft Late August 1917	His Majesty's Government accepts the principle that every opportunity should be afforded for the establishment of a home for the Jewish people in Palestine and will use its best endeavours to facilitate the achievement of this object and will be ready to consider any suggestions on the subject which the Zionist organisations may desire to lay before them.	His Majesty's Government accepts the principle that ~~Palestine should be reconstituted as the national home of~~ every opportunity should be afforded for the establishment of a home for the Jewish people in Palestine and will use ~~their~~ its best endeavours to ~~secure~~ facilitate the achievement of this object and will be ready to consider any suggestions on the subject which the Zionist ~~O~~organisations may desire to lay before them.
Milner–Amery draft 4 October 1917	His Majesty's Government views with favour the establishment in Palestine of a national home for the Jewish race, and will use its best endeavours to facilitate the achievement of this object, it being clearly understood that nothing shall be done which may prejudice the civil and religious rights of existing non-Jewish communities in Palestine or the rights and political status enjoyed in any other country by such Jews who are fully contented with their existing nationality.	His Majesty's Government ~~accepts the principle that every opportunity should be afforded for~~ views with favour the establishment in Palestine of a national home for the Jewish ~~people in Palestine~~ race, and will use its best endeavours to facilitate the achievement of this object ~~and will be ready to consider any suggestions on the subject which the Zionist organisations may desire to lay before them~~ , it being clearly understood that nothing shall be done which may prejudice the civil and religious rights of existing non-Jewish communities in Palestine or the rights and political status enjoyed in any other country by such Jews who are fully contented with their existing nationality.
Final version	His Majesty's Government view with favour the establishment in Palestine of a national home for the Jewish people, and will use their best endeavours to facilitate the achievement of this object, it being clearly understood that nothing shall be done which may prejudice the civil and religious rights of existing non-Jewish communities in Palestine, or the rights and political status enjoyed by Jews in any other country.	His Majesty's Government view~~s~~ with favour the establishment in Palestine of a national home for the Jewish ~~race~~ people, and will use ~~its~~ their best endeavours to facilitate the achievement of this object, it being clearly understood that nothing shall be done which may prejudice the civil and religious rights of existing non-Jewish communities in Palestine, or the rights and political status enjoyed by Jews in any other country ~~by such Jews who are fully contented with their existing nationality~~.

Subsequent authors have debated who the "primary author" really was. In his posthumously published 1981 book The Anglo-American Establishment, Georgetown University history professor Carroll Quigley explained his view that Lord Milner was the primary author of the declaration, (Note: Quigley wrote: "This declaration, which is always known as the Balfour Declaration, should rather be called "the Milner Declaration," since Milner was the actual draftsman and was, apparently, its chief supporter in the War Cabinet. This fact was not made public until 21 July 1937. At that time Ormsby-Gore, speaking for the government in Commons, said, "The draft as originally put up by Lord Balfour was not the final draft approved by the War Cabinet. The particular draft assented to by the War Cabinet and afterwards by the Allied Governments and by the United States ... and finally embodied in the Mandate, happens to have been drafted by Lord Milner. The actual final draft had to be issued in the name of the Foreign Secretary, but the actual draftsman was Lord Milner.") and more recently, William D. Rubinstein, Professor of Modern History at Aberystwyth University, Wales, proposed Amery instead. The historian Sahar Huneidi wrote that William Ormsby-Gore, in a report he prepared for John Evelyn Shuckburgh, head of the Middle East Department at the Colonial Office, claimed authorship, together with Amery, of the final draft form.

== Key issues ==
The agreed version of the declaration, a single sentence of just 67 words, was sent on 2 November 1917 in a short letter from Balfour to Walter Rothschild, for transmission to the Zionist Federation of Great Britain and Ireland. The declaration contained four clauses, of which the first two promised to support "the establishment in Palestine of a national home for the Jewish people", followed by two "safeguard clauses" with respect to "the civil and religious rights of existing non-Jewish communities in Palestine", and "the rights and political status enjoyed by Jews in any other country".

=== The "national home for the Jewish people" vs. Jewish state ===
"This is a very carefully worded document and but for the somewhat vague phrase 'A National Home for the Jewish People' might be considered sufficiently unalarming ... But the vagueness of the phrase cited has been a cause of trouble from the commencement. Various persons in high positions have used language of the loosest kind calculated to convey a very different impression to the more moderate interpretation which can be put upon the words. President Wilson brushed away all doubts as to what was intended from his point of view when, in March 1919, he said to the Jewish leaders in America, 'I am moreover persuaded that the allied nations, with the fullest concurrence of our own Government and people are agreed that in Palestine shall be laid the foundations of a Jewish Commonwealth.' (Note: On April 16, 1919, in response to a request from the American Peace Commissioners that he clarify the newspaper report of his views, Wilson stated "Of course I did not use any of the words quoted in the enclosed, and they do not indeed purport to be my words. But I did in substance say what is quoted though the expression "foundation of a Jewish commonwealth" goes a little further than my idea at that time. All that I meant was to corroborate our expressed acquiescence in the position of the British government in regard to the future of Palestine") The late President Roosevelt declared that one of the Allies peace conditions should be that 'Palestine must be made a Jewish State.' Mr. Winston Churchill has spoken of a 'Jewish State' and Mr. Bonar Law has talked in Parliament of 'restoring Palestine to the Jews'." (Note: Schmidt cites Stein "Bonar law's views on the Zionist question are unknown" together with his son and his biographer for similar opinions.)

— Report of the Palin Commission, August 1920

The term "national home" was intentionally ambiguous, having no legal value or precedent in international law, such that its meaning was unclear when compared to other terms such as "state". The term was intentionally used instead of "state" because of opposition to the Zionist program within the British Cabinet. According to historian Norman Rose, the chief architects of the declaration contemplated that a Jewish State would emerge in time while the Palestine Royal Commission concluded that the wording was "the outcome of a compromise between those Ministers who contemplated the ultimate establishment of a Jewish State and those who did not." (Note: Norman Rose described this as follows: "There can be no doubt about what was in the minds of the chief architects of the Balfour Declaration. The evidence is incontrovertible. All envisaged, in the fullness of time, the emergence of a Jewish state. For the Zionists, accordingly, it was the first step that would lead to Jewish statehood. Yet for Weizmann – a confirmed Anglophile – and the Zionist leadership there proved to be adverse repercussions. As the British attempted to reconcile their diverse obligations, there began for the Zionists a period full of promise but also of intense frustration. One cynic noted that the process of whittling down the Balfour Declaration began on 3 November 1917.")

Interpretation of the wording has been sought in the correspondence leading to the final version of the declaration. An official report to the War Cabinet sent by Sykes on 22 September said that the Zionists did not want "to set up a Jewish Republic or any other form of state in Palestine or in any part of Palestine" but rather preferred some form of protectorate as provided in the Palestine Mandate. (Note: Sykes's official memorandum providing feedback on the meeting recorded the following: "What the Zionists do not want: I. To have any special political hold on the old city of Jerusalem itself or control over any Christian or Moslem Holy Places; II. To set up a Jewish Republic or any other form of state in Palestine or in any part of Palestine; III. To enjoy any special rights not enjoyed by other inhabitants of Palestine; On the other hand the Zionists do want: I. Recognition of the Jewish inhabitants of Palestine as a national unit, federated with [other] national units in Palestine; II. The recognition of [the] right of bona fide Jewish settlers to be included in the Jewish national unit in Palestine") A month later, Curzon produced a memorandum circulated on 26 October 1917 where he addressed two questions, the first concerning the meaning of the phrase "a National Home for the Jewish race in Palestine"; he noted that there were different opinions ranging from a fully fledged state to a merely spiritual centre for the Jews.

Sections of the British press assumed that a Jewish state was intended even before the Declaration was finalized. (Note: The Daily Chronicle, on 30 March 1917, advocated reviving "the Jewish Palestine" and building "a Zionist state ... under British protection." The New Europe, on 12, 19, and 26 April 1917, wrote about "a Jewish State," as did other papers, including the Liverpool Courier (24 April), The Spectator (5 May), and the Glasgow Herald (29 May). Some British papers wrote that it was in Britain's interest to reestablish a "Jewish State" or "Jewish Country." Among them were the Methodist Times, The Manchester Guardian, The Globe, and The Daily News.) In the United States the press began using the terms "Jewish National Home", "Jewish State", "Jewish republic" and "Jewish Commonwealth" interchangeably.

Treaty expert David Hunter Miller, who was at the conference and subsequently compiled a 22 volume compendium of documents, provides a report of the Intelligence Section of the American Delegation to the Paris Peace Conference of 1919 which recommended that "there be established a separate state in Palestine," and that "it will be the policy of the League of Nations to recognize Palestine as a Jewish state, as soon as it is a Jewish state in fact." The report further advised that an independent Palestinian state under a British League of Nations mandate be created. Jewish settlement would be allowed and encouraged in this state and this state's holy sites would be under the control of the League of Nations. Indeed, the Inquiry spoke positively about the possibility of a Jewish state eventually being created in Palestine if the necessary demographics for this were to exist.

Historian Matthew Jacobs later wrote that the US approach was hampered by the "general absence of specialist knowledge about the region" and that "like much of the Inquiry's work on the Middle East, the reports on Palestine were deeply flawed" and "presupposed a particular outcome of the conflict". He quotes Miller, writing about one report on the history and impact of Zionism, "absolutely inadequate from any standpoint and must be regarded as nothing more than material for a future report".

Lord Robert Cecil on 2 December 1917, assured an audience that the government fully intended that "Judea [was] for the Jews." Yair Auron opines that Cecil, then a deputy Foreign Secretary representing the British Government at a celebratory gathering of the English Zionist Federation, "possibly went beyond his official brief" in saying (he cites Stein) "Our wish is that Arabian countries shall be for the Arabs, Armenia for the Armenians and Judaea for the Jews".

The following October Neville Chamberlain, while chairing a Zionist meeting, discussed a "new Jewish State." At the time, Chamberlain was a parliamentary candidate who became Member of Parliament for Ladywood, Birmingham; recalling the event in 1939, just after Chamberlain had approved the 1939 White Paper, the Jewish Telegraph Agency noted that the Prime Minister had "experienced a pronounced change of mind in the 21 years intervening" A year later, on the Declaration's second anniversary, General Jan Smuts said that Britain "would redeem her pledge ... and a great Jewish state would ultimately rise." In similar vein, Winston Churchill a few months later stated:

If, as may well happen, there should be created in our own lifetime by the banks of the Jordan a Jewish State under the protection of the British Crown which might comprise three or four millions of Jews, an event will have occurred in the history of the world which would from every point of view be beneficial.

At the 22 June 1921 meeting of the Imperial Cabinet, Churchill was asked by Arthur Meighen, the Canadian Prime Minister, about the meaning of the national home. Churchill said "If in the course of many years they become a majority in the country, they naturally would take it over ... pro rata with the Arab. We made an equal pledge that we would not turn the Arab off his land or invade his political and social rights".

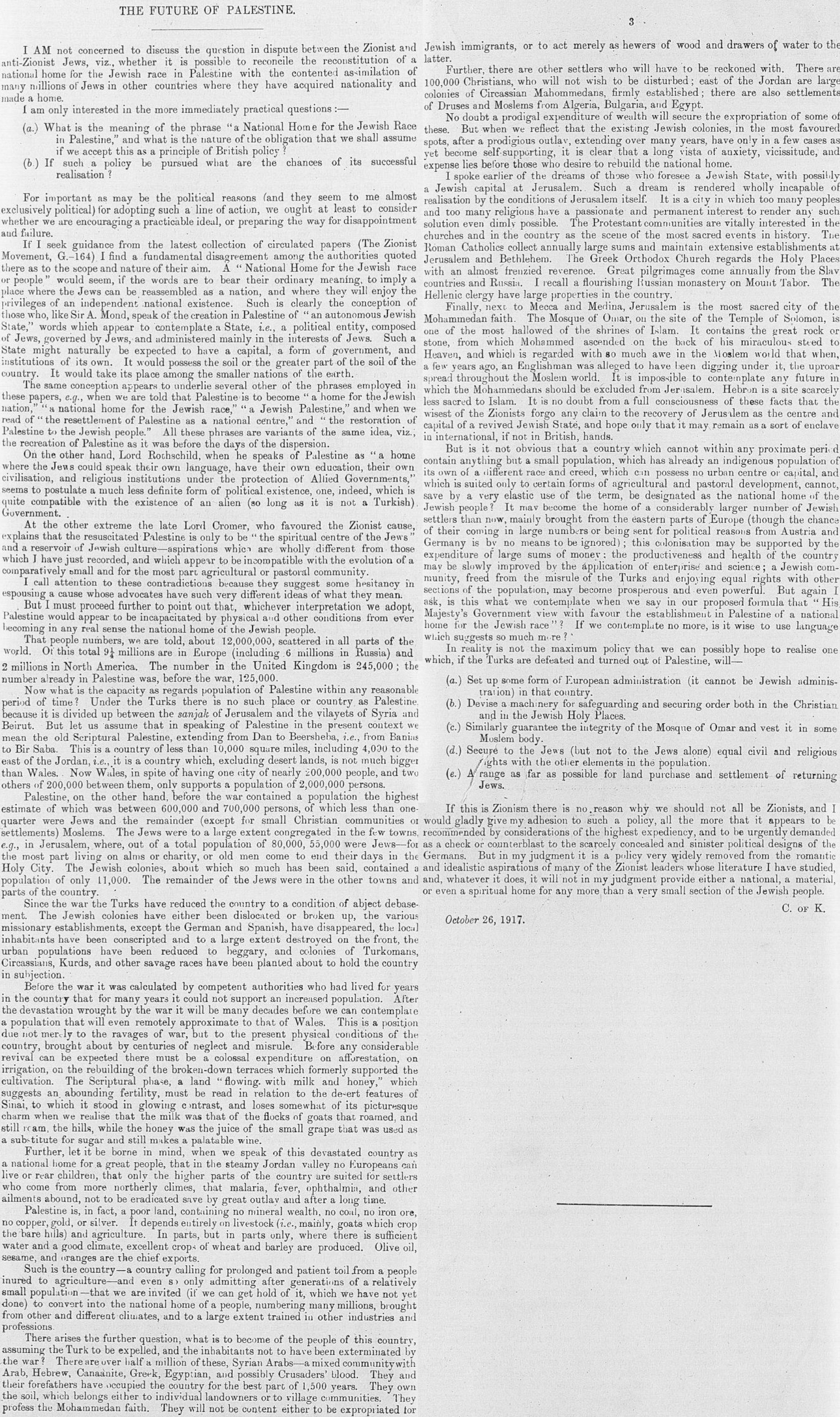
Lord Curzon's 26 October 1917 cabinet memorandum, circulated one week prior to the declaration, addressed the meaning of the phrase "a National Home for the Jewish race in Palestine", noting the range of different opinions

Responding to Curzon in January 1919, Balfour wrote "Weizmann has never put forward a claim for the Jewish Government of Palestine. Such a claim in my opinion is clearly inadmissible and personally I do not think we should go further than the original declaration which I made to Lord Rothschild".

In February 1919, France issued a statement that it would not oppose putting Palestine under British trusteeship and the formation of a Jewish State. Friedman further notes that France's attitude went on to change; Yehuda Blum, while discussing France's "unfriendly attitude towards the Jewish national movement", notes the content of a report made by Robert Vansittart (a leading member of the British delegation to the Paris Peace Conference) to Curzon in November 1920 which said:

[The French] had agreed to a Jewish National Home, not a Jewish State. They considered we were steering straight upon the latter, and the very last thing they would do was to enlarge that State for they totally disapproved our policy.

Greece's Foreign Minister told the editor of the Salonica Jewish organ Pro-Israel that "the establishment of a Jewish State meets in Greece with full and sincere sympathy ... A Jewish Palestine would become an ally of Greece." In Switzerland, a number of noted historians including professors Tobler, Forel-Yvorne, and Rogaz, supported the idea of establishing a Jewish state, with one referring to it as "a sacred right of the Jews." While in Germany, officials and most of the press took the Declaration to mean a British sponsored state for the Jews.

The British government, including Churchill, made it clear that the Declaration did not intend for the whole of Palestine to be converted into a Jewish National Home, "but that such a Home should be founded in Palestine." (Note: When asked in 1922 what was meant by the development of the Jewish National Home in Palestine, Churchill replied, "it may be answered that it is not the imposition of a Jewish nationality upon the inhabitants of Palestine as a whole, but the further development of the existing Jewish community ... in order that it may become a centre in which the Jewish people as a whole may take, on grounds of religion and race, an interest and a pride ... that it should know that it is in Palestine as of right and not on sufferance ... that the existence of a Jewish National Home in Palestine should be internationally guaranteed." (Note: Churchill's letter to T. E. Lawrence added, "It is manifestly right that the Jews who are scattered all over the world should have a national centre and a national home where some of them may be reunited. And where else could that be but in the land of Palestine, with which for more than three thousand years they have been intimately and profoundly associated?")) (Note: Col. T. E. Lawrence in a letter to Churchill on 17 January 1921, wrote that Emir Faisal, the eldest son of King Hussein, "had agreed to abandon all claims of his father to Palestine" in return for Arab sovereignty in Iraq, Trans-Jordan and Syria. Friedman refers to this letter as being from Lawrence to Marsh (Churchill's private secretary) states that the date of 17 January is erroneous ("a slip of the pen, or a misprint") and claims that the most likely date is 17 February. Friedman as well refers to an undated ("presumably 17 February") letter from Lawrence to Churchill that does not contain this statement. Paris references only the Marsh letter and while claiming the evidence is unclear, suggests that the letter may have described a meeting that took place shortly after 8 January at Edward Turnour, Earl Winterton's country house. Faisal's biographer discusses an acrimonious meeting which took place on 20 January 1921 between Faisal, Haddad, Haidar and Lindsey, Young and Kinahan Cornwallis and says that this meeting led to a misunderstanding that would later be used against Faisal as Churchill later claimed in parliament that Faisal had acknowledged that the territory of Palestine was specifically excluded from the promises of support for an independent Arab Kingdom. Allawi says that the minutes of the meeting show only that Faisal accepted that this could be the British government interpretation of the exchanges without necessarily agreeing with them. In parliament, Churchill in 1922 confirmed this, "..a conversation held in the Foreign Office on the 20th January, 1921, more than five years after the conclusion of the correspondence on which the claim was based. On that occasion the point of view of His Majesty's Government was explained to the Emir, who expressed himself as prepared to accept the statement that it had been the intention of His Majesty's Government to exclude Palestine.") Emir Faisal, King of Syria and Iraq, made a formal written agreement with Zionist leader Chaim Weizmann, which was drafted by T. E. Lawrence, whereby they would try to establish a peaceful relationship between Arabs and Jews in Palestine. The 3 January 1919 Faisal–Weizmann Agreement was a short-lived agreement for Arab–Jewish cooperation on the development of a Jewish homeland in Palestine. (Note: Ali Allawi explained this as follows: "When Faisal left the meeting with Weizmann to explain his actions to his advisers who were in a nearby suite of offices at the Carlton Hotel, he was met with expressions of shock and disbelief. How could he sign a document that was written by a foreigner in favour of another foreigner in English in a language of which he knew nothing? Faisal replied to his advisers as recorded in 'Awni 'Abd al-Hadi's memoirs, "You are right to be surprised that I signed such an agreement written in English. But I warrant you that your surprise will disappear when I tell you that I did not sign the agreement before I stipulated in writing that my agreement to sign it was conditional on the acceptance by the British government of a previous note that I had presented to the Foreign Office… [This note] contained the demand for the independence of the Arab lands in Asia, starting from a line that begins in the north at Alexandretta-Diyarbakir and reaching the Indian Ocean in the south. And Palestine, as you know, is within these boundaries… I confirmed in this agreement before signing that I am not responsible for the implementation of anything in the agreement if any modification to my note is allowed"") Faisal did treat Palestine differently in his presentation to the Peace Conference on 6 February 1919 saying "Palestine, for its universal character, [should be] left on one side for the mutual consideration of all parties concerned". The agreement was never implemented. (Note: Although it was noted by UNSCOP that "To many observers at the time, conclusion of the Feisal-Weizmann Agreement promised well for the future co-operation of Arab and Jew in Palestine." and further referring to the 1937 report of the Palestine Royal Commission which noted that "Not once since 1919 had any Arab leader said that co-operation with the Jews was even possible" despite expressed hopes to the contrary by British and Zionist representatives.) In a subsequent letter written in English by Lawrence for Faisal's signature, he explained:

We feel that the Arabs and Jews are cousins in race, suffering similar oppression at the hands of powers stronger than themselves, and by a happy coincidence have been able to take the first step toward the attainment of their national ideals together. We Arabs, especially the educated among us, look with deepest sympathy on the Zionist movement ... We will do our best, in so far as we are concerned, to help them through; we will wish the Jews a most hearty welcome home.

When the letter was tabled at the Shaw Commission in 1929, Rustam Haidar spoke to Faisal in Baghdad and cabled that Faisal had "no recollection that he wrote anything of the sort". In January 1930, Haidar wrote to a newspaper in Baghdad that Faisal: "finds it exceedingly strange that such a matter is attributed to him as he at no time would consider allowing any foreign nation to share in an Arab country". Awni Abd al-Hadi, Faisal's secretary, wrote in his memoirs that he was not aware that a meeting between Frankfurter and Faisal took place and that: "I believe that this letter, assuming that it is authentic, was written by Lawrence, and that Lawrence signed it in English on behalf of Faisal. I believe this letter is part of the false claims made by Chaim Weizmann and Lawrence to lead astray public opinion." According to Allawi, the most likely explanation for the Frankfurter letter is that a meeting took place, a letter was drafted in English by Lawrence, but that its "contents were not entirely made clear to Faisal. He then may or may not have been induced to sign it", since it ran counter to Faisal's other public and private statements at the time. A 1 March interview by Le Matin quoted Faisal as saying:

This feeling of respect for other religions dictates my opinion about Palestine, our neighbor. That the unhappy Jews come to reside there and behave as good citizens of this country, our humanity rejoices given that they are placed under a Muslim or Christian government mandated by The League of Nations. If they want to constitute a state and claim sovereign rights in this region, I foresee very serious dangers. It is to be feared that there will be a conflict between them and the other races. (Note: Ce sentiment de respect pour les autres religions dicte mon opinion touchant la Palestine, notre voisine. Que les juifs malheureux viennent s'y refugieret se comportent en bons citoyens de ce pays, notre humanite s'en rejouit mais quells soient places sous un gouverment musulman ou chretien mandate par La Societe des nations. S'ils veulent constituer un Etat et revendiquer des droits souveraigns dans cette region je prevois de tres graves dangers. Il est a craindre qu'il y ait conflit entre eux et les autres races.)

Referring to his 1922 White Paper, Churchill later wrote that "there is nothing in it to prohibit the ultimate establishment of a Jewish State." And in private, many British officials agreed with the Zionists' interpretation that a state would be established when a Jewish majority was achieved.

When Chaim Weizmann met with Churchill, Lloyd George and Balfour at Balfour's home in London on 21 July 1921, Lloyd George and Balfour assured Weizmann "that by the Declaration they had always meant an eventual Jewish State," according to Weizmann minutes of that meeting. Lloyd George stated in 1937 that it was intended that Palestine would become a Jewish Commonwealth if and when Jews "had become a definite majority of the inhabitants", (Note: Lloyd George stated in his testimony to the Palestine Royal Commission: "The idea was, and this was the interpretation put upon it at the time, that a Jewish State was not to be set up immediately by the Peace Treaty without reference to the wishes of the majority of the inhabitants. On the other hand, it was contemplated that when the time arrived for according representative institutions to Palestine, if the Jews had meanwhile responded to the opportunity afforded them by the idea of a national home and had become a definite majority of the inhabitants, then Palestine would thus become a Jewish Commonwealth.") and Leo Amery echoed the same position in 1946. (Note: Amery's testimony under oath to the Anglo-American Committee of Inquiry in January 1946: "The phrase "the establishment in Palestine of a National Home for the Jewish people" was intended and understood by all concerned to mean at the time of the Balfour Declaration that Palestine would ultimately become a "Jewish Commonwealth" or a "Jewish State", if only Jews came and settled there in sufficient numbers.") In the UNSCOP report of 1947, the issue of home versus state was subjected to scrutiny arriving at a similar conclusion to that of Lloyd George. (Note: What exactly was in the minds of those who made the Balfour Declaration is speculative. The fact remains that, in the light of experience acquired as a consequence of serious disturbances in Palestine, the mandatory Power, in a statement on "British Policy in Palestine," issued on 3 June 1922 by the Colonial Office, placed a restrictive construction upon the Balfour Declaration. and Nevertheless, neither the Balfour Declaration nor the Mandate precluded the eventual creation of a Jewish State. The Mandate in its Preamble recognized, with regard to the Jewish people, the "grounds for reconstituting their National Home". By providing, as one of the main obligations of the mandatory Power the facilitation of Jewish immigration, it conferred upon the Jews an opportunity, through large-scale immigration, to create eventually a Jewish State with a Jewish majority.)

=== Scope of the national home "in Palestine" ===
The statement that such a homeland would be found "in Palestine" rather than "of Palestine" was also deliberate. (Note: Gelvin wrote: "The words of the Balfour Declaration were carefully chosen. It was no accident that the declaration contains the phrase "in Palestine" rather than "of Palestine", nor was it an accident that the foreign office would use the words "national home" rather than the more precise "state" – in spite of the fact that "national home" has no precedent or standing in international law. And what exactly do "view with favour" and "use their best endeavours" mean? The seeming ambiguities of the declaration reflect debates not only within the British government but within the British Zionist and Jewish communities as well.") The proposed draft of the declaration contained in Rothschild's 12 July letter to Balfour referred to the principle "that Palestine should be reconstituted as the National Home of the Jewish people." In the final text, following Lord Milner's amendment, the word "reconstituted" was removed and the word "that" was replaced with "in".

This text thereby avoided committing the entirety of Palestine as the National Home of the Jewish people, resulting in controversy in future years over the intended scope, especially the Revisionist Zionism sector, which claimed entirety of Mandatory Palestine and Emirate of Transjordan as Jewish Homeland This was clarified by the 1922 Churchill White Paper, which wrote that "the terms of the declaration referred to do not contemplate that Palestine as a whole should be converted into a Jewish National Home, but that such a Home should be founded 'in Palestine.'"

The declaration did not include any geographical boundaries for Palestine. Following the end of the war, three documents – the declaration, the McMahon–Hussein correspondence and the Sykes–Picot Agreement – became the basis for the negotiations to set the boundaries of Palestine.

=== Civil and religious rights of non-Jewish communities in Palestine ===
"If, however, the strict terms of the Balfour Statement are adhered to ... it can hardly be doubted that the extreme Zionist Program must be greatly modified. For "a national home for the Jewish people" is not equivalent to making Palestine into a Jewish State; nor can the erection of such a Jewish State be accomplished without the gravest trespass upon the "civil and religious rights of existing non-Jewish communities in Palestine." The fact came out repeatedly in the Commission's conference with Jewish representatives, that the Zionists looked forward to a practically complete dispossession of the present non-Jewish inhabitants of Palestine, by various forms of purchase."

— Report of the King–Crane Commission, August 1919

The declaration's first safeguard clause referred to protecting the civil and religious rights of non-Jews in Palestine. The clause had been drafted together with the second safeguard by Leo Amery in consultation with Lord Milner, with the intention to "go a reasonable distance to meeting the objectors, both Jewish and pro-Arab, without impairing the substance of the proposed declaration". (Note: Amery described this moment in his memoirs: "Half an hour before the meeting Milner looked in from his room in the Cabinet offices, next door to mine, told me of the difficulties, and showed me one or two alternative drafts which had been suggested, with none of which he was quite satisfied. Could I draft something which would go a reasonable distance to meeting the objectors, both Jewish and pro-Arab, without impairing the substance of the proposed declaration?")

Arabs constituted around 90% of the population of Palestine, but – as stated by Ronald Storrs, Britain's Military Governor of Jerusalem between 1917 and 1920 – they were "not so much [named but] lumped together under the negative and humiliating definition of 'Non-Jewish Communities'". (Note: Ronald Storrs, Britain's Military Governor of Jerusalem between 1917 and 1920, wrote in 1943: "The Declaration which, in addition to its main Jewish message, was at pains to reassure non-Palestinian Jews on the score of their national status, took no account whatever of the feelings or desires of the actual inhabitants of Palestine. In its drafting, Arabs observed the main and position portion to be reserved for the Jewish people, while the other races and creeds were not so much as named, either as Arabs, Moslems or Christians, but were lumped together under the negative and humiliating definition of "Non-Jewish Communities" and relegated to subordinate provisos. They further remarked a sinister and significant omission. While their religions and civil rights were specifically to be safeguarded, of their political rights there was no mention whatever. Clearly, they had none.") Additionally, there was no reference to protecting the political rights of this group, as there was regarding Jews in other countries. This lack of interest was frequently contrasted against the commitment to the Jewish community, with various terms used over subsequent years to regard the two obligations as linked. (Note: The term "twofold duty" was used by the Permanent Mandates Commission in 1924, the phrase "double undertaking" was used by Prime Minister Ramsay MacDonald in his April 1930 House of Commons speech, the Passfield white paper, and his 1931 letter to Chaim Weizmann, whilst the 1937 Palestine Royal Commission used the term "dual obligation".) A heated question was whether the status of both groups had "equal weight", which the British government and the Permanent Mandates Commission held to be the case in the 1930 Passfield white paper. (Note: At the 9 June 1930 Permanent Mandates Commission, the British Accredited Representative, Drummond Shiels, set out the British policy to reconcile the two communities. The Permanent Mandates Commission summarized that "From all these statements two assertions emerge, which should be emphasised: (1) that the obligations laid down by the Mandate in regard to the two sections of the population are of equal weight; (2) that the two obligations imposed on the Mandatory are in no sense irreconcilable. The Mandates Commission has no objection to raise to these two assertions, which, in its view, accurately express what it conceives to be the essence of the Mandate for Palestine and ensure its future." This was quoted in the Passfield white paper, with the note that: "His Majesty's Government are fully in accord with the sense of this pronouncement and it is a source of satisfaction to them that it has been rendered authoritative by the approval of the Council of the League of Nations.")

Balfour stated in February 1919 that Palestine was considered an exceptional case in which, referring to the local population, "we deliberately and rightly decline to accept the principle of self-determination," (Note: 19 February 1919, Balfour wrote to Lloyd George that: "The weak point of our position of course is that in the case of Palestine we deliberately and rightly decline to accept the principle of self-determination. If the present inhabitants were consulted they would unquestionably give an anti-Jewish verdict. Our justification for our policy is that we regard Palestine as being absolutely exceptional; that we consider the question of the Jews outside Palestine as one of world importance, and that we conceive the Jews to have an historic claim to a home in their ancient land; provided that home can be given them without either dispossessing or oppressing the present inhabitants.") although he considered that the policy provided self-determination to Jews. Avi Shlaim considers this the declaration's "greatest contradiction". This principle of self-determination had been declared on numerous occasions subsequent to the declaration – President Wilson's January 1918 Fourteen Points, Sykes's Declaration to the Seven in June 1918, the November 1918 Anglo-French Declaration, and the June 1919 Covenant of the League of Nations that had established the mandate system. (Note: Wilson's January 1918 Fourteen Points stated a requirement for "free, open-minded, and absolutely impartial adjustment of all colonial claims, based upon a strict observance of the principle that in determining all such questions of sovereignty the interests of the population concerned must have equal weight with the equitable claims of the government whose title is to be determined", Sykes's June 1918 Declaration to the Seven stated that "the future government of these regions should be based upon the principle of the consent of the governed", the November 1918 Anglo-French Declaration stated that the local "national governments and administrations [will derive] their authority from the free exercise of the initiative and choice of the indigenous populations," and the June 1919 Covenant of the League of Nations stated that "the wishes of these communities must be a principal consideration in the selection of a Mandatory" and described a "sacred trust", which was later interpreted in 1971 by the International Court of Justice that "the ultimate objective of the sacred trust was the self-determination and independence of the peoples concerned".) In an August 1919 memo Balfour acknowledged the inconsistency among these statements, and further explained that the British had no intention of consulting the existing population of Palestine. (Note: In an August 1919 memo discussing the Covenant of the League of Nations, Balfour explained: "What I have never been able to understand is how [our policy] can be harmonised with the [Anglo-French] declaration, the Covenant, or the instructions to the Commission of Enquiry ... In short, so far as Palestine is concerned, the Powers have made no statement of fact which is not admittedly wrong, and no declaration of policy which, at least in the letter, they have not always intended to violate," and further that: "The contradiction between the letter of the Covenant and the policy of the Allies is even more flagrant in the case of the 'independent nation' of Palestine than in that of the 'independent nation' of Syria. For in Palestine we do not propose even to go through the form of consulting the wishes of the present inhabitants of the country, though the American Commission has been going through the form of asking what they are. The four Great Powers are committed to Zionism. And Zionism, be it right or wrong, good or bad, is rooted in age-long traditions, in present needs, in future hopes, of far profounder import than the desires and prejudices of the 700,000 Arabs who now inhabit that ancient land.") The results of the ongoing American King–Crane Commission of Enquiry consultation of the local population – from which the British had withdrawn – were suppressed for three years until the report was leaked in 1922. Subsequent British governments have acknowledged this deficiency, in particular the 1939 committee led by the Lord Chancellor, Frederic Maugham, which concluded that the government had not been "free to dispose of Palestine without regard for the wishes and interests of the inhabitants of Palestine", and the April 2017 statement by British Foreign Office minister of state Baroness Anelay that the government acknowledged that "the Declaration should have called for the protection of political rights of the non-Jewish communities in Palestine, particularly their right to self-determination." (Note: This statement was first made during a debate regarding the upcoming centenary of the Declaration; the Foreign Office subsequently repeated the statement in response to a petition on the UK Parliament petitions website, which had called for an official apology for the Declaration.) (Note: The United Nations Special Committee on Palestine acknowledged the same in 1947, noting that: "With regard to the principle of self-determination ... it may well be said that the Jewish National Home and the 'sui generis' Mandate for Palestine run counter to that principle.")

=== Rights and political status of Jews in other countries ===
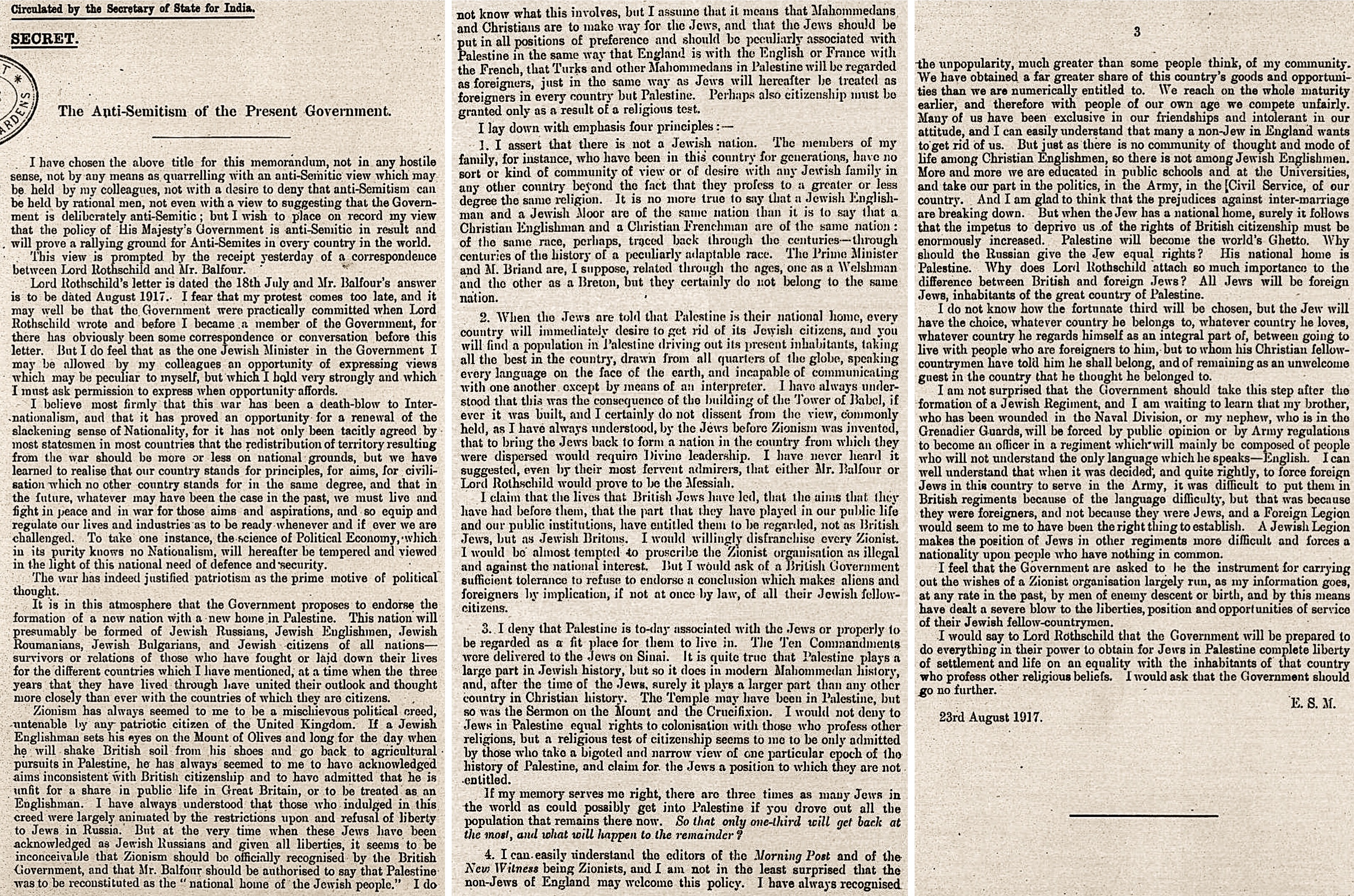
Edwin Montagu, then the only Jew in a senior British government position, wrote a 23 August 1917 memorandum condemning Zionism as a "mischievous political creed" and stating his belief that: "the policy of His Majesty's Government is anti-Semitic in result and will prove a rallying ground for anti-Semites in every country of the world."

The second safeguard clause was a commitment that nothing should be done which might prejudice the rights of the Jewish communities in other countries outside of Palestine. The original drafts of Rothschild, Balfour, and Milner did not include this safeguard, which was drafted together with the preceding safeguard in early October, in order to reflect opposition from influential members of the Anglo-Jewish community. Lord Rothschild took exception to the proviso on the basis that it presupposed the possibility of a danger to non-Zionists, which he denied.

The Conjoint Foreign Committee of the Board of Deputies of British Jews and the Anglo-Jewish Association had published a letter in The Times on 24 May 1917 entitled Views of Anglo-Jewry, signed by the two organisations' presidents, David Lindo Alexander and Claude Montefiore, stating their view that: "the establishment of a Jewish nationality in Palestine, founded on this theory of homelessness, must have the effect throughout the world of stamping the Jews as strangers in their native lands, and of undermining their hard-won position as citizens and nationals of these lands." This was followed in late August by Edwin Montagu, an influential anti-Zionist Jew and Secretary of State for India, and the only Jewish member of the British Cabinet, who wrote in a Cabinet memorandum that: "The policy of His Majesty's Government is anti-Semitic in result and will prove a rallying ground for anti-Semites in every country of the world."

== Reaction ==
The text of the declaration was published in the press one week after it was signed, on 9 November 1917. Other related events took place within a short timeframe, the two most relevant being the almost immediate British military capture of Palestine and the leaking of the previously secret Sykes–Picot Agreement. On the military side, both Gaza and Jaffa fell within several days, and Jerusalem was surrendered to the British on 9 December. The publication of the Sykes–Picot Agreement, following the Russian Revolution, in the Bolshevik Izvestia and Pravda on 23 November 1917 and in the British Manchester Guardian on 26 November 1917, represented a dramatic moment for the Allies' Eastern campaign: "the British were embarrassed, the Arabs dismayed and the Turks delighted." The Zionists had been aware of the outlines of the agreement since April and specifically the part relevant to Palestine, following a meeting between Weizmann and Cecil where Weizmann made very clear his objections to the proposed scheme.

=== Zionist reaction ===
First issue of the official Zionist magazine The Maccabaean following the Balfour Declaration

The declaration represented the first public support for Zionism by a major political power – its publication galvanized Zionism, which finally had obtained an official charter. In addition to its publication in major newspapers, leaflets were circulated throughout Jewish communities. These leaflets were airdropped over Jewish communities in Germany and Austria, as well as the Pale of Settlement, which had been given to the Central Powers following the Russian withdrawal.

Weizmann had argued that the declaration would have three effects: it would swing Russia to maintain pressure on Germany's Eastern Front, since Jews had been prominent in the March Revolution of 1917; it would rally the large Jewish community in the United States to press for greater funding for the American war effort, underway since April of that year; and, lastly, that it would undermine German Jewish support for Kaiser Wilhelm II.

The declaration spurred an unintended and extraordinary increase in the number of adherents of American Zionism; in 1914 the 200 American Zionist societies comprised a total of 7,500 members, which grew to 30,000 members in 600 societies in 1918 and 149,000 members in 1919. (Note: Reinharz wrote: "British and French estimates of the balance of power in the American Jewish public were greatly affected by this success in the struggle for a congress. It was a victory for Zionists under the leadership of close advisers to the Wilson Administration, such as Brandeis and Frankfurter, against the desires of the bankers from Wall Street, the AJC, and the National Workers' Committee. It spurred an impressive growth in organized membership: from 7,500 in 200 Zionist societies in 1914 to 30,000 in 600 societies in 1918. One year later, the number of members reached 149,000. In addition, the FAZ and the PZC collected millions of dollars during the war years. This demonstration of support for Zionism among the masses of American Jews played a vital role in the British considerations which led to the Balfour Declaration. The American Government (or, at least, the State Department), which did not particularly want to support the Declaration, did so almost in spite of itself – apparently because of the growing strength of Zionists in the United States.") Whilst the British had considered that the declaration reflected a previously established dominance of the Zionist position in Jewish thought, it was the declaration itself that was subsequently responsible for Zionism's legitimacy and leadership. (Note: James Renton wrote: "Overall, it is clear that the Declaration, the Anglo-Zionist propaganda campaign, the public support from international labour and President Wilson gave the Zionists a powerful position from which to further their influence in American Jewry. This could not have been further from the effect intended by the British Government. The Balfour Declaration was certainly not meant as a tool to aid the growth of the Zionist movement, or to exacerbate communal divisions. Its issuance was supposed to reflect a shift that had already taken place within world Jewry, but in fact was responsible for the Zionists claim to legitimacy and leadership.")

Exactly one month after the declaration was issued, a large-scale celebration took place at the Royal Opera House – speeches were given by leading Zionists as well as members of the British administration including Sykes and Cecil. From 1918 until the Second World War, Jews in Mandatory Palestine celebrated Balfour Day as an annual national holiday on 2 November. The celebrations included ceremonies in schools and other public institutions and festive articles in the Hebrew press. In August 1919 Balfour approved Weizmann's request to name the first post-war settlement in Mandatory Palestine, "Balfouria", in his honour. It was intended to be a model settlement for future American Jewish activity in Palestine.

Herbert Samuel, the Zionist MP whose 1915 memorandum had framed the start of discussions in the British Cabinet, was asked by Lloyd George on 24 April 1920 to act as the first civil governor of British Palestine, replacing the previous military administration that had ruled the area since the war. This decision reflected a clear pro-Zionist stance by the British government. Shortly after beginning the role in July 1920, he was invited to read the haftarah from Isaiah 40 at the Hurva Synagogue in Jerusalem, which, according to his memoirs, led the congregation of older settlers to feel that the "fulfilment of ancient prophecy might at last be at hand". (Note: On walking to the Hurva Synagogue on Shabbat Nachamu, Samuel wrote in his memoirs that he "found the surrounding streets densely thronged, and the great building itself packed to the doors and to the roof, mostly by older settlers, some of those who had come to live, and to die, in the Holy City for piety's sake. Now, on that day, for the first time since the destruction of the Temple, they could see one of their own people as governor in the Land of Israel. To them, it seemed that the fulfilment of ancient prophecy might at last be at hand. When, in accordance with the usual ritual, I was 'called to the Reading of the Law' and from the central platform recited in Hebrew the prayer and the blessing, 'Have mercy upon Zion, for it is the home of our life, and save her that is grieved in spirit, speedily, even in our days. Blessed art Thou, O Lord, who makest Zion joyful through her children': and when there followed the opening words of a chapter of Isaiah appointed for that day, 'Comfort ye, comfort ye my people, saith your God. Speak ye comfortably to Jerusalem, and cry unto her, that her warfare is accomplished, that her iniquity is pardoned,' – the emotion that I could not but feel seemed to spread throughout the vast congregation. Many wept. One could almost hear the sigh of generations.")

=== Opposition in Palestine ===
The most popular Palestinian Arab newspaper, Filastin, published a four-page editorial addressed to Lord Balfour in March 1925. The editorial begins with "J'Accuse!", in a reference to the outrage at French anti-semitism 27 years previously.

The local Christian and Muslim community of Palestine, who constituted almost 90% of the population, strongly opposed the declaration. As described by the Palestinian-American philosopher Edward Said in 1979, it was perceived as being made: "(a) by a European power, (b) about a non-European territory, (c) in a flat disregard of both the presence and the wishes of the native majority resident in that territory, and (d) it took the form of a promise about this same territory to another foreign group." (Note: Edward Said wrote in his 1979 The Question of Palestine: "What is important about the declaration is, first, that it has long formed the juridical basis of Zionist claims to Palestine and, second, and more crucial for our purposes here, that it was a statement whose positional force can only be appreciated when the demographic or human realities of Palestine are kept clearly in mind. That is, the declaration was made (a) by a European power, (b) about a non-European territory, (c) in a flat disregard of both the presence and the wishes of the native majority resident in that territory, and (d) it took the form of a promise about this same territory to another foreign group, so that this foreign group might, quite literally, make this territory a national home for the Jewish people. There is not much use today in lamenting such a statement as the Balfour Declaration. It seems more valuable to see it as part of a history, of a style and set of characteristics centrally constituting the question of Palestine as it can be discussed even today.")

According to the 1919 King–Crane Commission, "No British officer, consulted by the Commissioners, believed that the Zionist programme could be carried out except by force of arms." A delegation of the Muslim-Christian Association, headed by Musa al-Husayni, expressed public disapproval on 3 November 1918, one day after the Zionist Commission parade marking the first anniversary of the Balfour Declaration. They handed a petition signed by more than 100 notables to Ronald Storrs, the British military governor:

We have noticed yesterday a large crowd of Jews carrying banners and over-running the streets shouting words which hurt the feeling and wound the soul. They pretend with open voice that Palestine, which is the Holy Land of our fathers and the graveyard of our ancestors, which has been inhabited by the Arabs for long ages, who loved it and died in defending it, is now a national home for them ... We Arabs, Muslim and Christian, have always sympathized profoundly with the persecuted Jews and their misfortunes in other countries ... but there is wide difference between such sympathy and the acceptance of such a nation ... ruling over us and disposing of our affairs.

The group also protested the carrying of new "white and blue banners with two inverted triangles in the middle", drawing the attention of the British authorities to the serious consequences of any political implications in raising the banners. Later that month, on the first anniversary of the occupation of Jaffa by the British, the Muslim-Christian Association sent a lengthy memorandum and petition to the military governor protesting once more any formation of a Jewish state. The majority of Britain's military leaders considered Balfour's declaration either a mistake, or one that presented grave risks.

=== Broader Arab response ===
In the broader Arab world, the declaration was seen as a betrayal of the British wartime understandings with the Arabs. The Sharif of Mecca and other Arab leaders considered the declaration a violation of a previous commitment made in the McMahon–Hussein correspondence in exchange for launching the Arab Revolt.

Following the publication of the declaration in an Egyptian newspaper, Al Muqattam, the British dispatched Commander David George Hogarth to see Hussein in January 1918 bearing the message that the "political and economic freedom" of the Palestinian population was not in question. Hogarth reported that Hussein "would not accept an independent Jewish State in Palestine, nor was I instructed to warn him that such a state was contemplated by Great Britain". Hussein had also learned of the Sykes–Picot Agreement when it was leaked by the new Soviet government in December 1917, but was satisfied by two disingenuous messages from Sir Reginald Wingate, who had replaced McMahon as High Commissioner of Egypt, assuring him that the British commitments to the Arabs were still valid and that the Sykes–Picot Agreement was not a formal treaty.

Continuing Arab disquiet over Allied intentions also led during 1918 to the British Declaration to the Seven and the Anglo-French Declaration, the latter promising "the complete and final liberation of the peoples who have for so long been oppressed by the Turks, and the setting up of national governments and administrations deriving their authority from the free exercise of the initiative and choice of the indigenous populations".

In 1919, King Hussein refused to ratify the Treaty of Versailles. After February 1920, the British ceased to pay subsidy to him. In August 1920, five days after the signing of the Treaty of Sèvres, which formally recognized the Kingdom of Hejaz, Curzon asked Cairo to procure Hussein's signature to both treaties and agreed to make a payment of £30,000 conditional on signature. Hussein declined and in 1921, stated that he could not be expected to "affix his name to a document assigning Palestine to the Zionists and Syria to foreigners." Following the 1921 Cairo Conference, Lawrence was sent to try and obtain the King's signature to a treaty as well as to Versailles and Sèvres, a £60,000 annual subsidy being proposed; this attempt also failed. During 1923, the British made one further attempt to settle outstanding issues with Hussein and once again, the attempt foundered, Hussein continued in his refusal to recognize the Balfour Declaration or any of the Mandates that he perceived as being his domain. In March 1924, having briefly considered the possibility of removing the offending article from the treaty, the government suspended any further negotiations; within six months they withdrew their support in favour of their central Arabian ally Ibn Saud, who proceeded to conquer Hussein's kingdom.

=== Allies and Associated Powers ===
The declaration was first endorsed by a foreign government on 27 December 1917, when Serbian Zionist leader and diplomat David Albala announced the support of Serbia's government in exile during a mission to the United States. The French and Italian governments offered their endorsements in 1918. At a private meeting in London on 1 December 1918, Lloyd George and French Prime Minister Georges Clemenceau agreed to certain modifications to the Sykes–Picot Agreement, including British control of Palestine.

On 25 April 1920, the San Remo conference – an outgrowth of the Paris Peace Conference attended by the prime ministers of Britain, France and Italy, the Japanese Ambassador to France, and the United States Ambassador to Italy – established the basic terms for three League of Nations mandates: a French mandate for Syria, and British mandates for Mesopotamia and Palestine. With respect to Palestine, the resolution stated that the British were responsible for putting into effect the terms of the Balfour Declaration. The French and the Italians made clear their dislike of the "Zionist cast of the Palestinian mandate" and objected especially to language that did not safeguard the "political" rights of non-Jews, accepting Curzon's claim that "in the British language all ordinary rights were included in "civil rights"". At the request of France, it was agreed that an undertaking was to be inserted in the mandate's procès-verbal that this would not involve the surrender of the rights hitherto enjoyed by the non-Jewish communities in Palestine. The Italian endorsement of the Declaration had included the condition "... on the understanding that there is no prejudice against the legal and political status of the already existing religious communities ..." The boundaries of Palestine were left unspecified, to "be determined by the Principal Allied Powers." Three months later, in July 1920, the French defeat of Faisal's Arab Kingdom of Syria precipitated the British need to know "what is the 'Syria' for which the French received a mandate at San Remo?" and "does it include Transjordania?" – it subsequently decided to pursue a policy of associating Transjordan with the mandated area of Palestine without adding it to the area of the Jewish National Home.

In 1922, Congress officially endorsed America's support for the Balfour Declaration through the passage of the Lodge–Fish Resolution, notwithstanding opposition from the State Department. Professor Lawrence Davidson, of West Chester University, whose research focuses on American relations with the Middle East, argues that President Wilson and Congress ignored democratic values in favour of "biblical romanticism" when they endorsed the declaration. He points to an organized pro-Zionist lobby in the United States, which was active at a time when the country's small Arab American community had little political power.

=== Central Powers ===
Despite Balfour's warning to the War Cabinet that Germany was aiming to court Zionist support, German authorities were balancing the interests of their Zionist and non-Zionist Jewish communities (the latter represented by the Hilfsverein der Juden in Deutschland) and refrained from showing favoritism to one side or the other. They successfully urged the Ottomans to show lenience towards Zionists but were not attempting anything like an equivalent to the Balfour Declaration.

The publication of the Balfour Declaration was thus met with tactical responses from the Central Powers. The participation of the Ottoman Empire in the alliance meant that Germany was unable to effectively counter the British pronouncement. Some within the German government viewed potential Zionist support for Britain's war effort as a substantial loss for their side. (Note: Weizmann explained as follows: "The German government, on the other hand, was deeply distressed that the British government should get the better of it. It called our representatives in Germany together and tried to explain to them that the German government would have eventually done the same thing, but that it could not because of its alliance with Turkey, which compelled it to move slowly in the matter.")

Two weeks following the declaration, Ottokar Czernin, the Austrian Foreign Minister, gave an interview to Arthur Hantke, President of the Zionist Federation of Germany, promising that his government would influence the Turks once the war was over. On 12 December, the Ottoman Grand Vizier, Talaat Pasha, gave an interview to the German newspaper Vossische Zeitung that was published on 31 December and subsequently released in the German-Jewish periodical Jüdische Rundschau on 4 January 1918, in which he referred to the declaration as "une blague" (a deception) and promised that under Ottoman rule "all justifiable wishes of the Jews in Palestine would be able to find their fulfilment" subject to the absorptive capacity of the country. This Turkish statement was endorsed by the German Foreign Office on 5 January 1918. On 8 January 1918, a German-Jewish Society, the Union of German Jewish Organizations for the Protection of the Rights of the Jews of the East, (Note: In the original German: Vereinigung jüdischer Organisationen Deutschlands zur Wahrung der Rechte der Juden des Ostens (VJOD)) was formed to advocate for further progress for Jews in Palestine.

Following the war, the Treaty of Sèvres was signed by the Ottoman Empire on 10 August 1920. The treaty dissolved the Ottoman Empire, requiring Turkey to renounce sovereignty over much of the Middle East. Article 95 of the treaty incorporated the terms of the Balfour Declaration with respect to "the administration of Palestine, within such boundaries as may be determined by the Principal Allied Powers". Since incorporation of the declaration into the Treaty of Sèvres did not affect the legal status of either the declaration or the Mandate, there was also no effect when Sèvres was superseded by the Treaty of Lausanne, which did not include any reference to the declaration.

In 1922, German anti-Semitic theorist Alfred Rosenberg in his primary contribution to Nazi theory on Zionism, Der Staatsfeindliche Zionismus ("Zionism, the Enemy of the State"), accused German Zionists of working for a German defeat and supporting Britain and the implementation of the Balfour Declaration, in a version of the stab-in-the-back myth. (Note: This is described similarly by William Helmreich and Francis Nicosia. Helmreich noted that: "It represented in part an elaboration on ideas already expressed in articles in the Volkischer Beobachter and in other published works, notably Die Spur. The title provides the gist of a thesis that Rosenberg sought to convey to his readers: "The Zionist organization in Germany is nothing more than an organization that pursues a legalized undermining of the German state." He accused German Zionists of having betrayed Germany during the war by supporting Britain's Balfour Declaration and pro-Zionist policies and charged that they had actively worked for a German defeat and the Versailles settlement to obtain a Jewish National Home in Palestine. He went on to assert that the interests of Zionism were first and foremost those of world Jewry, and by implication the international Jewish conspiracy." In addition, Nicosia notes: "Rosenberg argues that the Jews had planned the Great War in order to secure a state in Palestine. In other words, he suggested that they generated violence and war among the gentiles in order to secure their own, exclusively Jewish, interests.") Adolf Hitler took a similar approach in some of his speeches from 1920 onwards.

=== The Holy See ===
With the advent of the declaration and the British entry into Jerusalem on 9 December, the Vatican reversed its earlier sympathetic attitude to Zionism and adopted an oppositional stance that was to continue until the early 1990s.

=== Evolution of British opinion ===
"It is said that the effect of the Balfour Declaration was to leave the Moslems and Christians dumbfounded ... It is impossible to minimise the bitterness of the awakening. They considered that they were to be handed over to an oppression which they hated far more than the Turk's and were aghast at the thought of this domination ... Prominent people openly talk of betrayal and that England has sold the country and received the price ... Towards the Administration [the Zionists] adopted the attitude of "We want the Jewish State and we won't wait", and they did not hesitate to avail themselves of every means open to them in this country and abroad to force the hand of an Administration bound to respect the "Status Quo" and to commit it, and thereby future Administrations, to a policy not contemplated in the Balfour Declaration ... What more natural than that [the Moslems and Christians] should fail to realise the immense difficulties the Administration was and is labouring under and come to the conclusion that the openly published demands of the Jews were to be granted and the guarantees in the Declaration were to become but a dead letter?"

— Report of the Palin Commission, August 1920

The British policy as stated in the declaration was to face numerous challenges to its implementation in the following years. The first of these was the indirect peace negotiations which took place between Britain and the Ottomans in December 1917 and January 1918 during a pause in the hostilities for the rainy season; although these peace talks were unsuccessful, archival records suggest that key members of the War Cabinet may have been willing to permit leaving Palestine under nominal Turkish sovereignty as part of an overall deal.

In October 1919, almost a year after the end of the war, Lord Curzon succeeded Balfour as Foreign Secretary. Curzon had been a member of the 1917 Cabinet that had approved the declaration, and according to British historian Sir David Gilmour, Curzon had been "the only senior figure in the British government at the time who foresaw that its policy would lead to decades of Arab–Jewish hostility". He therefore determined to pursue a policy in line with its "narrower and more prudent rather than the wider interpretation". Following Bonar Law's appointment as Prime Minister in late 1922, Curzon wrote to Law that he regarded the declaration as "the worst" of Britain's Middle East commitments and "a striking contradiction of our publicly declared principles".

In August 1920 the report of the Palin Commission, the first in a long line of British Commissions of Inquiry on the question of Palestine during the Mandate period, noted that "The Balfour Declaration ... is undoubtedly the starting point of the whole trouble". The conclusion of the report, which was not published, mentioned the Balfour Declaration three times, stating that "the causes of the alienation and exasperation of the feelings of the population of Palestine" included:

- "inability to reconcile the Allies' declared policy of self-determination with the Balfour Declaration, giving rise to a sense of betrayal and intense anxiety for their future";
- "misapprehension of the true meaning of the Balfour Declaration and forgetfulness of the guarantees determined therein, due to the loose rhetoric of politicians and the exaggerated statements and writings of interested persons, chiefly Zionists"; and
- "Zionist indiscretion and aggression since the Balfour Declaration aggravating such fears".

British public and government opinion became increasingly unfavourable to state support for Zionism; even Sykes had begun to change his views in late 1918. (Note: Diplomat and Sykes's biographer, Shane Leslie, wrote in 1923 of Sykes: "His last journey to Palestine had raised many doubts, which were not set at rest by a visit to Rome. To Cardinal Gasquet he admitted the change of his views on Zionism, and that he was determined to qualify, guide and, if possible, save the dangerous situation which was rapidly arising. If death had not been upon him it would not have been too late.") In February 1922 Churchill telegraphed Samuel, who had begun his role as High Commissioner for Palestine 18 months earlier, asking for cuts in expenditure and noting:

In both Houses of Parliament there is growing movement of hostility, against Zionist policy in Palestine, which will be stimulated by recent Northcliffe articles. (Note: Viscount Northcliffe, who owned The Times, the Daily Mail, and other publishing totalling around two fifths of the total British newspaper circulation, published a statement from Cairo on 15 February 1922 (p. 10) suggesting Palestine risked becoming a second Ireland. Further articles were published in The Times on 11 April (p. 5), 26 April (p. 15), 23 June (p. 17), 3 July (p. 15) and 25 July (p. 15)) I do not attach undue importance to this movement, but it is increasingly difficult to meet the argument that it is unfair to ask the British taxpayer, already overwhelmed with taxation, to bear the cost of imposing on Palestine an unpopular policy.

Following the issuance of the Churchill White Paper in June 1922, the House of Lords rejected a Palestine Mandate that incorporated the Balfour Declaration by 60 votes to 25, following a motion issued by Lord Islington. The vote proved to be only symbolic as it was subsequently overruled by a vote in the House of Commons following a tactical pivot and variety of promises made by Churchill. (Note: Churchill concluded the Commons debate with the following argument: "Palestine is all the more important to us ... in view of the ever-growing significance of the Suez Canal; and I do not think £1,000,000 a year ... would be too much for Great Britain to pay for the control and guardianship of this great historic land, and for keeping the word that she has given before all the nations of the world." Mathew described Churchill's manoeuvre as follows: "... the judgment was overturned by a large majority in the Commons, a result not of a sudden opinion shift but of Churchill's skillful opportunism in turning at the last minute a general debate on funding for the colonies worldwide into a vote of confidence on the government's Palestine policy, emphasizing in his concluding remarks not a Zionist argument but imperial and strategic considerations.)

In February 1923, following the change in government, Victor Cavendish, 9th Duke of Devonshire, the new Secretary of State for the Colonies, in a lengthy memorandum for the Cabinet, laid the foundation for a secret review of Palestine policy:

It would be idle to pretend that the Zionist policy is other than an unpopular one. It has been bitterly attacked in Parliament and is still being fiercely assailed in certain sections of the press. The ostensible grounds of attack are threefold:(1) the alleged violation of the McMahon pledges; (2) the injustice of imposing upon a country a policy to which the great majority of its inhabitants are opposed; and (3) the financial burden upon the British taxpayer ...

His covering note asked for a statement of policy to be made as soon as possible and that the cabinet ought to focus on three questions: (1) whether or not pledges to the Arabs conflict with the Balfour declaration; (2) if not, whether the new government should continue the policy set down by the old government in the 1922 White Paper; and (3) if not, what alternative policy should be adopted.

Stanley Baldwin, replacing Bonar Law as prime minister, in June 1923 set up a cabinet sub-committee whose terms of reference were:

examine Palestine policy afresh and to advise the full Cabinet whether Britain should remain in Palestine and whether if she remained, the pro-Zionist policy should be continued.

The Cabinet approved the report of this committee on 31 July 1923. Describing it as "nothing short of remarkable", Quigley noted that the government was admitting to itself that its support for Zionism had been prompted by considerations having nothing to do with the merits of Zionism or its consequences for Palestine. As Huneidi noted, "wise or unwise, it is well nigh impossible for any government to extricate itself without a substantial sacrifice of consistency and self-respect, if not honour."

The wording of the declaration was thus incorporated into the British Mandate for Palestine, a legal instrument that created Mandatory Palestine with an explicit purpose of putting the declaration into effect and was finally formalized in September 1923. Unlike the declaration itself, the Mandate was legally binding on the British government. In June 1924, Britain made its report to the Permanent Mandates Commission for the period July 1920 to the end of 1923 containing nothing of the candor reflected in the internal documents; the documents relating to the 1923 reappraisal stayed secret until the early 1970s.

== Historiography and motivations ==
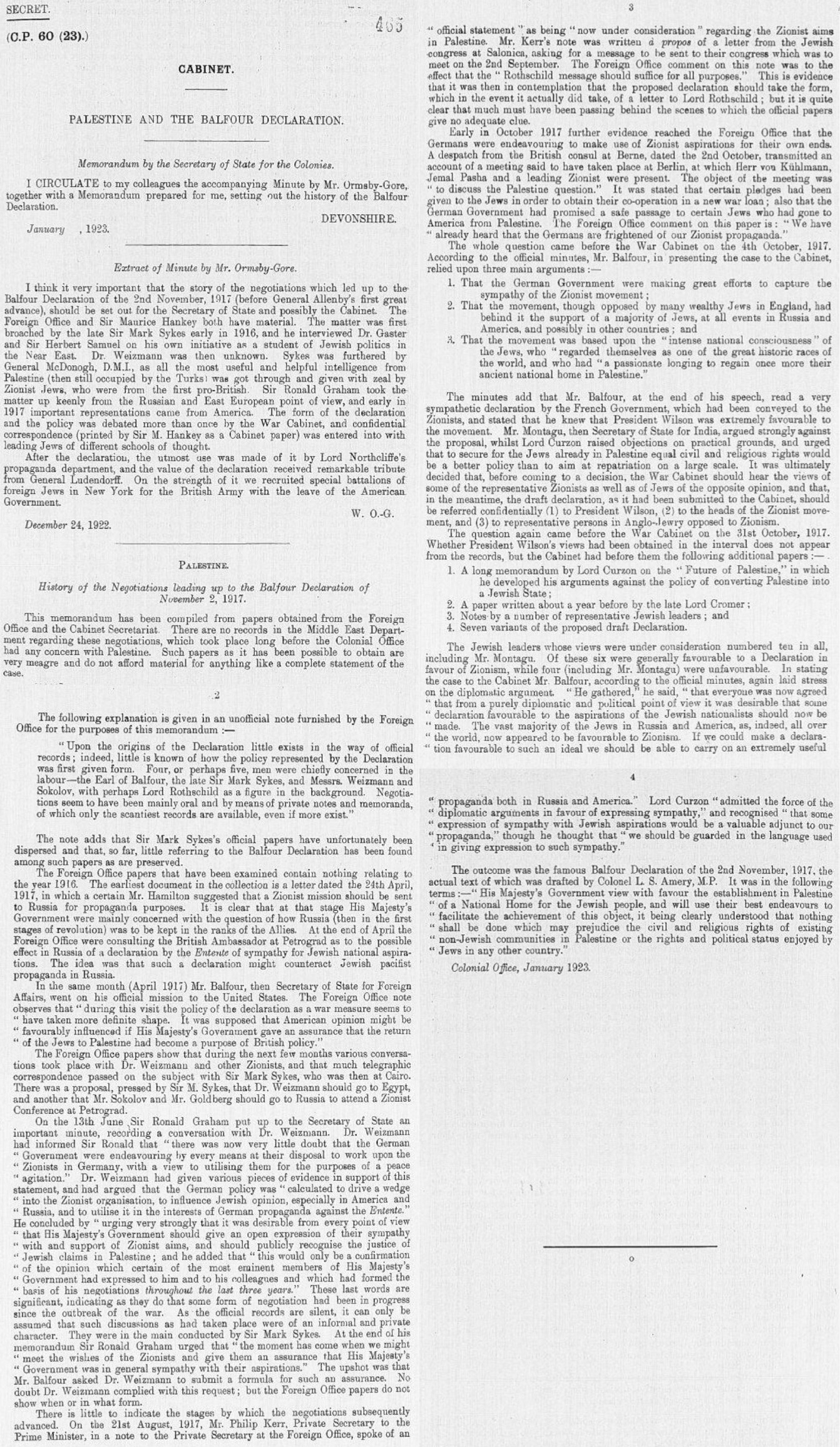
"Palestine and the Balfour Declaration", Cabinet Paper reviewing the background to the declaration, January 1923

Lloyd George and Balfour remained in government until the collapse of the coalition in October 1922. Under the new Conservative government, attempts were made to identify the background to and motivations for the declaration. A private Cabinet memorandum was produced in January 1923, providing a summary of the then-known Foreign Office and War Cabinet records leading up to the declaration. An accompanying Foreign Office note asserted that the primary authors of the declaration were Balfour, Sykes, Weizmann, and Sokolow, with "perhaps Lord Rothschild as a figure in the background", and that "negotiations seem to have been mainly oral and by means of private notes and memoranda of which only the scantiest records seem to be available."

Following the 1936 general strike that was to degenerate into the 1936–1939 Arab revolt in Palestine, the most significant outbreak of violence since the Mandate began, a British Royal Commission – a high-profile public inquiry – was appointed to investigate the causes of the unrest. The Palestine Royal Commission, appointed with significantly broader terms of reference than the previous British inquiries into Palestine, completed its 404-page report after six months of work in June 1937, publishing it a month later. The report began by describing the history of the problem, including a detailed summary of the origins of the Balfour Declaration. Much of this summary relied on Lloyd-George's personal testimony; Balfour had died in 1930 and Sykes in 1919. He told the commission that the declaration was made "due to propagandist reasons ... In particular Jewish sympathy would confirm the support of American Jewry, and would make it more difficult for Germany to reduce her military commitments and improve her economic position on the eastern front". (Note: The Palestine Royal Commission described Lloyd George's evidence as follows: "In the evidence he gave before us Mr. Lloyd George, who was Prime Minister at the time, stated that, while the Zionist cause had been widely supported in Britain and America before November, 1917, the launching of the Balfour Declaration at that time was "due to propagandist reasons"; and, he outlined the serious position in which the Allied and Associated Powers then were. The Roumanians had been crushed. The Russian Army was demoralized. The French Army was unable at the moment to take the offensive on a large scale. The Italians had sustained a great defeat at Caporetto. Millions of tons of British shipping had been sunk by German submarines. No American divisions were yet available in the trenches. In this critical situation it was believed that Jewish sympathy or the reverse would make a substantial difference one way or the other to the Allied cause. In particular Jewish sympathy would confirm the support of American Jewry, and would make it more difficult for Germany to reduce her military commitments and improve her economic position on the eastern front ... The Zionist leaders [Mr. Lloyd George informed us] gave us a definite promise that, if the Allies committed themselves to giving facilities for the establishment of a national home for the Jews in Palestine, they would do their best to rally Jewish sentiment and support throughout the world to the Allied cause. They kept their word.") Two years later, in his Memoirs of the Peace Conference, (Note: Per Lloyd George's Memoirs of the Peace Conference: "The Balfour Declaration represented the convinced policy of all parties in our country and also in America, but the launching of it in 1917 was due, as I have said, to propagandist reasons ... The Zionist Movement was exceptionally strong in Russia and America ... It was believed, also, that such a declaration would have a potent influence upon world Jewry outside Russia, and secure for the Entente the aid of Jewish financial interests. In America, their aid in this respect would have a special value when the Allies had almost exhausted the gold and marketable securities available for American purchases. Such were the chief considerations which, in 1917, impelled the British Government towards making a contract with Jewry.") Lloyd George described a total of nine factors motivating his decision as Prime Minister to release the declaration, including the additional reasons that a Jewish presence in Palestine would strengthen Britain's position on the Suez Canal and reinforce the route to their imperial dominion in India.

These geopolitical calculations were debated and discussed in the following years. Historians agree that the British believed that expressing support would appeal to Jews in Germany and the United States, given two of Woodrow Wilson's closest advisors were known to be avid Zionists; (Note: Gelvin noted that "The British did not know quite what to make of President Woodrow Wilson and his conviction (before America's entrance into the war) that the way to end hostilities was for both sides to accept "peace without victory." Two of Wilson's closest advisors, Louis Brandeis and Felix Frankfurter, were avid Zionists. How better to shore up an uncertain ally than by endorsing Zionist aims? The British adopted similar thinking when it came to the Russians, who were in the midst of their revolution. Several of the most prominent revolutionaries, including Leon Trotsky, were of Jewish descent. Why not see if they could be persuaded to keep Russia in the war by appealing to their latent Jewishness and giving them another reason to continue the fight? ... These include not only those already mentioned but also Britain's desire to attract Jewish financial resources.") (Note: Schneer described this as follows: "Thus the view from Whitehall early in 1916: If defeat was not imminent, neither was victory; and the outcome of the war of attrition on the Western Front could not be predicted. The colossal forces in a death-grip across Europe and in Eurasia appeared to have canceled each other out. Only the addition of significant new forces on one side or the other seemed likely to tip the scale. Britain's willingness, beginning early in 1916, to explore seriously some kind of arrangement with "world Jewry" or "Great Jewry" must be understood in this context.") they also hoped to encourage support from the large Jewish population in Russia. In addition, the British intended to pre-empt the expected French pressure for an international administration in Palestine. (Note: Grainger writes: "It was later lauded as a great humanitarian gesture and condemned as a wicked plot, but the preceding Cabinet discussions about it show that it was the product of hard-headed political calculation… It was argued that such a declaration would encourage support for the Allies in the United States and in Russia, the two countries in the world which had very large Jewish populations. But behind it all was the knowledge that, if Britain promoted such a policy, it would necessarily be up to her to implement it, and this would in turn mean that she would have to exercise political control over Palestine. One aim of the Balfour Declaration was thus to freeze out France (and anyone else) from any post-war presence in Palestine." and James Barr writes: "To ward off the inevitable French pressure for an international administration once Palestine had been conquered, the British government now made its support for Zionism public.")

Some historians argue that the British government's decision reflected what James Gelvin, Professor of Middle Eastern History at UCLA, calls 'patrician anti-Semitism' in the overestimation of Jewish power in both the United States and Russia. American Zionism was still in its infancy; in 1914 the Zionist Federation had a small budget of about $5,000 and only 12,000 members, despite an American Jewish population of three million (Note: Brysac and Meyer wrote: "As the lawyer and historian David Fromkin has shrewdly noted, out of an estimated three million Jews living in the United States in 1914, a mere twelve thousand belonged to an amateurishly led Zionist Federation, which claimed but five hundred members in New York. Its annual budget prior to 1914 never exceeded $5,200, and the largest single gift it received totalled $200.") but the Zionist organizations had recently succeeded, following a show of force within the American Jewish community, in arranging a Jewish congress to debate the Jewish problem as a whole. (Note: Reinharz described this as follows: "At the Zionist Emergency Conference in August 1914, Poalei-Zion demanded the convening of a Jewish congress which would debate the Jewish problem as a whole ... During a year of fruitless discussions, the AJC would only agree only to a limited convention of specific organizations, rather than a congress based on democratic elections. In March 1916, therefore, the Zionists invited a number of other organizations to set up a congress. The internal strife among American Jewry, which had been so widely feared, broke out in full force ... The elections were held in June, two months after the United States had entered the war; 325,000 voted, 75,000 of whom were from the Zionist workers' camp. This was an impressive demonstration of the ability of the immigrant Zionists to rally massive support. Immediately after came President Wilson's suggestion to Wise not to hold the congress while the war was on, and the opening session was thus postponed from 2 September 1917, until "peace negotiations will be in prospect". The PZCs acceptance of the deferment again aroused the ire of supporters of the congress, who described it as a degrading surrender.") This impacted British and French government estimates of the balance of power within the American Jewish public.

Avi Shlaim, emeritus Professor of International Relations in the University of Oxford, asserts that two main schools of thought have been developed on the question of the primary driving force behind the declaration, one presented in 1961 by Leonard Stein, a lawyer and former political secretary to the World Zionist Organization, and the other in 1970 by Mayir Vereté, then Professor of Israeli History at the Hebrew University of Jerusalem. Shlaim states that Stein does not reach any clear cut conclusions, but that implicit in his narrative is that the declaration resulted primarily from the activity and skill of the Zionists, whereas according to Vereté, it was the work of hard-headed pragmatists motivated by British imperial interests in the Middle East. Much of modern scholarship on the decision to issue the declaration focuses on the Zionist movement and rivalries within it, with a key debate being whether the role of Weizmann was decisive or whether the British were likely to have issued a similar declaration in any event. Danny Gutwein, Professor of Jewish History at the University of Haifa, proposes a twist on an old idea, asserting that Sykes's February 1917 approach to the Zionists was the defining moment, and that it was consistent with the pursuit of the government's wider agenda to partition the Ottoman Empire. (Note: Gutwein described the impact as follows: "Sykes's approach to the Zionist-radical leadership in early 1917 led to a major transformation in Weizmann's political standing. From the outbreak of the war until Asquith's fall, it was Weizmann who sought paths to British statesmen and officials to request their aid, but his efforts were blocked due to his radical positions. Now, it was Sykes who approached Weizmann and Sokolow and requested their assistance to advance radical aims. The co-opting of Weizmann and the Zionist-radicals into Lloyd George's administration transformed them from lobbyists into partners, and Sykes used their help to promote three major goals of the radical policy: the fight against Wilson's "peace without victory" policy; the establishment of "Greater Armenia" as a Russian protectorate that included Turkish Armenia; and the replacement of joint British-French rule in Palestine, in the spirit of the Sykes–Picot Agreement, with an exclusive British protectorate.")

== Long-term impact ==
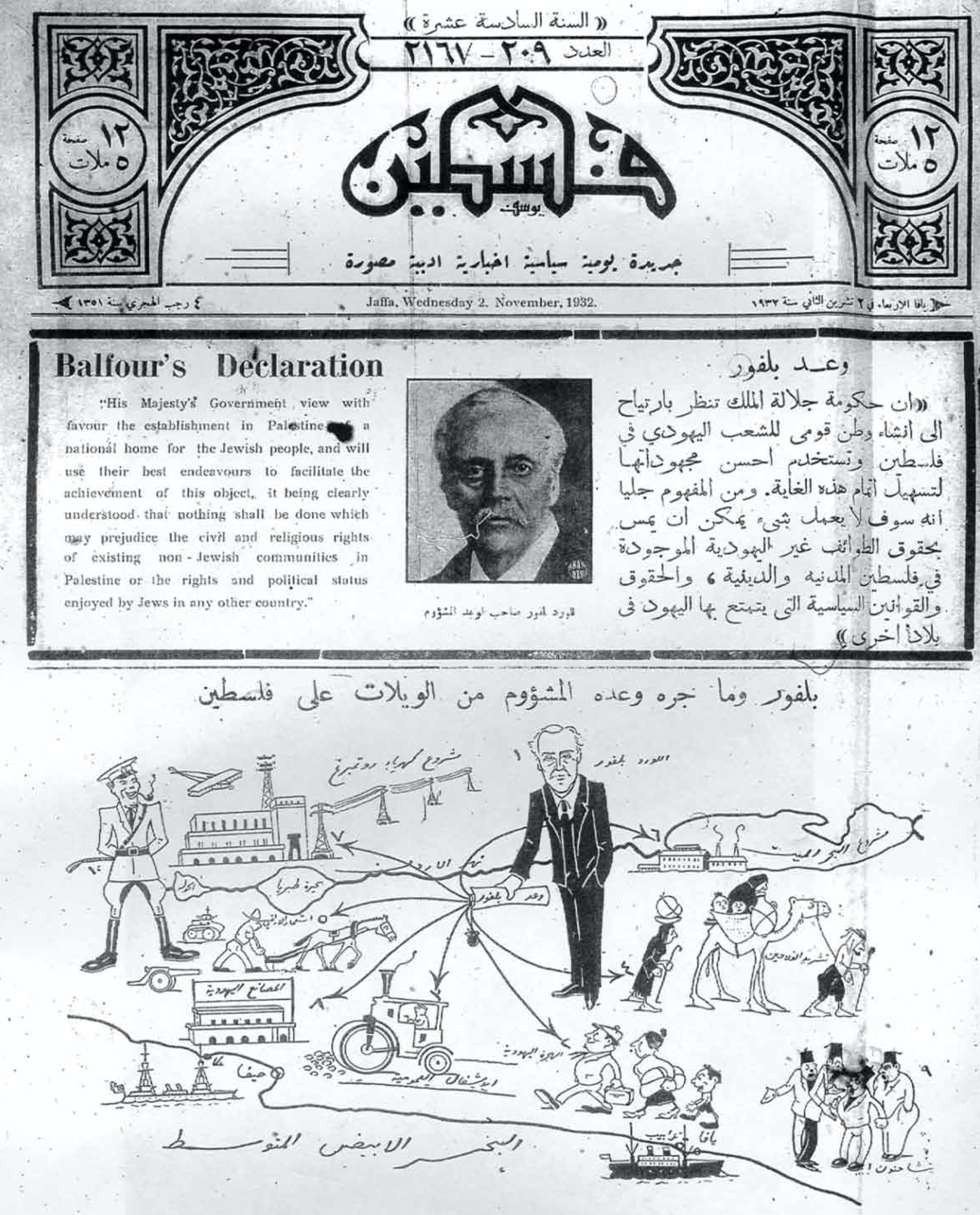
Falastin newspaper edition in 1932 featuring a caricature lamenting Balfour declaration's impacts on Palestine, showing Jewish immigration, and dispossession of Arab peasants

The declaration had two indirect consequences, the emergence of Israel and a chronic state of conflict between Arabs and Jews throughout the Middle East. It has been described as the "original sin" with respect to both Britain's failure in Palestine and for wider events in Palestine. The statement also had a significant impact on the traditional anti-Zionism of religious Jews, some of whom saw it as divine providence; this contributed to the growth of religious Zionism amid the larger Zionist movement. (Note: Israeli professor of sociology Menachem Friedman wrote: "... one cannot overestimate [the declaration's] dramatic influence on the Jewish masses, especially those living in Eastern Europe. Metaphorically speaking, they felt as if they actually heard the beating wings of Redemption. From the theological point of view, the Balfour Declaration was even more significant than Zionist activities in Palestine at that time. Although Zionist enterprise in Palestine was defined as "rebellion" against God and traditional faith in Redemption. Yet the Jew who believes in Divine Providence was almost compelled to believe that the Balfour Declaration was a manifestation of God's Grace. This political phenomenon – which was issued as a result of Zionist lobbying and was addressed to the Zionist Executive – shook the foundations of traditional religious anti-Zionism as much as it encouraged religious Zionism.")

Starting in 1920, intercommunal conflict in Mandatory Palestine broke out, which widened into the regional Arab–Israeli conflict, often referred to as the world's "most intractable conflict". The "dual obligation" to the two communities quickly proved to be untenable; the British subsequently concluded that it was impossible for them to pacify the two communities in Palestine by using different messages for different audiences. (Note: For example, in 1930, on learning that King George V had requested his views about the state of affairs in Palestine, John Chancellor, the High Commissioner for Palestine, wrote a 16-page letter via Lord Stamfordham, the King's Private Secretary. The letter concluded, "The facts of the situation are that in the dire straits of the war, the British Government made promises to the Arabs and promises to the Jews which are inconsistent with one another and are incapable of fulfilment. The honest course is to admit our difficulty and to say to the Jews that, in accordance with the Balfour Declaration, we have favoured the establishment of a Jewish National Home in Palestine and that a Jewish National Home in Palestine has in fact been established and will be maintained and that, without violating the other part of the Balfour Declaration, without prejudicing the interests of the Arabs, we cannot do more than we have done." Renton wrote: "The attempt to create different messages for different audiences regarding the future of the same place, as had been attempted since the fall of Jerusalem, was untenable.") The Palestine Royal Commission – in making the first official proposal for partition of the region – referred to the requirements as "contradictory obligations", and that the "disease is so deep-rooted that, in our firm conviction, the only hope of a cure lies in a surgical operation". Following the 1936–1939 Arab revolt in Palestine, and as worldwide tensions rose in the buildup to the Second World War, the British Parliament approved the White Paper of 1939 – their last formal statement of governing policy in Mandatory Palestine – declaring that Palestine should not become a Jewish State and placing restrictions on Jewish immigration. Whilst the British considered this consistent with the Balfour Declaration's commitment to protect the rights of non-Jews, many Zionists saw it as a repudiation of the declaration. (Note: Principal protagonists' perspectives on the 1939 White Paper: The British, paragraph 6 of the White Paper: "His Majesty's Government adhere to this interpretation of the Declaration of 1917 and regard it as an authoritative and comprehensive description of the character of the Jewish National Home in Palestine."; The Zionists, Response Statement by the Jewish Agency: "The new policy for Palestine laid down by the Mandatory in the White paper now issued denies to the Jewish people the right to rebuild their national home in their ancestral country ..."; The Arabs, from the 1947 UNSCOP discussions: "Since the proposal did not measure up to the political demands proposed by Arab representatives during the London Conference of early 1939, it was officially rejected by the representatives of Palestine Arab parties acting under the influence of Haj Amin Eff el Husseini. More moderate Arab opinion represented in the National Defence Party was prepared to accept the White Paper.") Although this policy lasted until the British surrendered the Mandate in 1948, it served only to highlight the fundamental difficulty for Britain in carrying out the Mandate obligations.

Britain's involvement in this became one of the most controversial parts of its Empire's history and damaged its reputation in the Middle East for generations. (Note: Norman Rose noted: "... for the British the Balfour Declaration inaugurated one of the most controversial episodes in their imperial history. Undone by the complexities of wartime diplomacy, unable to bridge the gap with either of the interested parties, the Declaration impaired their relations with both Palestinian Arabs and Zionists. And no less, it stained Britain's reputation throughout the Arab Middle East for generations to come.") According to historian Elizabeth Monroe: "measured by British interests alone, [the declaration was] one of the greatest mistakes in [its] imperial history" which greatly damaged Britain. However, others argue that this approach ignores the emergence of nationalism and the dismantling of major empires throughout the world, and the Britain would likely not have been able to maintain its presence in the Middle East in any case.

The 2010 study by Jonathan Schneer, specialist in modern British history at Georgia Tech, concluded that because the build-up to the declaration was characterized by "contradictions, deceptions, misinterpretations, and wishful thinking", the declaration sowed dragon's teeth and "produced a murderous harvest, and we go on harvesting even today". (Note: Schneer's conclusion, stated twice in his work, was that: "Because it was unpredictable and characterized by contradictions, deceptions, misinterpretations, and wishful thinking, the lead-up to the Balfour Declaration sowed dragon's teeth. It produced a murderous harvest, and we go on harvesting even today".) The foundational stone for modern Israel had been laid, but the prediction that this would lay the groundwork for harmonious Arab-Jewish cooperation proved to be wishful thinking. (Note: The implementation of the declaration fed a disenchantment among the Arabs that alienated them from the British administrators in Mandatory Palestine. Palestinian historian Rashid Khalidi has argued that following the Balfour Declaration there ensued "what amounts to a hundred years of war against the Palestinian people".)

On the bicentenary of its foundation, the British newspaper The Guardian, reflecting on its major errors of judgment, included the support the paper's editor, C. P. Scott, gave to Balfour's declaration. Israel had not become, it said, 'the country the Guardian foresaw or would have wanted.' The Board of Deputies of British Jews through its president Marie van der Zyl denounced the column as 'breathtakingly ill-considered', declaring that the Guardian appeared "to do everything it can to undermine the legitimacy of the world's only Jewish state".

== The document ==
The document was presented to the British Museum in 1924 by Walter Rothschild; today it is held in the British Library, which separated from the British Museum in 1973, as Additional Manuscripts number 41178. From October 1987 to May 1988 it was lent outside the UK for display in Israel's Knesset.

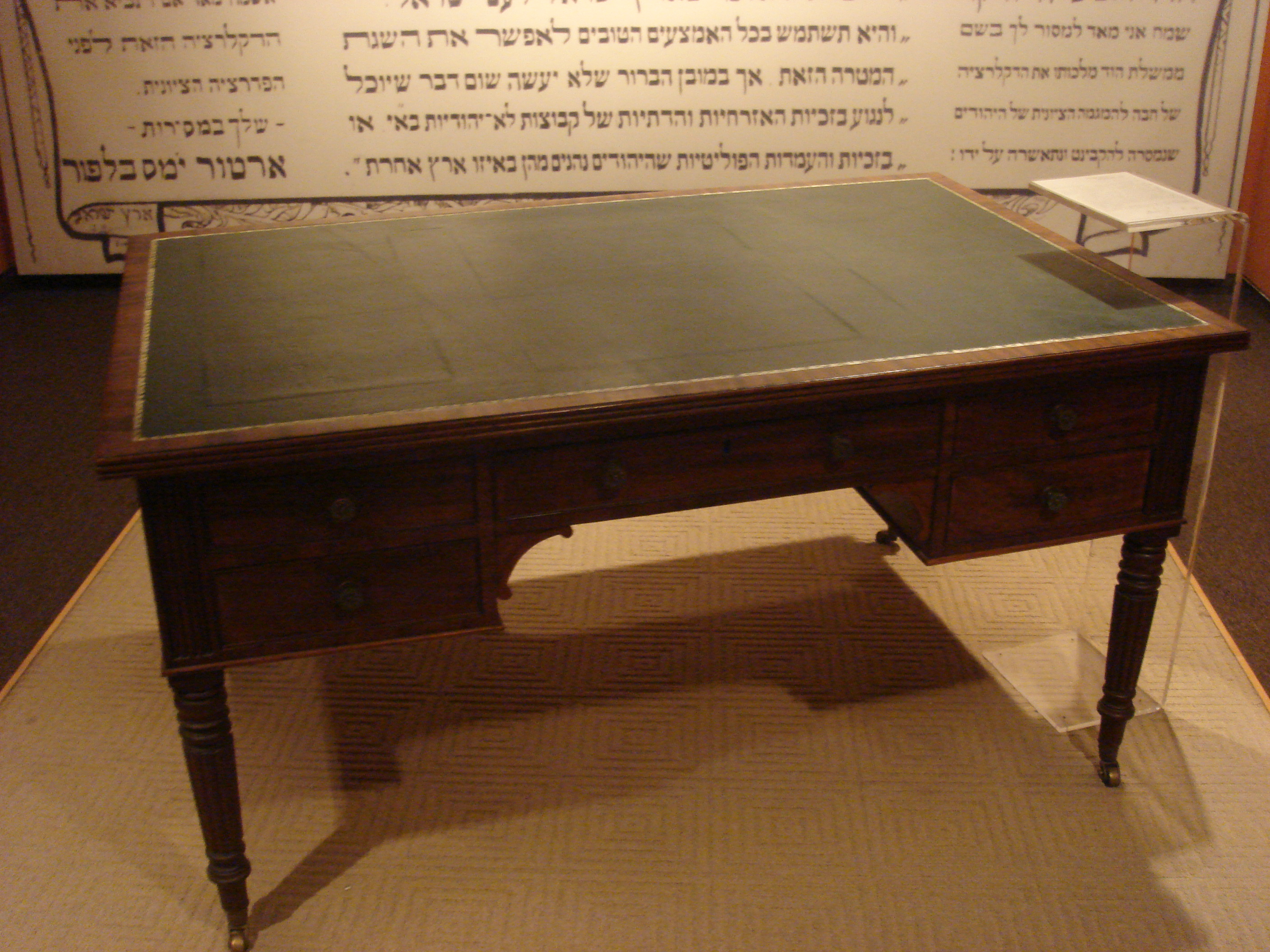
Lord Balfour's desk, in the Museum of the Jewish Diaspora in Tel Aviv

== See also ==
- Diplomatic history of World War I
- Proposals for a Jewish state

== Bibliography ==
=== Specialised works ===
- Adelson, Roger (1995). London and the Invention of the Middle East: Money, Power, and War, 1902–1922. Yale University Press. p. 141. ISBN 978-0-300-06094-2.
- Allawi, Ali A. (2014). Faisal I of Iraq. Yale University Press. pp. 216–. ISBN 978-0-300-19936-9.
- Antonius, George (1938). The Arab Awakening: The Story of the Arab National Movement. Hamish Hamilton. ISBN 978-0-7103-0673-9.
- Bachi, Roberto (1974). The Population of Israel (PDF). Institute of Contemporary Jewry, Hebrew University of Jerusalem. pp. 133, 390–394. OCLC 7924090. Archived from the original (PDF) on 20 October 2023.
- Barr, James (2011). A Line in the Sand: Britain, France and the Struggle that Shaped the Middle East. Simon & Schuster. p. 60. ISBN 978-1-84983-903-7.
- Bassiouni, M. Cherif; Fisher, Eugene M. (2012). "The Arab-Israeli Conflict – Real and Apparent Issues: An Insight Into Its Future from the Lessons of the Past". St. John's Law Review. 44 (3). ISSN 0036-2905.
- Berman, Aaron (1992). Nazism, the Jews and American Zionism, 1933–1988. Wayne State University Press. ISBN 978-0-8143-2232-1.
- Biger, Gideon (2004). The Boundaries of Modern Palestine, 1840–1947. Psychology Press. ISBN 978-0-7146-5654-0.
- Billauer, Barbara P. (2013). "Case-Studies in Scientific Statecraft: Chaim Weizmann and the Balfour Declaration – Science, Scientists and Propaganda" (PDF). Proceedings of the Policy Studies Organization (24). doi:10.2139/ssrn.2327350. Archived (PDF) from the original on 9 October 2022.
- Brysac, Shareen Blair; Meyer, Karl E. (2009). Kingmakers: The Invention of the Modern Middle East. W. W. Norton. ISBN 978-0-393-34243-7.
- McTague, John J. Jr. (Spring 1978). "The British Military Administration in Palestine 1917–1920". Journal of Palestine Studies. 7 (3): 55–76. doi:10.2307/2536201. JSTOR 2536201.
- Brecher, Frank W. (1987). "Woodrow Wilson and the Origins of the Arab-Israeli Conflict". American Jewish Archives. 39 (1): 23–47. ISSN 0002-905X.
- Brecher, F.W. (1993). "French Policy toward the Levant". Middle Eastern Studies. 29 (4): 641–663. doi:10.1080/00263209308700971.
- Büssow, Johann (2011). Hamidian Palestine: Politics and Society in the District of Jerusalem 1872–1908. BRILL. ISBN 978-90-04-20569-7.
- Ciani, Adriano E. (2011). "1". The Vatican, American Catholics and the Struggle for Palestine, 1917–58: A Study of Cold War Roman Catholic Transnationalism (PhD). Electronic Thesis and Dissertation Repository.
- Cohen, Michael; Kolinsky, Martin (2013). Demise of the British Empire in the Middle East: Britain's Responses to Nationalist Movements, 1943–55. Routledge. ISBN 978-1-136-31375-2.
- Cohen, Michael J (2014). Britain's Moment in Palestine: Retrospect and Perspectives, 1917–1948. Routledge. ISBN 978-1-317-91364-1.
- Cooper, John (2015). The Unexpected Story of Nathaniel Rothschild. Bloomsbury Publishing. ISBN 978-1-4729-1708-9.
- Davidson, Lawrence (Spring 2002). "The Past as Prelude: Zionism and the Betrayal of American Democratic Principles, 1917-48". Journal of Palestine Studies. 31 (3): 21–35. doi:10.1525/jps.2002.31.3.21. JSTOR 10.1525/jps.2002.31.3.21.
- Defries, Harry (2014). Conservative Party Attitudes to Jews 1900–1950. Routledge. p. 51. ISBN 978-1-135-28462-6.
- Della Pergola, Sergio (2001). "Demography in Israel/Palestine: Trends, Prospects, Policy Implications" (PDF). International Union for the Scientific Study of Population, XXIV, General Population Conference, Salvador de Bahia. Archived from the original (PDF) on 2 December 2016.
- De Waart, P.J.I.M (1994). Dynamics of Self-determination in Palestine: Protection of Peoples as a Human Right. BRILL. p. 271. ISBN 978-90-04-09825-1.
- Domnitch, Larry (2000). The Jewish Holidays: A Journey Through History. Jason Aronson. ISBN 978-0-7657-6109-5.
- Dugard, John (2013). "A Tale of Two Sacred Trusts: Namibia and Palestine". Law, Politics and Rights. pp. 285–305. doi:10.1163/9789004249004_011. ISBN 978-90-04-24900-4.
- Friedman, Isaiah (1997). Germany, Turkey, and Zionism 1897–1918. Transaction Publishers. ISBN 978-1-4128-2456-9.
- Friedman, Isaiah (2000). Palestine, a Twice-Promised Land: The British, the Arabs & Zionism : 1915–1920. Transaction Publishers. ISBN 978-1-4128-3044-7.
- Friedman, Isaiah (1973). The Question of Palestine: British-Jewish-Arab Relations, 1914–1918. Transaction Publishers. ISBN 978-1-4128-3868-9.
- Friedman, Isaiah (2017). British Pan-Arab Policy, 1915–1922. Taylor & Francis. pp. 277–. ISBN 978-1-351-53064-4.
- Friedman, Menachem (2012). "Israel as a Theological Dilemma". In Baruch Kimmerling (ed.). Israeli State and Society, The: Boundaries and Frontiers. State University of New York Press. ISBN 978-1-4384-0901-6.
- Fromkin, David (1990). A Peace to End All Peace: The Fall of the Ottoman Empire and the Creation of the Modern Middle East. Avon Books. ISBN 978-0-380-71300-4.
- Garfield, Brian (2007). The Meinertzhagen Mystery: The Life and Legend of a Colossal Fraud. Potomac Books Inc. ISBN 978-1-59797-041-9.
- Garfinkle, Adam (1998). "History and Peace: Revisiting two Zionist myths". Israel Affairs. 5 (1): 126–148. doi:10.1080/13537129808719501.
- Gelvin, James L. (1999). "The Ironic Legacy of the King-Crane Commission". In David W. Lesch (ed.). The Middle East and the United States. Westview Press. ISBN 978-0-8133-4349-5.
- Yitzhak Gil-Har (2000). "Boundaries Delimitation: Palestine and Transjordan". Middle Eastern Studies. 36 (1): 68–81. doi:10.1080/00263200008701297. S2CID 143735975.
- Gilmour, David (1996). "The Unregarded Prophet: Lord Curzon and the Palestine Question". Journal of Palestine Studies. 25 (3): 60–68. doi:10.2307/2538259. JSTOR 2538259. S2CID 159464300.
- Glass, Joseph B. (2002). From New Zion to Old Zion: American Jewish Immigration and Settlement in Palestine, 1917–1939. Wayne State University Press. ISBN 978-0-8143-2842-2.
- Grainger, John D. (2006). The Battle for Palestine, 1917. Boydell Press. ISBN 978-1-84383-263-8.
- Gutwein, Danny (2016). "The Politics of the Balfour Declaration: Nationalism, Imperialism and the Limits of Zionist-British Cooperation". Journal of Israeli History. 35 (2): 117–152. doi:10.1080/13531042.2016.1244100. S2CID 157976839.
- Haiduc-Dale, Noah (2013). Arab Christians in British Mandate Palestine: Communalism and Nationalism, 1917–1948: Communalism and Nationalism, 1917–1948. Edinburgh University Press. ISBN 978-0-7486-7604-0.
- Halpern, Ben (1987). A Clash of Heroes: Brandeis, Weizmann, and American Zionism: Brandeis, Weizmann, and American Zionism. Oxford University Press, USA. ISBN 978-0-19-536489-7.
- Hardie, Frank; Herrman, Irwin M. (1980). Britain and Zion: the fateful entanglement. Blackstaff. ISBN 978-0-85640-229-6.
- Helmreich, William (1985). The Third Reich and the Palestine Question. University of Texas Press. ISBN 978-1-351-47272-2.
- Hourani, Albert (1981). The Emergence of the Modern Middle East. University of California Press. ISBN 978-0-520-03862-2.
- Huneidi, Sahar (2001). A Broken Trust: Sir Herbert Samuel, Zionism and the Palestinians. I.B.Tauris. p. 84. ISBN 978-1-86064-172-5.
- Ingrams, Doreen (2009). Palestine papers: 1917–1922: seeds of conflict. Eland. ISBN 978-1-906011-38-3.
- Jeffries, J.M.N. (1939). Palestine: the reality. Hyperion Press. ISBN 978-0-88355-327-5.
- Kattan, Victor (2009). From Coexistence to Conquest: International Law and the Origins of the Arab-Israeli Conflict, 1891–1949. Pluto Press. ISBN 978-0-7453-2579-8.
- Kaufman, Edy (1979). "The French pro-Zionist declarations of 1917–1918". Middle Eastern Studies. 15 (3): 374–407. doi:10.1080/00263207908700418.
- Kedourie, Elie (1976). In the Anglo-Arab Labyrinth: The McMahon-Husayn Correspondence and Its Interpretations 1914–1939. Routledge. ISBN 978-1-135-30842-1.
- Klug, Brian (2012). Being Jewish and Doing Justice: Bringing Argument to Life. Vallentine Mitchell. ISBN 978-0-85303-993-8. Also online at: Biography: Arthur Balfour by Brian Klug | Balfour Project.
- Kreutz, Andrej (1990). Vatican Policy on the Palestinian-Israeli Conflict. Greenwood Press. p. 196. ISBN 978-0-313-26829-8.
- Lebow, Richard Ned (1968). "Woodrow Wilson and the Balfour Declaration". The Journal of Modern History. 40 (4): 501–523. doi:10.1086/240237. JSTOR 1878450. S2CID 144175738.
- Lewis, Donald (2014). The Origins of Christian Zionism: Lord Shaftesbury And Evangelical Support for a Jewish Homeland (PDF). Cambridge University Press. ISBN 978-1-107-63196-0. Archived from the original (PDF) on 12 October 2017.
- Lewis, Geoffrey (2009). Balfour and Weizmann: The Zionist, the Zealot and the Emergence of Israel. A&C Black. ISBN 978-1-84725-040-7.
- Liebreich, Freddy (2004). Britain's Naval and Political Reaction to the Illegal Immigration of Jews to Palestine, 1945–1949. Routledge. ISBN 978-1-135-76694-8.
- Lieshout, Robert H. (2016). Britain and the Arab Middle East: World War I and its Aftermath. I.B.Tauris. ISBN 978-1-78453-583-4.
- Kamel, Lorenzo (2015). Imperial Perceptions of Palestine: British Influence and Power in Late Ottoman Times. British Academic Press. ISBN 978-1-78453-129-4.
- Makovsky, Michael (2007). Churchill's Promised Land: Zionism and Statecraft. Yale University Press. ISBN 978-0-300-11609-0.
- Manuel, Frank E. (1955). "The Palestine Question in Italian Diplomacy". The Journal of Modern History. 27 (3): 263–280. doi:10.1086/237809. S2CID 154362416.
- Mathew, William M. (2013). "The Balfour Declaration and the Palestine Mandate, 1917–1923: British Imperialist Imperatives". British Journal of Middle Eastern Studies. 40 (3): 231–250. doi:10.1080/13530194.2013.791133. S2CID 159474306.
- Mathew, William M. (2011). "War-Time Contingency and the Balfour Declaration of 1917: An Improbable Regression" (PDF). Journal of Palestine Studies. 40 (2): 26–42. doi:10.1525/jps.2011.xl.2.26. JSTOR 10.1525/jps.2011.xl.2.26. Archived (PDF) from the original on 9 October 2022.
- Mendel, Yonatan (2014). The Creation of Israeli Arabic: Security and Politics in Arabic Studies in Israel. Palgrave Macmillan UK. ISBN 978-1-137-33737-5.
- Minerbi, Sergio I. (1990). The Vatican and Zionism:Conflict in the Holy Land, 1895–1925. Oxford University Press. p. 253. ISBN 978-0-19-505892-5.
- Neff, Donald (1995). "The Palestinians and Zionism: 1897–1948". Middle East Policy. 4 (1): 156–174. doi:10.1111/j.1475-4967.1995.tb00213.x.
- Nicosia, Francis R. (2008). Zionism and Anti-Semitism in Nazi Germany. Cambridge University Press. ISBN 978-0-521-88392-4.
- Polkehn, Klaus (1975). "Zionism and Kaiser Wilhelm". Journal of Palestine Studies. 4 (2): 76–90. doi:10.2307/2535838. JSTOR 2535838.
- Posner, Steve (1987). Israel Undercover:Secret Warfare and Hidden Diplomacy in the Middle East. Syracuse University Press. ISBN 978-0-8156-5203-8.
- Quigley, John (2010). The Statehood of Palestine: International Law in the Middle East Conflict. Cambridge University Press. ISBN 978-1-139-49124-2.
- Quigley, John B. (1990). Palestine and Israel: A Challenge to Justice. Duke University Press. p. 10.
- Reid, Walter (2011). Empire of Sand: How Britain Made the Middle East. Birlinn. ISBN 978-0-85790-080-7.
- Reinharz, Jehuda (1988). "Zionism in the USA on the Eve of the Balfour Declaration". Studies in Zionism. 9 (2): 131–145. doi:10.1080/13531048808575933.
- Renton, James (2007). The Zionist Masquerade: The Birth of the Anglo-Zionist Alliance 1914–1918. Palgrave Macmillan. ISBN 978-0-230-54718-6.
- Renton, James (2004). "Reconsidering Chaim Weizmann and Moses Gaster in the Founding Mythology of Zionism". In Berkowitz, Michael (ed.). Nationalism, Zionism and ethnic mobilization of the Jews in 1900 and beyond [electronic resource]. BRILL. pp. 129–151. ISBN 978-90-04-13184-2.
- Renton, James (2016). "Flawed Foundations: The Balfour Declaration and the Palestine Mandate". In Miller, Rory (ed.). Britain, Palestine and Empire: The Mandate Years. Routledge. pp. 15–37. ISBN 978-1-317-17233-8.
- Rhett, Maryanne A. (2015). The Global History of the Balfour Declaration: Declared Nation. Routledge. ISBN 978-1-317-31276-5.
- Rose, Norman (2010). A Senseless, Squalid War: Voices from Palestine, 1890s to 1948. Pimlico. p. 15. ISBN 978-1-84595-079-8.
- Rose, Norman (1973). The Gentile Zionists: A Study in Anglo-Zionist Diplomacy 1929–1939. Routledge. ISBN 978-1-135-15865-1.
- Rosen, Jacob (1988). "Captain Reginald Hall and the Balfour Declaration". Middle Eastern Studies. 24 (1): 56–67. doi:10.1080/00263208808700729. JSTOR 4283222.
- Rovner, Adam (2014). In the Shadow of Zion: Promised Lands Before Israel. New York University Press. ISBN 978-1-4798-1748-1.
- Rubinstein, William (2000). "The Secret of Leopold Amery". Historical Research. 73 (181, June 2000): 175–196. doi:10.1111/1468-2281.00102.
- Said, Edward W. (1979). The Question of Palestine. Vintage Books. ISBN 978-0-679-73988-3.
- Sanders, Ronald (1984). The High Walls of Jerusalem: A History of the Balfour Declaration and the Birth of the British Mandate for Palestine. Holt, Rinehart and Winston. ISBN 978-0-03-053971-8.
- Schneer, Jonathan (2010). The Balfour Declaration: The Origins of the Arab-Israeli Conflict. Random House. ISBN 978-1-4000-6532-5.
- Schölch, Alexander (1992). "Britain in Palestine, 1838–1882: The Roots of the Balfour Policy". Journal of Palestine Studies. 22 (1): 39–56. doi:10.2307/2537686. JSTOR 2537686.
- Shlaim, Avi (2009). Israel and Palestine: Reappraisals, Revisions, Refutations. Verso. ISBN 978-1-84467-366-7.
- Shlaim, Avi (2005). "The Balfour Declaration and its Consequences". In Louis, Wm. Roger (ed.). Yet More Adventures with Brittania: Personalities, Politics and Culture in Britain. I.B.Tauris. pp. 251–270. ISBN 978-1-84511-082-6.
- Sorek, Tamir (2015). Palestinian Commemoration in Israel: Calendars, Monuments, and Martyrs. Stanford University Press. ISBN 978-0-8047-9520-3.
- Smith, Charles D. (2011). "The Historiography of World War I and the Emergence of the Contemporary Middle East". In Israel Gershoni; Amy Singer; Y. Hakan Erdem (eds.). Middle East Historiographies: Narrating the Twentieth Century. University of Washington Press. ISBN 978-0-295-80089-9.
- Strawson, John (2009). Partitioning Palestine: Legal Fundamentalism in the Palestinian-Israeli Conflict. Pluto. ISBN 978-0-7453-2324-4.
- Stein, Leonard (1961). The Balfour Declaration. Simon & Schuster. ISBN 978-965-223-448-3.
- Tamari, Salim (2017). The Great War and the Remaking of Palestine. Univ of California Press. ISBN 978-0-520-29125-6.
- Tessler, Mark (2009). A History of the Israeli-Palestinian Conflict Second Edition. Indiana University Press. p. 1018. ISBN 978-0-253-22070-7.
- Tomes, Jason (2002). Balfour and Foreign Policy: The International Thought of a Conservative Statesman. Cambridge University Press. ISBN 978-0-521-89370-1.
- Toury, Jacob (1968). "Organizational Problems of German Jewry: Steps towards the Establishment of a Central Organization (1893–1920)". Yearbook of the Leo Baeck Institute. 13 (1): 57–90. doi:10.1093/leobaeck/13.1.57.
- Tucker, Spencer C. (2017). "35. Is the Balfour Declaration of 1917 to Blame for the Long-Running Arab-Israeli Conflict?". Enduring Controversies in Military History: Critical Analyses and Context. ABC-CLIO. pp. 469–482. ISBN 978-1-4408-4120-0.
- Ulrichsen, Kristian; Ulrichsen, Kristian Coates (2014). The First World War in the Middle East. Hurst. ISBN 978-1-84904-274-1.
- Vereté, Mayir [in Hebrew] (1970). "The Balfour Declaration and Its Makers". Middle Eastern Studies. 6 (1): 48–76. doi:10.1080/00263207008700138. JSTOR 4282307.
- Wasserstein, Bernard (1991). The British in Palestine: The Mandatory Government and Arab-Jewish Conflict, 1917–1929. B. Blackwell. ISBN 978-0-631-17574-2.
- Wavell, Field Marshal Earl (1968) [1933]. "The Palestine Campaigns". In Sheppard, Eric William (ed.). A Short History of the British Army (4th ed.). Constable & Co. OCLC 35621223.
- Wilson, Mary Christina (1990). King Abdullah, Britain and the Making of Jordan. Cambridge University Press. ISBN 978-0-521-39987-6.
- Woodfin, E. (2012). Camp and Combat on the Sinai and Palestine Front: The Experience of the British Empire Soldier, 1916–18. Springer. ISBN 978-1-137-26480-0.
- Woodward, David R. (1998). Field Marshal Sir William Robertson: Chief of the Imperial General Staff in the Great War. Praeger. ISBN 978-0-275-95422-2.
- Zieger, Robert H. (2001). America's Great War: World War I and the American Experience. Rowman & Littlefield. ISBN 978-0-8476-9645-1.
- Talhami, Ghada Hashem (2017). American Presidents and Jerusalem. Lexington Books. ISBN 978-1-4985-5429-9.
- Jacobs, Matthew F. (2011). Imagining the Middle East: The Building of an American Foreign Policy, 1918–1967. University of North Carolina Press. ISBN 978-0-8078-6931-4.
- Auron, Yair (2017). The Banality of Indifference: Zionism and the Armenian Genocide. Routledge. ISBN 978-1-351-30538-9.
- Schmidt, David W. (2011). Partners Together in This Great Enterprise. Xulon Press. ISBN 978-1-61996-058-9.
- Huneidi, Sahar (1998). "Was Balfour Policy Reversible? The Colonial Office and Palestine, 1921–23" (PDF). Journal of Palestine Studies. 27 (2): 23–41. doi:10.2307/2538282. JSTOR 2538282. Archived (PDF) from the original on 9 October 2022.
- Quigley, John (2011). "Britain's Secret Re-Assessment of the Balfour Declaration. The Perfidy of Albion". Journal of the History of International Law. 13 (2): 249–283. doi:10.1163/15718050-13020001.
- Cohen, Michael J. (2010). "Was the Balfour Declaration at risk in 1923? Zionism and British imperialism". Journal of Israeli History. 29 (1).
- Johnson, Paul (2013). History of the Jews. Orion. ISBN 978-1-78022-669-9.
- Pedersen, Susan (2015). The Guardians: The League of Nations and the Crisis of Empire. OUP Oxford. ISBN 978-0-19-100940-2.
- Mousa, Suleiman (1978). "A Matter of Principle: King Hussein of the Hijaz and the Arabs of Palestine". International Journal of Middle East Studies. 9 (2): 183–194. doi:10.1017/S0020743800000052. S2CID 163677445.
- Paris, Timothy J. (2003). Britain, the Hashemites, and Arab Rule, 1920–1925: The Sherifian Solution. Frank Cass. ISBN 978-0-7146-5451-5.

=== General histories ===
- Bickerton, Ian J.; Klausner, Carla L. (2016). A History of the Arab-Israeli Conflict. Taylor & Francis. ISBN 978-1-315-50939-6.
- Caplan, Neil (2011). The Israel-Palestine Conflict: Contested Histories. John Wiley & Sons. ISBN 978-1-4443-5786-8.
- Cleveland, William L.; Bunton, Martin (2016). A History of the Modern Middle East. Avalon Publishing. ISBN 978-0-8133-4980-0.
- Cohen, Michael J. (1989). The Origins and Evolution of the Arab-Zionist Conflict. University of California Press. ISBN 978-0-520-90914-4.
- Dockrill, Michael L.; Lowe, Cedric James (2001) [1972]. Mirage of Power, Part II. Routledge. ISBN 978-1-136-46774-5.
- Dockrill, Michael L.; Lowe, Cedric James (2002) [1972]. Mirage of Power, Part III. Routledge. ISBN 978-1-136-46802-5.
- Geddes, Charles L. (1991). A Documentary History of the Arab-Israeli Conflict. Greenwood Publishing Group. ISBN 978-0-275-93858-1.
- Gelvin, James (2014) [2002]. The Israel-Palestine Conflict: One Hundred Years of War (3 ed.). Cambridge University Press. ISBN 978-0-521-85289-0.
- Hurewitz, J. C. (1979). The Middle East and North Africa in World Politics: A Documentary Record – British-French Supremacy, 1914–1945. Yale University Press. ISBN 978-0-300-02203-2.
- Kedourie, Elie (2013) [1982]. Palestine and Israel in the 19th and 20th Centuries. Routledge. ISBN 978-1-135-16814-8.
- Khouri, Fred John (1985). The Arab-Israeli Dilemma. Syracuse University Press. ISBN 978-0-8156-2340-3.
- Laqueur, Walter; Schueftan, Dan (2016). The Israel-Arab Reader: A Documentary History of the Middle East Conflict: Eighth Revised and Updated Edition. Penguin Publishing Group. ISBN 978-1-101-99241-8.
- Laurens, Henry (1999). La Question de Palestine – Tome 1 – L'invention de la Terre sainte (1799–1922) [In French]. Fayard. ISBN 978-2-213-70357-2.
- Lebel, Jennie (2007). Until the Final Solution: The Jews in Belgrade 1521–1942. Avotaynu. ISBN 978-1-886223-33-2.
- LeVine, Mark; Mossberg, Mathias (2014). One Land, Two States: Israel and Palestine as Parallel States. University of California Press. ISBN 978-0-520-95840-1.
- Makdisi, Saree (2010). Palestine Inside Out: An Everyday Occupation. W. W. Norton. ISBN 978-0-393-33844-7.
- Mansfield, Peter (1992). The Arabs. Penguin Books. ISBN 978-0-14-014768-1.
- Mitrović, Bojan (2016). "Jewish Identity and the Competing National Projects in the Western Balkans (1848–1929)". In Catalan, Tullia; Dogo, Marco (eds.). The Jews and the Nation-States of Southeastern Europe from the 19th Century to the Great Depression: Combining Viewpoints on a Controversial Story. Cambridge Scholars Publishing. pp. 51–72. ISBN 978-1-4438-9662-7.
- Monroe, Elizabeth (1981). Britain's Moment in the Middle East, 1914–1971. Johns Hopkins University Press. ISBN 978-0-8018-2616-0.
- Penslar, Derek (2007). Israel in History: The Jewish State in Comparative Perspective. Routledge. ISBN 978-1-134-14669-7.
- Quigley, Carroll (1981). The Anglo-American Establishment. Books in Focus. ISBN 978-0-945001-01-0.
- Rock, Jonna (2019). Intergenerational Memory and Language of the Sarajevo Sephardim. New York City: Palgrave Macmillan. ISBN 978-3-03014-046-5.
- Shapira, Anita (2012). Israel: A History. UPNE. ISBN 978-1-61168-353-0.
- Smith, Charles D. (2016). Palestine and the Arab-Israeli Conflict: A History with Documents. Bedford/St. Martin's. ISBN 978-1-319-02805-3.
- Stein, Leslie (2003). The Hope Fulfilled: The Rise of Modern Israel. Greenwood Publishing Group. ISBN 978-0-275-97141-0.
- Wasserstein, Bernard (2008). Israel and Palestine: Why They Fight and Can They Stop?. Profile Books. ISBN 978-1-84668-092-2.
- Watts, Tim (2008). "The Balfour Declaration". In Spencer C. Tucker; Priscilla Roberts (eds.). The Encyclopedia of the Arab-Israeli Conflict: A Political, Social, and Military History [4 volumes]: A Political, Social, and Military History. ABC-CLIO. ISBN 978-1-85109-842-2.

=== Works by involved parties ===
- Amery, Leopold (1953). My Political Life: War and peace, 1914–1929. Hutchinson. OCLC 458439494.
- Balfour, Arthur (1928). Israel Cohen (ed.). Speeches on Zionism; with a foreword by Sir Herbert Samuel. Arrowsmith. OCLC 170849.
- Cohen, Israel (1946). The Zionist Movement. Edited and Revised with Supplementary Chapter on Zionism in the United States. Zionist Organization of America. OCLC 906137115.
- Curzon, George (1917). "The Future of Palestine, GT 2406, CAB 24/30/6". UK National Archives.
- de Haas, Jacob (1929). Louis D(embitz) Brandeis. Bloch. OCLC 1550172.
- Leslie, Shane (1923). Mark Sykes: His Life and Letters. Charles Scribner's Sons. OCLC 656769736. Also online at Internet Archive.
- Lloyd George, David (1933). War Memoirs of David Lloyd George: 1915–1916. Little, Brown, and Company. .
- Lloyd George, David (1939). Memoirs of the Peace Conference. Vol. II. New Haven: Yale University Press. OCLC 655133488.
- Meinertzhagen, Richard (1959). Middle East Diary, 1917–1956. Cresset Press. OCLC 397539.
- Palin Commission (1920), Report of the Court of Inquiry Convened by Order of His Excellency the High Commissioner and Commander-in Chief, also known as the "Palin Report", PRO, FO 371/5121, file E9379/85/44, UK National Archives, " The full text of Palin Report at Wikisource. For further information see the Commission's Wikipedia article at Palin Commission"
- Palestine Royal Commission (1937), Cmd. 5479, Palestine Royal Commission Report, also known as the "Peel Report" (PDF), HMSO, archived (PDF) from the original on 9 October 2022, "For further information see the Commission's Wikipedia article at Peel Commission"
- Samuel, Herbert (1945). Memoirs. Cresset Press. OCLC 575921.
- Sokolow, Nahum (1919). History of Zionism 1600–1918: Volume II. Longmans, Green & Co.
- Storrs, Ronald (1943). Lawrence of Arabia: Zionism and Palestine. Penguin Books. OCLC 977422365.
- United Nations Division for Palestinian Rights (1978), "Part I", The Origins and Evolution of the Palestine Problem, United Nations online
- UNSCOP (1947), "United Nations Special Committee on Palestine, Report to the General Assembly, Volume 1; A/364", Official Records of the Second Session of the General Assembly, United Nations
- Weizmann, Chaim (1949). Trial and Error, The Autobiography of Chaim Weizmann. Jewish Publication Society of America. OCLC 830295337.
- Weizmann, Chaim (1983). The Letters and Papers of Chaim Weizmann: August 1898 – July 1931. Transaction Publishers. ISBN 978-0-87855-279-5.
