= Charles Debbas =

President of Lebanon from 1926 to 1934

His Excellency Charles Debbas
- شارل دباس
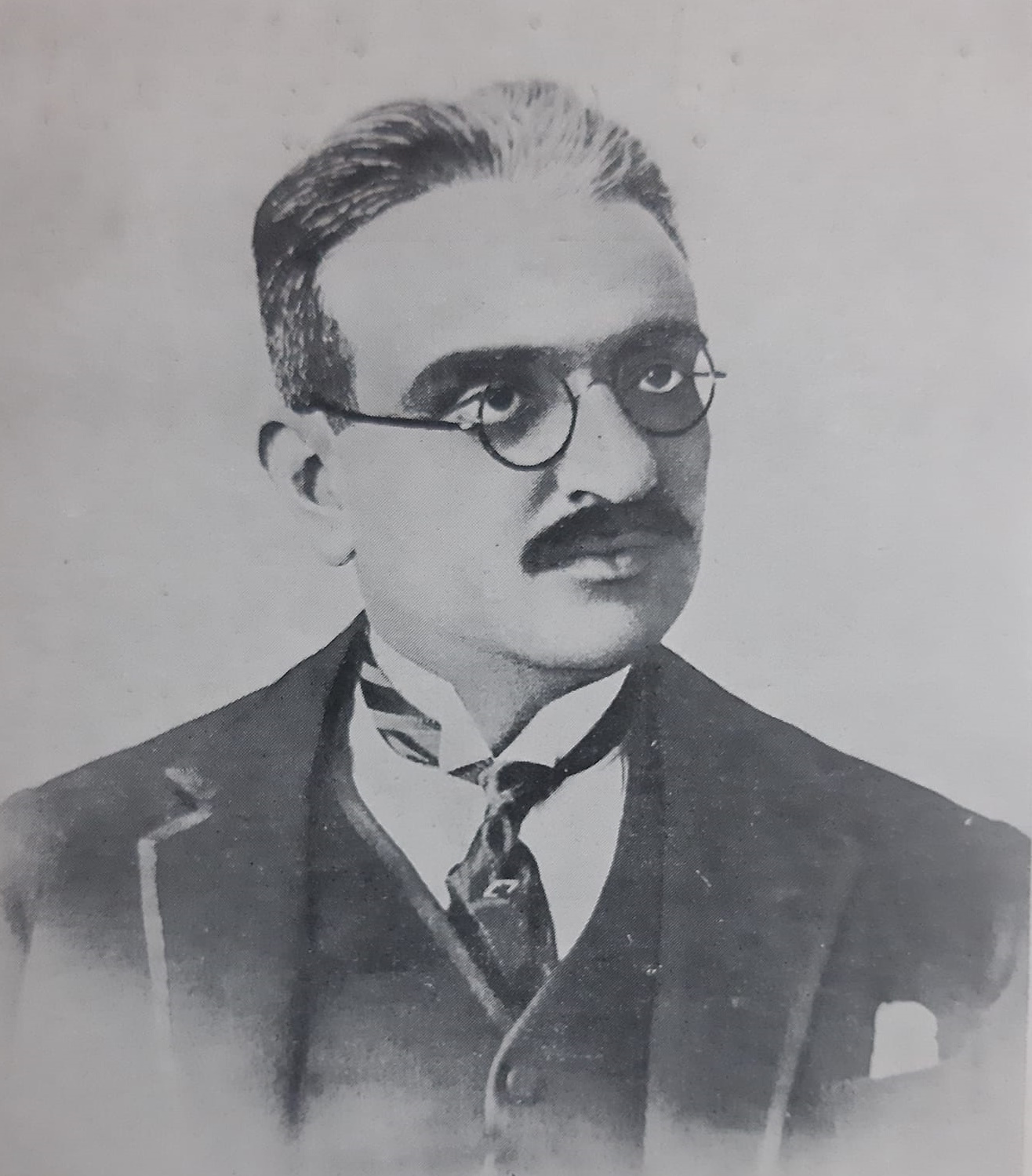
- Debbas in 1934

Speaker of the Parliament of Lebanon
- In office 30 January 1934 – 31 October 1934
- Succeeded by: Petro Trad

1st President of Lebanon
- In office 1 September 1926 – 2 January 1934
- Succeeded by: Antoine Privat-Aubouard (acting)

Personal details
- Born: 16 April 1884 Beirut, Ottoman Empire
- Died: 22 August 1935 (aged 51) Paris, France
- Resting place: Beirut, Lebanon
- Spouse: Marcelle Burgart (m. 1919)

Charles Debbas (Arabic: شارل دباس, romanized: Shārl Dabbās; 16 April 1884 (Note: This date is mentioned in his marriage certificate as well as on his tombstone. His death certificate mentions a different and less precise date: September 1885.) – 22 August 1935) was a Greek Orthodox Lebanese political figure. He was the first President of Lebanon (before independence) and served from 1 September 1926 to 2 January 1934, under the French Mandate of Lebanon (known as Greater Lebanon). He also served as the Speaker of the Parliament of Lebanon from January to October 1934.

== Life ==
=== Background and education ===
Charles Debbas was born in Beirut to a prominent Greek Orthodox Beiruti family. He was the son of Gerges Khalil Debbas (1845–1912) and Marie Salim Jbeili. His grandfather Khalil Debbas (1823–1885)'s brother was J. Abdo Debbas, who served as American vice-consul in Tarsus.

He was a pupil at the Collège des Jésuites. Having obtained his baccalaureate at fourteen and a half years old, he went to study law in Montpellier then in Paris. While he was a student, he met Marcelle Burgart (1892–1960), a nurse taking lessons at the Comédie française. The couple began to live in Beirut, Debbas working there as an attorney.

=== Early political involvement ===
While in Beirut, Debbas became involved in nationalist circles which had become increasingly active in Ottoman Syria since the Young Turk Revolution. He began to write articles in the Beirut-based French-language newspaper La Liberté ('Freedom') which had been founded in 1908 by Butrus Mansur Tayyan. One of his articles, "Le langage de l'ancien régime reviendrait-il en honneur ?" ('Could the old [i.e. Hamidian] regime's language be returning to honour?'), published 3 June 1909, was deemed subversive by the wali of Beirut, Edhem Bey, who warned him of further consequences should he continue to defend the ideas contained in it. Debbas responded in the press that he stood by what he had written and that the wali should submit the matter to court if he thought his article had infringed the law. (Note: La Liberté was shut down by the Ottoman authorities shortly after.) Debbas returned to Paris in 1913 as secretary of the Arab Congress. He became a member of the Central Syrian Committee during World War I. Debbas had returned to Paris on 5 October 1919, and married Burgart on 24 October in Neuilly-sur-Seine.

=== Administrative and political career ===
On 20 October 1920, Debbas was appointed Director of Judicial Services of Greater Lebanon by Robert de Caix, the Secretary General of the High Commissioner.

On 26 May 1926, three days after the adoption of the Lebanese constitution, Debbas was elected President of Lebanon by both Chambers of the Parliament reunited in a Congress, for a three-year term. (Note: The constitutional amendments of 8 May 1929 would fix the duration of presidential term to six years, without being applicable to Debbas' second term.) Quoting Dib, "to provide balance with the Maronite leadership, between 1926 and 1930, Debbas allowed Bechara al-Khouri and his nemesis Emile Éddé to take turns to act as prime ministers. Eventually, al-Khouri emerged as the stronger leader as he was backed by the Chihas and their millionaire cousins the Faraoun family."

Debbas was re-elected president on 23 March 1929 by the Chamber of Deputies (which had become the sole organ of the legislative power per the constitutional amendment of 17 October 1927), by 42 votes out of 44, for another three years.

On 9 May 1932, High Commissioner Henri Ponsot suspended Lebanon's constitution and extended Debbas' second term by one year in reaction to the budget crisis and the possibility that a Muslim, Muhammad al-Jisr, might win the presidential election. On 2 January 1934, Debbas delivered a letter of resignation from his presidential functions; he was replaced by Habib Pacha Saad. Debbas became President of the Chamber of Deputies (Speaker) a few days later, and remained in that position until October; he was replaced by Petro Trad.

=== Death and funeral ===
Debbas sailed to France in April 1935 in order to stay there for six months but died on 22 August of that year, in the 16th arrondissement of Paris, 6 rue Piccini. A funeral service was held for him at the Greek Orthodox Church of Saint Stephen in the presence of Henri Gouraud, François Pierre-Alype, Taj al-Din al-Hasani and delegates of the French president and of various French ministers. Debbas' body was then taken aboard the Mariette-Pacha to Beirut, arriving there on 30 September. A funeral wake was held and Patriarch Alexander III of Antioch gave Debbas absolution the following day in the Greek Orthodox Cathedral of Saint George. Three speeches were then given (Note: By Lagarde (delegate general of the High Commissioner), by the amir Shihab and by Dr Fayyad.) at Mar Mitr (Saint Demetrios) cemetery, (Note: Among the attendees were the presidents of the Lebanese and Syrian Republics (i.e, Habib Pacha Saad and Muhammad Ali Bey al-Abid who had come specially from Damascus).) where Debbas is buried.

== Masonic activities ==
Debbas was a member of Freemasonry, initiated in 1907 at the Masonic Lodge Le Liban located in Beirut under the jurisdiction of the Grand Orient de France.

== Legacy ==
Among the measures instituted under Debbas' presidency is the compulsory baccalaureate for the exercise of liberal professions.

== Distinctions ==
- Commander of the Legion of Honour (1927)
- Grand Cross of the Order of the Black Star (1934)

== Sources ==
- Ammoun, Denise (2014). Histoire du Liban contemporain (in French).
- Browne, Walter L. (1976). The Political History of Lebanon. Vol. 1.
- Dib, Kamal (2004). Warlords and Merchants.
- Kassir, Samir (2011). Beirut. University of California Press. ISBN 9780520271265.
- Khaïrallah, K[haïrallah] T[annous] (1912). La Syrie (in French). Paris: Ernest Leroux.
- Rabbath, Edmond (1982). La Constitution libanaise (in French). Publications de l'Université Libanaise.
- Samné, Georges (January 1934). "Politique et personnel". Correspondance d'Orient (in French). No. 433. pp. 1–4.
- S[amné], G[eorges] (September 1935). "Charles Debbas". Correspondance d'Orient (in French). No. 453. pp. 400–401.
- Skahill, Carolyn (2003). A Historical Atlas of Lebanon.
- Thompson, Elizabeth (2000). Colonial Citizens.

Preceded by N/A	President of Lebanon; 1 September 1926 – 2 January 1934	Succeeded by Antoine Privat-Aubouard (acting)

- Media related to Charles Debbas at Wikimedia Commons
