= Young Muslims Association =

Islamic organization based in Egypt

The Young Muslims Association (Arabic: جمعية الشبان المسلمين) was a group founded in 1927 in Egypt at the impetus of Muhibb al-Din al-Khatib that was a predecessor organization to the Muslim Brotherhood and included Hassan al-Banna in its founding members. After a few month, al-Banna left the group to found his own organization, the Muslim Brotherhood, but continued writing in the Young Muslims Association's Magazine. The early activities of the group during the late 1920s and 1930s are quasi-indistinguishable from those of the Muslim Brotherhood. The leader of the YMA in Palestine was Izz al-din Qassam.

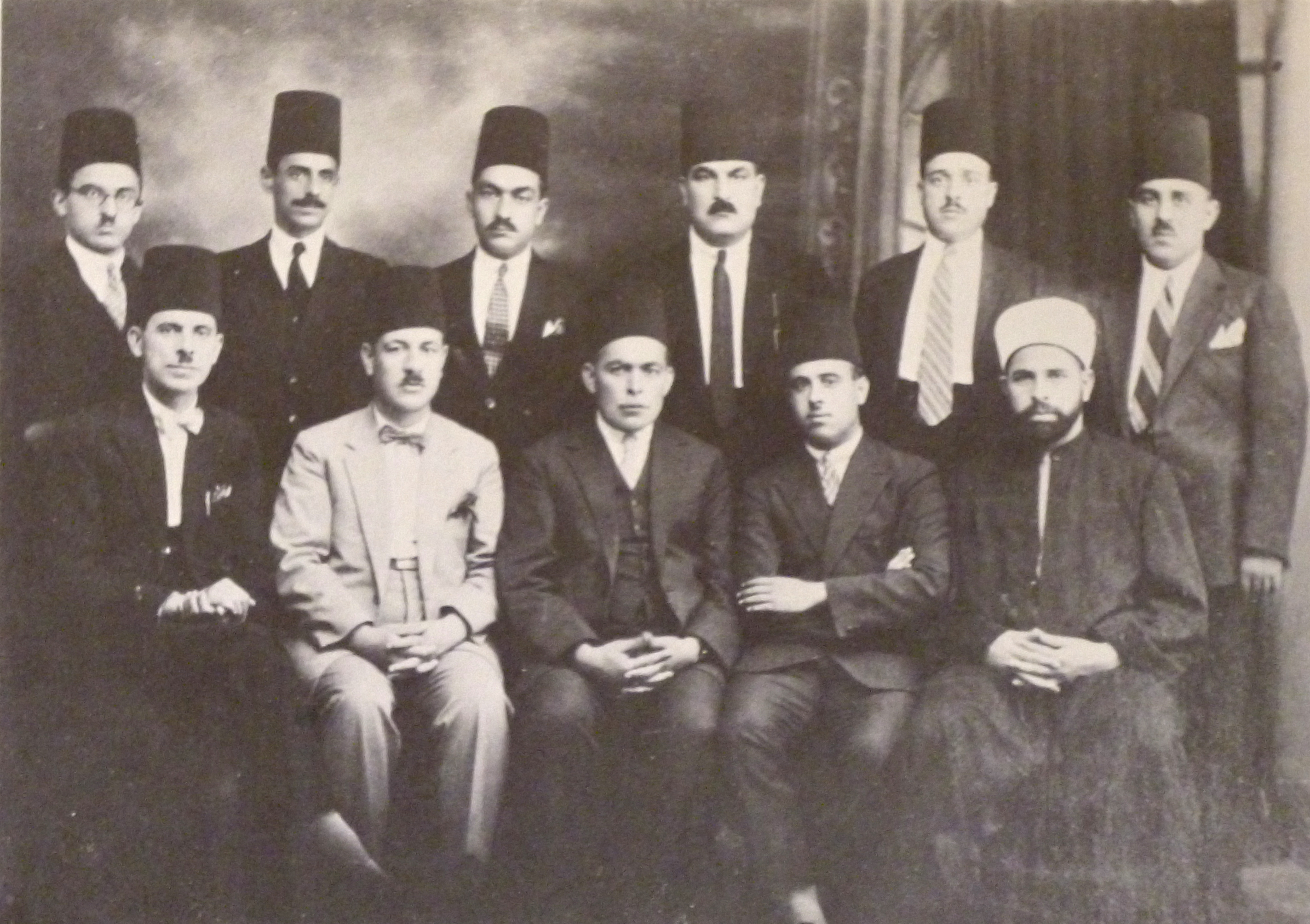
YMMA, Acre, 1928

Muhib ad-Din al-Khatib had participated in the founding of several similar political associations before, beginning with the Young Arab Society (al-Arabiya al-Fatat) founded in Paris 1911 at the impetus of France, and the pro-Entente group called the Decentralization Party which was founded in Cairo in 1913 and had Rashid Rida amongst its members, all of whom were sentenced to death in absentia by the Ottoman authorities during WWI for their alignment with Britain.

== Name change and current activities ==
On 29 June 2019, the name of the association was changed to هيئة الشبان العالمية, Hayaat ash-Shuban al-Alamiya the International Youth Agency.

== See also ==
- Jong Islamieten Bond, similar organization established in the Dutch East Indies in 1925.
- Ansar as-Sunna al-Muhammadiya, an association founded in 1926 in Cairo with more pronounced Salafist leanings.
- Muslim Brotherhood
- Arab Congress of 1913
- Party of Decentralization
- The Young Arab
