= George Lutfallah =

Lebanese socialite and political aspirant

Georges Lutfallah
- جورج لطف الله
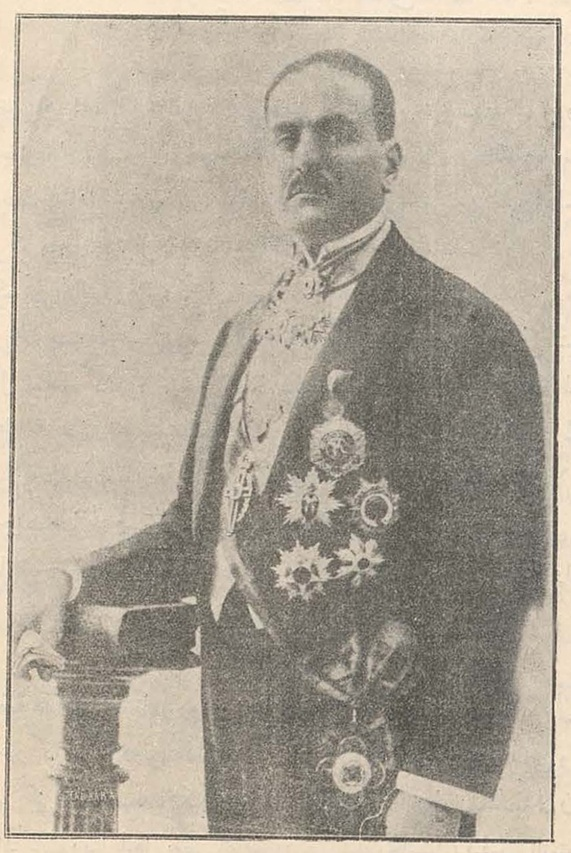
- Lutfallah in 1928
- Died: 20 June 1941; London
- Citizenship: Egyptian and Lebanese
- Occupations: Socialite and politician
- Known for: Attempt to establish a monarchy in Lebanon during the French Mandate
- Title: Prince, Emir, Pasha

George Lutfallah (Arabic: جورج لطف الله), also known as Prince George Lutfallah, was a Lebanese-Egyptian businessman who unsuccessfully sought the presidency of Lebanon during the French Mandate for Syria and the Lebanon. A member of the wealthy Lutfallah family, he campaigned for the presidency in 1928–1929 and also supported the establishment of a monarchy in Lebanon. His campaign ended following the re-election of Charles Debbas in March 1929. Lutfallah died in London on 20 June 1941.

== Family background ==
George was born to Habib Pasha Lutfallah, a Lebanese Greek Orthodox expatriate in Cairo. Habib, originally from a modest background, left for Egypt in 1845, where he amassed considerable wealth by lending money during the Anglo-Egyptian campaign in Sudan. He later invested heavily in cotton culture, which made him one of Egypt’s richest landowners. From 1908 onward, he cultivated close relations with Hussein bin Ali, King of Hejaz, acting both as his banker and advisor, and received from him the honorific hereditary title of Emir (prince). Habib also associated himself with Khedive Ismail of Egypt. In 1919, he acquired the Gezirah Palace whom the indebted Khedive had built for Eugénie de Montijo, the Empress of the French, for her visit to inaugurate the Suez Canal in 1869, and made it his private residence, and hosted dignitaries, literary salons, and banquets.

George's eldest brother, Michel, married into a wealthy Alexandrian merchant family, and became a prominent Syrian unity advocate. During the First World War he carried out publicity and fundraising in support of the Arab revolt and later co-founded the Party of Syrian Unity in Cairo. After the war he was the driving force behind the Syrian-Palestinian Congress, serving as president of its Executive Committee, with himself and George acting as its principal financiers. He maintained a close political alliance with Syrian nationalist Abdul Rahman Shahbandar, supporting him financially during his exiles.

== Political ambitions ==
=== Presidential candidacy ===
Lutfallah's entry into Lebanese politics had already been unfolding since 1927. Together with his wealthy father-in-law Najib Sursock, he attempted to convince French High Commissioner of the Levant Henri Ponsot to back his candidacy for the Lebanese presidency. The French, wary of the Lutfallah family’s earlier hostility during the Great Syrian Revolt, nevertheless kept lines of communication open, partly to unsettle the anti-French mandate Syrian Committee in Cairo. Railway projects linking Tripoli, Beirut and Palestine served as a pretext for his talks with Ponsot. In September 1927, he and Sursock accompanied French senator Étienne Lamercy on a mission to the mandated territories, where Sursock assured French officials of the family’s readiness to cooperate if George were supported as president, or even to put himself forward should Ponsot refuse.

By mid-1928, these manoeuvres were unsettling to then-Lebanese President Charles Debbas, who feared Lutfallah’s wealth, Sursock’s influence in Beirut, and their French connections. Lutfallah’s high-profile visit to Beirut on his way to Paris that summer, followed by a return voyage in December on the same ship as Ponsot, caused Debbas particular alarm.

=== Royal aspirations ===
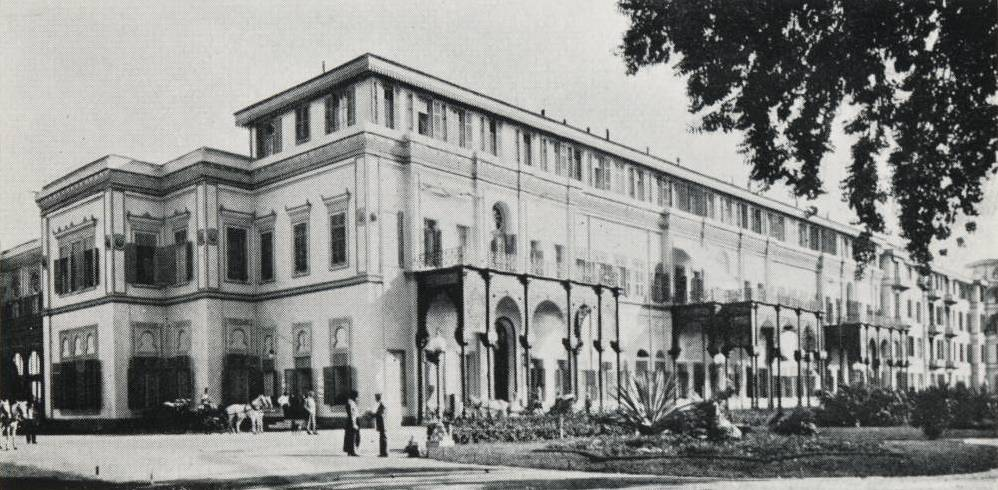
The Gezirah Palace in Zamalek, Egypt

The idea of establishing a principality in Lebanon, by reviving echoes of the old Emirate of Mount Lebanon and invoking the precedent of monarchies in the Arab region, was promoted by the Lebanese Maronite intellectual Habib Bustani, who founded a monarchist party of which he was the sole member. Bustani called for the creation of a principality with a Christian ruler from a European royal family. The party remained largely inactive and disappeared after his death. Later, Khedive Abbas II, who had been exiled from Egypt by the British in the aftermath of World War I, reportedly sought to buy a throne in Lebanon, but this plan did not materialize.

As the end of Charles Debbas' presidential term approached in 1929, no other candidates had come forward. According to Riachi, it was widely accepted that Ponsot, effectively controlled the presidency, while the parliament merely ratified the choice in a formal vote. At a banquet held at George Lutfallah's Gezirah Palace residence in Cairo, Antoine Gemayel, a Lebanese journalist, mused about establishing a monarchy in Lebanon, with his immensely rich host as king. According to Riachi, Lutfallah reacted enthusiastically, reportedly striking the table and proclaiming that if no one else proposed a monarchy, he would do so himself and serve as its candidate. He stated that he would follow the example of Napoleon III, declaring that the presidency could serve as a stepping stone to kingship. In Beirut, Lutfallah established himself in Beirut’s Sursock neighborhood where he rented out a Sursock property, withdrew large sums of money from banks, and hosted politicians, journalists, and notables, showering them with gifts and meals prepared by the renowned chef Tanios al-Shamali. In Paris, Lutfallah held a grand dinner in honor of a secretary at the French Foreign Ministry, during which he hid a rare pearl necklace in the handkerchief of the official's wife. The lady was reportedly so astonished that she could not conceal her emotion, and the incident was reported in the press the following day. Media outlets claimed that the Lutfallah and his brother had reached an understanding in Paris with the French Foreign Ministry, securing his designation as the next President of the Lebanese Republic. In fact, Lutfallah had paid large sums, including £30,000 to a senior official at the French Foreign Ministry, for a letter of support of his presidential aspirations that ultimately turned out to be forged. Lutfallah spent heavily on his campaign. He hosted banquets, received political delegations and promised to use his wealth for Lebanon's economic development. Zamir also describes payments to journalists and politicians and a press campaign promoting Lutfallah while attacking Debbas. His candidacy, however, was hindered by the fact that he lacked formal Lebanese citizenship, a point that his followers contested in the press and in petitions, comparing his case to that of newly naturalized Armenian refugees. In Paris, his agent Georges Enkiri lobbied French officials for support.

Despite Lutfallah's efforts and spending, Ponsot who feared that the latter's campaign was gaining too much momentum, eventually ignored his claim to candidacy, which collapsed after the forged documents were uncovered. Ponsot who had previously maintained a cautious stance, eventually chose to intervene to prevent prolonged instability. He advanced the presidential election to the earliest date permitted under the constitution. On 26 March 1929, Charles Debbas secured re-election with 42 votes, granting him another three-year term. Lawsuits Lutfallah filed against politicians and journalists who had benefited from his largesse were all dismissed.

== Death and legacy ==
Prince George Lutfallah died in London on 20 June 1941. The Lebanese poet Khalil Gibran, who died in 1931, composed a 29-verse elegy written during Lutfallah's lifetime. Political scientist Farid El Khazen cites Lutfallah as an early example of wealthy Lebanese expatriates seeking political office, comparing his candidacy with the later political careers of Rafiq Hariri and Issam Fares.

== See also ==
- Emirate of Mount Lebanon – Former country
- Greater Lebanon – French mandate territory (1920–1943)

== Sources ==
- Bibliotheca Alexandrina (2025). "Zamalek". architecture.cultnat.org. Archived from the original on 29 September 2025.
- Dib, Boutros (2006). Histoire du Liban: des origines au XXe siècle (in French). Rey. ISBN 978-2-84876-073-5.
- Douek, Ellis (19 April 2012). A Middle Eastern Affair. Halban Publishers. ISBN 978-1-905559-36-7.
- Gellhorn, Eleanor Cowles (1965). McKay's Guide to the Middle East. McKay Company.
- Gibran, Gibran Khalil. "ما لجرح جرحته من ضماد" [Roughly: Unmended Wound]. Wikisource (in Arabic).
- Great Britain and the East (1929). "The Lebanese Presidency". Great Britain and the East. 35.
- Istituto per l'oriente (1929). Oriente moderno: rivista mensile d'informazione e di studi per la diffusione e la conoscenza dell'oriente, sopra tutto musulmano, pubblicata a cura dell'Instituto per l'oriente (in Italian). Istituto per l'oriente.
- Istituto per l'oriente (1941). Oriente moderno: rivista mensile d'informazioni e di studi per la diffusione e la conoscenza dell'Oriente, sopra tutto musulmano (in Italian). Istituto per l'oriente.
- Khazen, Farid El (10 December 2020). The Breakdown of the State in Lebanon, 1967-1976. Bloomsbury Publishing. ISBN 978-0-7556-0377-0.
- Khoury, Philip S. (2009). "ʿAbd al-Rahman Shahbandar". In Khalidi, Walida; Manṣūr, Kamīl; Fawaz, Leila Tarazi (eds.). Transformed Landscapes: Essays on Palestine and the Middle East in Honor of Walid Khalidi. American Univ in Cairo Press. ISBN 978-977-416-247-3.
- Khoury, Philip Shukry (14 July 2014). Syria and the French Mandate: The Politics of Arab Nationalism, 1920-1945. Princeton University Press. ISBN 978-1-4008-5839-2.
- Philipp, Thomas (1985). The Syrians in Egypt, 1725-1975. Steiner. ISBN 978-3-515-04031-0.
- Riachi, Iskandar (1953). قبل وبعد - تذكارات إسكندر رياشي [Before and After - the memoires of Iskandar Riachy] (PDF) (in Arabic) (1 ed.). Beirut: Dar al-Hayat. Archived from the original (PDF) on 1 December 2022.
- Saoud, Ghassan (23 May 2015). "نعمة افرام: فرنكلن لبنان يهوى الرئاسة لا السياسة!". Elnashra News (in Arabic). Archived from the original on 13 February 2016.
- Zamir, Meir (31 December 1997). Lebanon's Quest: The Road to Statehood, 1926-39. Bloomsbury Academic. ISBN 978-1-86064-107-7.
- Zamir, Meir (1 May 2025). The Formation of Modern Lebanon. Taylor & Francis. ISBN 978-1-040-34047-9.
- Zein ed-Din, Ahmad (30 August 2018). "من حكايا لبنان السياسية المنسية كيف فكر أحدهم ان يكون رئيسا.. فأميرا.. فملكا" [From Lebanon’s forgotten political tales: How one man dreamed of becoming President… then Prince… then King]. جريدة اللواء (in Arabic). Archived from the original on 25 September 2025.
- Zein ed-Din, Ahmad (20 August 2022). "حين كثُر الحديث عن إمارة وعرش في لبنان في عشرينيات القرن الماضي". Al Liwaa (in Arabic). Archived from the original on 1 December 2022.
