= Syrian Unity Party =

The Syrian Unity party was set up by Syrian emigres in Cairo at the end of 1918. Its founders included signatories to the memorandum that resulted in the Declaration to the Seven and persons previously connected with the Ottoman Party for Administrative Decentralization. In August 1921, the party organized the Syrian–Palestinian Congress in Geneva with a view to influencing the terms of the proposed League of Nations mandate over the region.

== Members and Platform ==
- Michel Lutfallah;
- Rashid Rida;
- Rafiq al-Azm;
- Haqqi al-Azm;
- Abd al-Rahman Shahbandar;
- Khaled al-Hakim;
- Sheikh Kamal al-Qassab;
- Salim Sarkis;
- Iskander 'Ammun;
- Muhibb al-Din al-Khatib;

The party platform stated:

1.Syria in its territorial integrity and in its national unity shall extend from the Taurus Mountains in the north, to the Khabur and Euphrates rivers in the east, to the Arabian Desert and Mada`in Salih in the south, and the Red Sea, Aqaba-Rafah line and the Mediterranean Sea in the west. 2.Syria shall enjoy absolute independence guaranteed by the League of Nations, which shall also guarantee its constitution without prejudicing its independence.

== Background ==
Before the war, Cairo was a center of activity for the developing Arab independence movement, its permissive atmosphere and community of Syrian emigres was a magnet for political exiles.

On 23 October 1918 following the Sinai and Palestine Campaign of World War I, the Occupied Enemy Territory Administration was established over Levantine provinces of the former Ottoman Empire. Earlier, on 1 October 1918, General Allenby had been authorized to permit the hoisting of the Arab flag at Damascus.

The political scene in Damascus was dominated by three organizations, al-Nadi al-'Arabi (the Arab Club with strong Palestinian connections), Hizbal-Istiqlal al-'Arabi (the Arab Independence Party connected to al-Fatat) and Al-'Ahd (an Iraqi-run officers association).

An Arab government was announced on 5 October 1918 and gained de facto independence after the withdrawal of the British forces on 26 November 1919. The Arab Kingdom of Syria was an unrecognized state proclaimed as a Kingdom on 8 March 1920 and existed until 25 July 1920. During its brief existence, the kingdom was led by Sharif Hussein bin Ali's son Faisal bin Hussein. Despite its claims to the territory of the region of Syria, Faisal's government controlled a limited area and was dependent on Britain which, along with France, generally opposed the idea of a Greater Syria and refused to recognize the kingdom. The kingdom surrendered to French forces on 25 July 1920.

== Bibliography ==
- Porath, Yehoshua (1974). The emergence of the Palestinian-Arab national movement, 1918-1929. Cass. ISBN 978-0-7146-2939-1.
- Khoury, Philip Shukry (14 July 2014). Syria and the French Mandate: The Politics of Arab Nationalism, 1920-1945. Princeton University Press. ISBN 978-1-4008-5839-2.
- Beshara, Adel (27 April 2012). The Origins of Syrian Nationhood: Histories, Pioneers and Identity. Taylor & Francis. ISBN 978-1-136-72450-3.
