= Shukri Ghanim =

Shukri Ghanim may refer to:

- Chekri Ganem (1861–1929), Lebanese intellectual, writer, playwright, poet, and journalist.
- Shukri Ghanem (1942–2012), Libyan politician .
