= Michel Lutfallah =

Arab nationalist politician

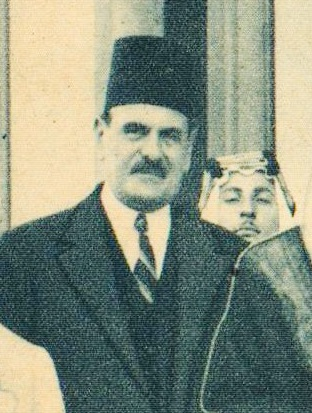
Michel Lutfallah at the Gezirah palace, Egypt (1920s)

Michel Lutfallah (Arabic: ميشال لطف الله) was a wealthy Lebanese-Egyptian socialite, Arab nationalist leader and businessman from Cairo, noted for his role in the Syrian independence movement under the French Mandate. Born into a wealthy Greek Orthodox Christian family of Lebanese origin, he became a leading figure among émigrés in Egypt. Lutfallah was a major financial supporter of Syrian nationalist organizations in Egypt. He served as President of the Syrian-Palestinian Congress, and allied with the Hashemites and British to press for Arab independence. His faction often opposed Islamist or Ottoman-oriented leaders.

== Early life and background ==
Michel Lutfallah was born in Cairo in 1880, the eldest son of Habib Pasha Lutfallah, a Lebanese Greek Orthodox Christian who had emigrated to Egypt and built a fortune in cotton plantations and banking. His father became an advisor to Sharif Husayn of Mecca, and King Husayn honored Habib Lutfallah with the title Emir (prince) for his support. Michel and his brothers inherited this title. Habib also associated himself with Khedive Ismail of Egypt. In 1919, he acquired the Gezirah Palace whom the indebted Khedive had built for Eugénie de Montijo, the Empress of the French, for her visit to inaugurate the Suez Canal in 1869, and made it his private residence, and hosted dignitaries, literary salons, and banquets. He grew up in Egypt among the Syrian/Levantine elite, receiving a Western-style education. Lutfallah later married the daughter of a wealthy Syrian Christian merchant in Alexandria.

== Political career ==
Lutfallah inherited substantial wealth and invested it in business ventures in Egypt and was among the richest members of the Levantine community in Egypt. In May 1916 he and other Syrian expatriates in Egypt petitioned the U.S. consul to protest the humanitarian crisis in Ottoman Lebanon and Syria. During the last years of Ottoman rule in the aftermath of World War I, Lutfallah aligned with the Hashemite movement and devoted himself to the Arab nationalist cause, helping raise funds and awareness in Cairo for Sharif Husayn’s Arab Revolt against Ottoman rule. In 1918, he co-founded the Party of Syrian Unity in Cairo composed of Arab exiles, to articulate demands for postwar self-rule. In August 1921, he was elected President of the Syrian-Palestinian Congress in Geneva, which lobbied the post-World War I powers to guarantee Syria’s unity and independence. He and his other brother, George were the congress' major financial backers. Under the French Mandate that began in 1920, Lutfallah continued to agitate from Egypt. In 1922, he told The New York Times that imposing a French mandate would enslave the Syrian people and betray the League of Nations. The Syrian-Palestinian Congress organized relief for nationalists and funneled funds to insurgents supporting Abdul Rahman Shahbandar’s anti-French People’s Party, which was active in the Great Syrian Revolt of 1925–1927. By the mid-1920s his faction’s influence waned; after King Husayn’s defeat, the younger nationalist leaders in Syria broke with the Hashemites and sought new strategies. In October 1927 Lutfallah was finally ousted as President of the Congress Executive in Cairo, as Syrian opposition politics shifted toward the secular National Bloc leadership.

== See also ==
- Chekri Ganem – Lebanese writer and journalist (1861–1929)
- George Lutfallah – Lebanese socialite and political aspirant
