= Nuh Ibrahim =

Palestinian folk poet, singer, and composer

- نوح ابراهيم
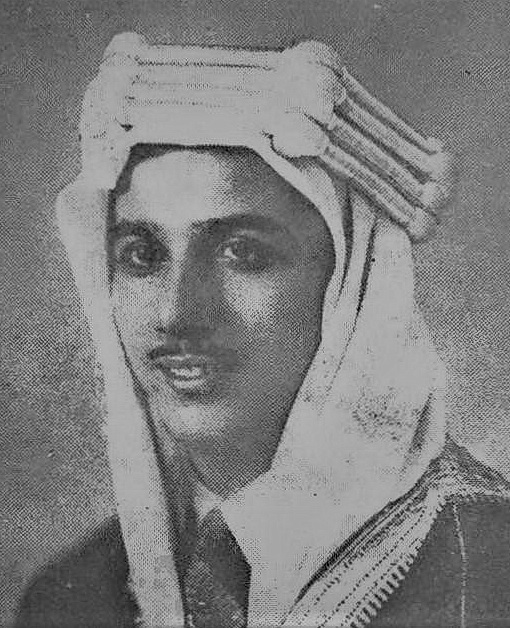
- Born: 1913; Haifa, Ottoman Empire
- Died: 28 October 1938 (aged 24–25); Al-Sanibah near Tamra, Palestine
- Cause of death: Britain military
- Years active: 1913-1938
- Title: Poet

Nuh Ibrahim (Arabic: نوح ابراهيم) (1913 - 28 October 1938), sometimes referred to as "the popular poet of the 1936 revolution" and "student of Qassam", was a Palestinian folk poet, a singer, a composer, and a fighter. He was born in Haifa in the Ottoman Empire. He started writing poetry at an early age.

Nuh Ibrahim expressed the conscience of his people in a smooth tone, with an easy, lyrical, understandable language, approaching ordinary speech, showing his love of the nation, calling for its defense, and urging people to revolt. His poetry represented the beginning of the golden age of Palestinian folk poetry, and he carried with his contemporaries among the popular poets such as: Farhan Salam, Abu Saeed Al-Hattini and Saud Al-Asadi the concern of Palestinian society, and its revolutionary resistance against the British occupation and the Zionist settlement during the 1936-1939 Arab revolt in Palestine.

Nuh Ibrahim composed a large number of popular songs and poems all around Palestinian and Arab national and political issues and events during that period. Until today people sing some of his songs.

== Biography ==
=== His family ===
Nuh was born in the Wadi Nisnas neighborhood in the city of Haifa in House No. 30. His father was Palestinian, he worked in the municipality of Haifa. His mother was from Cretan her name is Zaida. She was a captivity woman who was brought from the island of Crete to the port of Haifa in the Ottoman era. Sheikh Abd al-Salam Ahmad Abu al-Hija who was from the village of Ein Hod (Haifa district) gave her to a young relative named Hussein Abu al-Hija who lived in Haifa, so he married her. Then she gave birth to her first child, Mustafa, but her husband died shortly after his son's birth. Then Zaida married Nuh's father, who lived in the Wadi Nisnas neighborhood of Haifa and owned a house with two floors. She gave birth to (Nuh) and his sister (Badiaa). Then his father was martyred after 4 years of marriage when Nuh was young. His family lived in poverty after him, their only income was from the rent of the first floor of the house, which was rented to Hajj Muhammad Abd al-Qadir Abu al-Hija.

At a later stage, Badia, Nuh's sister, got married and gave birth to two daughters, while his mother, Zaida, emigrated to Beirut, Lebanon during the events of the Nakba in 1948, and died there in 1952.

=== Early life ===
As a result of his father's death in an early age and the lack of income, Nuh's family lived in poverty and need, so Nuh lived in an abbey under the care of the nun Root Sunbul for a few years. He used to visit his mother while she visited him sometimes too, until he returned home to live with his mother. At that time, Nuh joined the Islamic school that was later called the Independence School, which was the only school in Haifa at the time in 1929. The school was located in Wadi al-Salib area. Nuh studied in the school from the scholars and jihadists in the Islamic school, such as Sheikh Kamel Al-Qassab, the school director, Rashid Bey in Parson, the mathematician Darwish Al-Qassas (a graduate of the French Sorbonne Institute), the English language teacher Hani (an English BA from the American University), the Sheikh and the Mujahid Al-Imam Izz al-Din al-Qassam and Sheikh Reda. Then he dropped out of school and worked in one of the Haifa printing presses. After completing his sixth grade in the Islamic school, he was sent on a mission to the orphanage school in Jerusalem, where he learned book binding, building cardboard boxes, and printing.

=== Youth ===
After his graduation, Nuh began his warfare and labor life. He worked in the smoke company in the city of Haifa, and he used to teach the workers about jihad and how to battle in the company, until he succeeded in making them follow the group of Sheikh Izz al-Din al-Qassam. Later, Nuh decided to leave the smoke company to get advanced in the field of journalism and media. He traveled to Jaffa. He worked as an editor for many newspapers that were published there. He also participated in establishing the private commercial printing press in the city of Haifa.

Then, in 1934 Nuh moved to Iraq to work as a technical expert in one of the Baghdad printing presses. He was known to be the best technicians in Baghdad. During his work at this printing press, Mr. Rashid bin Sabah Al-Jalahmah, a resident of Bahrain, approached the director of the printing press in Baghdad and asked him to offer Nuh with an opportunity to work as a technical expert at the Bahrain printing press, which is preparing to publish the first Bahraini newspaper. The obsession with the creation of this Bahraini newspaper goes back to Abdullah Al-Zayed, a Bahraini pearl merchant whose work has been declining, so he thought of investing his intellectual and literary capabilities in bringing a printing press to Bahrain in the early 1930s. Therefore, he sent his friend Rashid Al-Jalahma to Baghdad for two reasons: The first is training in the printing business so he stayed for seven months to train in Baghdad printing presses. The second reason, was to bring a printing expert from Baghdad to train the Bahraini team that would work in the printing press, so Nuh Ibrahim was chosen one. Nuh was surprised by the offer and he asked for a chance to think, and after a week he agreed to the offer and traveled with Rashid Al-Jalahmah to the Pearl Country by a large sailboat coming from Basra to the port of Manama, wearing his white Arab dress that he always insisted on wearing.

After arriving at the printing press, Nuh knew that he was the only one who knew the operation of modern printing machines in the printing press. So he began to train Bahrainis on printing machines and how to work with them. During the first three months, Nuh was able to train many workers in Bahrain. There will be a full Bahraini team of typists and workers, such as: Abd al-Rahman al-Hasan, Abd al-Rahman Ashir, Muhammad al-Jowder, Ahmad Fleifel, Mustafa Buallai, Abdullah al-Mannai and others. Then he set up the work system in the printing press, and distributed the work among others. There was a typographer, Associate, Worker in the Binding Department, Worker in the Paper Department and Worker in the Lining Department. The workers loved him and they all wanted to host him in their homes.

Upon the success of the printing press and its progress, Nuh would remember his poems and rhymes. Despite the hard work in the printing press, his poetic spirit made him keen to attend all homes in Muharraq and Manama, he went to all the people who invited him because the attendees to hear his patriotic chants and chants about Palestine and the revolution against the British Mandate. the councils began competing for his presence for his distinctive songs and the cheerful spirit that he was known for. During this period Nuh also wrote poems and songs specific to Bahrain.

Nuh's life was comfortable in the Pearl Islands and he used to send letters to his friends and family in Baghdad and Haifa, describing his new work, comfortable life and picturesque country. At the night of the end of the first year of his work in Bahrain, the printing press began its commercial activities, to issue the first weekly newspaper in the Gulf by the owner of the printing press, Abdullah Al-Zayed.

But after the end of his first year of work, the news of the 1936 revolution began to reach Bahrain. Despite the stability of his life in the Pearl Islands and the renaissance of the printing press, Nuh decided to pack his belongings, join the revolutionaries and fight the British and the Jews in Palestine. He told his friend Rashid Al-Jalahmah, "Words are no longer useful with these executioners." All the requests of the owner of the printing press and its workers asking him to stay did not change his mind. He was waiting for the first ship carrying him to Basra, to return from there to Palestine after less than a year and a half he spent in Bahrain. His last request to the Bahrainis was: "If you do not go for jihad in Palestine, then help them with money". As for his return to Palestine and the life of jihad, the British forces deported him from northern Palestine for his participation in the struggle against the British mandate, so he stayed in the village of Ein Karem, where he was famous for staging plays in the village.

=== Struggle ===
During his work in Jaffa, Nuh joined Izz al-Din al-Qassam, and he used to accompany him on his trips to the villages of Haifa and Jenin. He was influenced by his teachings at the Al-Istiqlal Mosque in Haifa. In 1931, he and his companions founded a gang of scouts, whom Sheikh Izz al-Din al-Qassam called “the League of Muhammad al-Aba's Boys.” Nuh trained and educated this group, teaching the cubs to use weapons, and preserving their national anthems.

On his return from Bahrain, and a year after of al-Qassam's death, the "League of Muhammad the Father" participated in the revolution. It turned into a secret organization bearing the name "The Khaled Clan" organization, which collected donations and supplied the rebels with weapons. Nuh Ibrahim had an active and main role in the cooperation of the Qassam leaders to be under the command of one leader in the so-called jihadist group. The group adopted the armed struggle alongside the silent revolution, and three of them attacked a Jewish convoy near Anabta under the leadership of Sheikh Farhan Al-Saadi, the successor of the martyr Al-Qassam, who took revenge for him. The British authority then executed him while he was fasting in his eighties.

In February 1937, the British Mandate government placed Nuh Ibrahim in Mazraa Prison and then in Acre Prison, after the spread of his chant, "Plan it, Mr. Dill", where he addressed with sarcasm the General Dill when he was appointed by Britain as Commander-in-Chief of the British Army in Palestine to suppress the revolt. Nuh Ibrahim described in his diary how he entered prison:

"We were imprisoned in the second month of 1937, and we spent 5 months in Acre Prison and the Mazraa Detention Center. Our numbers were increasing until it reached two hundred detainees. They were all considered from the best men in the country, who were working and well-known scholars. The charges against us were fabricated and very bizarre, it suffices to prove one of them to push us to the gallows, according to the new laws."

However, it seems that Commander Dill was impressed with Nuh's personality, as he was brought from the prison to meet the British official, General Dill, and he was released after five months in prison.

Nuh continued to fight and grapple with colonialism and the Zionist movement on the one hand, and producing songs and chanting popular poems and songs on the other hand. Until these popular poems became a source of anger for the British colonialist, so they insisted on banning it. On February 22, 1938, the British Observer of Publications in Palestine, "Owne Meridette Tweedy," who was known for his exhaustion of Palestinian newspapers at the time, issued a decision prohibiting the publication or printing of his poems, and this is the text of resolution:

"Based on the authority vested in me as an observer of publications ... According to the emergency system, I (Owne Meridit Tweedy) prohibit printing or publishing the bulletin containing the collection of Nuh Ibrahim's poems printed outside Palestine known as the “Nuh Ibrahim Collection” in Palestine."

=== His death ===
Nuh was martyred when he was 25 years old after joining the revolution with his weapon, writings, and voice. While he was going to visit his relatives in the village of Majd al-Krum, accompanied by three of his comrades. They were on their way to the village of Tamra, where the British were fortifying the mountain. They noticed these horsemen, and kept an eye on their movement, and as they went up from a deep valley to the lands of Kabul to the village of Kaukab Abu Al-Hija, Galilee. The Englishmen set for them a trap near Khirbet Dumaida. In a woody place called Al-Sanibah near Tamra Nuh and his companions got off their horses to rest a little, but the Britain military force surprised them supported by squadrons of RAF aircraft. While they were about to leave, Nuh died with each of his three comrades: Muhammad Khader Qeblawi, Izz al-Din Khalayleh, and Abu Raad (among the Syrians who volunteered in the revolution). This incident took place on Friday the evening of the first day of Ramadan in 10/28/1938. The British threw their bodies in a well, then the people of Tamra came and carried the bodies of the martyrs and they buried them in Tamra, in an old cemetery in the town. A memorial was erected for them in the village in 1986.

The news of Nuh Ibrahim's death spread in the Arab countries, so the newspaper "Al-Shabab" in Cairo, owned by the Palestinian militant Muhammad Taher, reported the following news:

"Al-Quds, October 28, 1938, the Arab poet Nuh Ibrahim, one of the most prominent leaders of the revolution, was killed during the attack carried out by British forces on the outskirts of Haifa last Tuesday. His body was discovered yesterday near Tamra ... This is the painful news that we were surprising. It had a severe impact on our souls, because the martyrdom of this brilliant young man was a loss to the Arab national movement and the popular national jihad. The phonograph companies were racing to record his patriotic anthems, which he composed, and hundreds of thousands of them were printed. People in societies and homes listened to them and they feel the words with their souls and deep into their hearts."

== His most famous poems ==
Nuh issued his poems in a booklet, the first edition is still kept by very few families. He wrote on its inside cover “The collection of poems of Mujahid Palestine - composed by Nuh Ibrahim, the Palestinian folk poet and the student of the Qassam - Haifa - Palestine - contains poems, national and enthusiastic folk poems and records. The New Popularity Coming Soon - Copyright and composition are reserved and private”.

However, as previously mentioned, publication of this booklet was prohibited and it was prohibited to import it into Palestine from outside it. Therefore, there is no specific place that concentrates all its poems. The poems that have been preserved by the Palestinian people have emerged.

Nuh Ibrahim became famous for his poem of lamentation for the martyrs of the Al-Buraq Revolution in 1929. On June 17, 1930 on the occasion of the execution of three mujahideen Muhammad Jamjoom, Fuad Hijazi, and Atta al-Zir in Acre Prison in the city of Acre during the Al-Buraq Revolution, that day was later known as "Red Tuesday" for the championship of the three Martyrs in the Face of Death. Fouad Hijazi and Muhammad Jamjoom were graduates from the American University of Beirut, and Atta al-Zeer was a worker.

Some of his famous poems:

- Don't Panic Palestine

Mawal (which is Folk song in colloquial language) was about one of the popular leaders of the 1936 revolution, Abu Dura, who evolved from an ordinary revolutionary into a platoon commander. Until then he became one of the most powerful pimp in the northern region of the country. The poet Tawfiq Ziyad found this money during his excavation of the relics of the poet Nuh Ibrahim and published it in Al-Jadeed magazine Al-Hifawiyah. (Issues: 11 + 12 for 1970)

- Jaffa Marine

Nuh sang this poem to the brave sailors of Haifa and Jaffa after they announced the famous strike, following the discovery of the arms smuggling operation of the Zionist movement, which was at the beginning of a very wide political strike movement.

- May God give life to the detainees

In this poem, Nuh sings glorification for the youths of Palestine, leaders and revolutionaries, Muslims and Christians, exiles, detainees and martyrs.

- The homeland is for everyone

In this poem, Nuh Ibrahim calls for deepening the roots of national unity, singing for the homeland and the unity of its children.

- These Nurses are Angels of Mercy

Nuh Ibrahim entered the government hospital in Haifa. The famous hospital surgeon, Dr. Nayef Hamzah, operated on him. The nurses took special care of him, so he thanked them for their beauty through this poem.

- Long live the Arab woman

This poem revolves around a story that happened during the battle of Wad al-Tuffah. The poem tells the story of a widowed woman from Asira al-Shamaliya / North Nablus. She sold her gold and bought a rifle for her only son to participate in the fighting, but he returned home and she did not open the door for him. So he returned and fought until he was martyred.

== Medals and commemoration ==
- In 1990, the name of the martyr poet Nuh Ibrahim was awarded the Jerusalem Medal for Culture and Arts, from the Palestine Liberation Organization.
- A folklore award was established, bearing his name in 1983, issued under the name of the "Palestinian Encyclopedia of Folklore Committee", which was established in Al-Bireh in 1966. It was awarded a financial and appreciation awards to creators in the fields of folklore.
- Palestinian-born artist Hussein al-Mundhir (the leader of the Lovers Squad) embodied the character of Nuh Ibrahim in the Izz al-Din al-Qassam series in 1981.
- A street in the Yarmouk Camp in Damascus was named after him.

== Works about him ==
- A number of books have been published about him:
- Nimr Hijab, the martyr folk poet Nuh Ibrahim, 2005.
- Samih Shabib, the popular poet Nuh Ibrahim: the witness and the martyr, a study in a symposium entitled "Palestinian social history between the archive forest and the trees of stories", November 21–22, 2003 / Birzeit University.
- Abdul Aziz Abu Hadba, “The Poet Nuh Ibrahim, the history of the Palestinian Revolution", 1935–1938, Al-Zawia Magazine, Issue 3–4, Winter-Spring 2003.
- Khaled Awad, Nuh Ibrahim poet and martyr. Venus Press, Nazareth, 1990.
- Khaled Awad, Nuh Ibrahim, the popular poet of the revolution. 36-39
