= Khalil Mutran =

Lebanese poet and journalist

Khalil Mutran خليل مطران
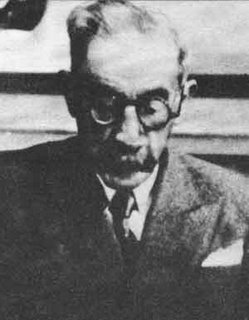
- Born: July 1, 1872; Baalbek, Ottoman Syria (modern day Lebanon)
- Died: June 1, 1949 (aged 76); Cairo, Kingdom of Egypt
- Occupations: Poet, Translator, Journalist
- Writing career
- Genres: Poetry, Translation
- Notable work: Diwan-al-Khalil
- Literary movement: Neo-romanticism, Apollo Society

Khalil Mutran (Arabic: خليل مُطران, ALA-LC: Khalīl Muṭrān; July 1, 1872 – June 1, 1949), also known by the sobriquet Shā‘ir al-Quṭrayn (Arabic: شاعر القطرين, lit. 'the poet of the two countries') was a Lebanese poet and journalist who lived most of his life in Egypt.

== Life ==
Khalil was born at Baalbek in Ottoman Syria to Abdu Yusuf Mutran and Malaka Sabbag from Haifa. Nakhlé Moutran, pasha of Baalbek, was his cousin. Khalil's mother Malaka descended from a large Palestinian family. Malaka's father was among the most respected persons in Haifa and her grandfather was an advisor of Ahmed al-Jazzar, pasha of Saint John d'Acre, who successfully resisted the siege of this town by the troops of Napoleon Bonaparte.

Khalil attended the Greek Catholic School in Beirut, where he was taught by Nasif al-Yaziji's sons, Khalil and Ibrahim. It was here he had formally studied his native Arabic as well as French. In 1890, he left Lebanon for France. Although he planned to immigrate to Chile, he actually settled in Egypt in 1892. Here, he found his first job at Al-Ahram. He also contributed to Al-Mu’yyad and Al-Liwa. In 1900, he founded his own fortnightly magazine, Al-Majalla al-misriyya (1900-2, 1909). He published some of his own works and also of Mahmud Sami al-Barudi in this magazine. In 1903, he started publishing a daily newspaper Al-Jawaib al-misriyya (1903-5), which supported Mustafa Kamil’s nationalist movement. He collaborated with Hafez Ibrahim in translating a French book on political economy. He translated a number of plays of Shakespeare, Corneille, Racine, Victor Hugo and Paul Bourget into Arabic. In 1912 he translated Shakespeare’s drama Othello into Arabic as Utayl, which is the most celebrated and best-known translation of the drama into Arabic. His translation was not based on the original, but on a French version of it by Georges Duval. Other dramas of Shakespeare translated into Arabic by him are Hamlet, Macbeth, The Merchant of Venice, The Tempest, Richard III, King Lear and Julius Caesar. He also translated Corneille’s Le Cid, Cinna and Polyeucte and Victor Hugo’s Hernani. He later took a post as secretary to the Agricultural Syndicate and helped to found Banque Misr in 1920. In 1924, he made a long journey through Syria and Palestine, after which he claimed himself as a poet of the Arab countries (Arabic: شاعر الأقطار العربية). After the death of Ahmed Shawqi in 1932, he chaired the Apollo literary group till his death. In 1935, he became director of the Al-Firqa al-Qawmiyya (National Company) of the Egyptian theatre. He died in Cairo in 1949.

== Works ==
An anthology of his poems, the Diwan-al-Khalil was published in four volumes during his lifetime, the first volume of which was published in 1908. In his poems, Hourani feels, “traditional forms and language were used not for their own sake but to give precise expression to a reality, whether in the external world or in the author’s feelings”. He was a pioneer of the Romantic poetry in the Middle East. In 1932, he co-wrote the Egyptian film The Song of the Heart, the first musical in Egyptian cinema.
