= Nakhlé Moutran =

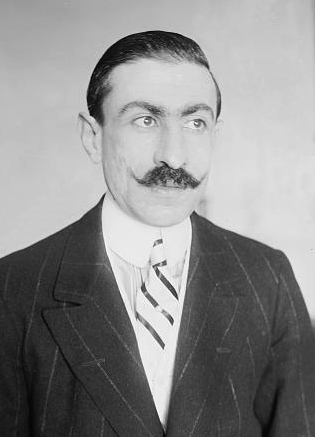
Nakhlé Moutran while in the United States.

Nakhlé Moutran (Arabic: نخلة مطران - 14 July 1872 - 1915) was the pasha of Baalbek (Lebanon) during the late Ottoman empire period. He was a Greek Melkite Catholic, and inherited his political office from his grandfather who is said to have been the first Christian to be given the title Pasha after the Tanzimat edict of 1856. He was close to France, which after the onset of World War I caused his arrest and trial where he was sentenced to perpetual prison with labour, but died on his way to his designated imprisonment location in Diyarbakr.

== Biography ==
=== Family background ===
Nakhlé was born on 14 July 1872, at Baalbek (which at that time belonged to the Ottoman Empire, and today is a city in the independent state of Lebanon) as son of Habîb Moutran (1829–1900), also pasha of Baalbek, and Marie Kateb. His grand father Yussef Moutran is said to have been the first Christian to receive the title of pasha from the hands of the sultan at Istanbul. Habib Moutran was decorated with a medal by the Ottoman's special envoy to Syria Fuad Pasha (1815–1869), an important reformer of the Tanzimat period, who was sent to Beirut in 1860 to enforce the Ottoman law after the outbreak of war, pretending to grant equal rights to all Ottoman citizens. After the massacres of the Druzes against the Christians in Syria, there also was formed, on September 6, 1864 (Dust. IV, pp. 695–735), a semi-autonomous region of Mount Lebanon under the government of a Mutasarrif to protect the local Christian population. But Mount Lebanon didn't include Baalbek and the Bekaa valley which were historically and commercially connected with Mount Lebanon. Included in Mount Lebanon was Zahlé and its territory, ruled by a Greek Catholic kaimakam (provincial governor).

Habîb and his father Yussef Moutran were allied to the Shiite Metawali family of the Harfoush. In fact, both, Yussef and Habîb Moutran, served them as secretaries and managed the financial affairs of this powerful family of emirs (princes). The Harfouch family enjoyed during centuries a sort of independence within and from the Ottoman Empire, relying on the large population of original Shiites in the region of Baalbek. The center of the cult of these Mutawelis and the Harfouch (which were held in much esteem among them) was at the entrance of the city of Baalbek, the tomb of Kholat, daughter of the famous Husayn ibn Ali, great granddaughter of Muhammad. There is no historical proof, but it is generally believed that after the defeat and the murder of Hossein at Karbala by the Umayyads, his family was taken captive to Damascus in Syria. Before reaching there, Kholat is said to have died in Baalbek, where she was also buried. The Ottoman sultans always tried to break the absolute power of the Harfouch family and the Shiites in that region, especially because the sultan was the spiritual leader of the Sunnites, arch enemies of the Shiites. With all of these efforts, the sultan only succeeded about 1850, when Sulayman Harfouch was captured by the Ottomans and taken to Damascus, where he is said to have been poisoned by his guards.

Yussef Moutran, his son Habîb and his grandson Nakhlé were from a traditional and very ancient Greek Catholic family which can trace its roots back to the very first Christians in that region. The Greek Catholics or Melkites represented the element of culture, tradition and excellent education, and they also had an Arabic background. For this reason, they succeeded to enter in the service of the Harfouch family. Baalbek, at that time was largely in the hands of the Shiite Mutawelis. Only a few Christian families, especially Greek Catholics, lived there. The center of the Greek Catholics was in the nearby town of Zahlé. But this was somewhat different in the seventeenth century, when the French Chevalier d'Arvieux saw it still prospering. At that time the ancestor of the Moutran family already lived at Baalbek, a certain bishop Epiphane of Baalbek (elected in 1628, died in 1647) who was married and left many descendants there.

It seems that the rise of the power of the Moutran family in Baalbek was connected with the end of the shiite influence and the Harfouch family there and that the sultan rewarded the cooperation of Habîb Moutran in this matter. Habîb Moutran, showing his recently gained power, lived in a palace-like mansion in Baalbek. This beautiful building still exists and was later transformed into a mosque. It was certainly there or at nearby Ras al-'Ayn, a very famous summer resort, where the Moutrans also had a house, that Nakhlé Moutran Pasha was born in 1872.

Considering his family background, he was born to enter into politics. His precursors were his brothers Yussef Moutran, born in Baalbek in 1852, Rachîd (1864-1935), born on 21 April 1864 in Baalbek and Nadra (1868-1917), born on 1 January 1868, also in Baalbek. Another brother Elias (1868-1921), who received later the title of Bey from the Ottoman Empire, married Evelyne Malhamé and became the father of Maud Moutran, better known under her husband's name as Maud Fargeallah (1909–1995).

Up to 1890, not much is known about the activities of Habîb's sons. They were still very young, but it seems that they entered into the protest movement against sultan Abdül Hamid II which swept at that time all the territory of the Ottoman Empire. When Abdul Hamid II became sultan of the Ottoman Empire in 1876, he promised and introduced a constitution, desisting from the absolute power which he held as secular and spiritual leader (caliph). But shortly afterwards, Abdül Hamid suspended the promised constitution and began to retaliate with severe measures against any form of resistance to his absolute government. In the Lebanon, many intellectuals and persons with much more insight in politics, also resented the suspension of the constitution, because they expected more independence for the Lebanon from a constitutional government. In 1889, the core of the resistance to sultan Abdül Hamid's despotism took the form of the Young Turks movement. Young means that they were a group of progressive intellectuals from many parts of the society, including, especially, students at the universities, but also officers from the Ottoman army and even members of the sultan's own family who were in opposition to his government.

Nadra Moutran, brother of Nakhlé, was a member of the Young Turks. He certainly became acquainted with this movement for constitutional government during his studies at the university of Saint Joseph in Beirut, between 1895 and 1899 and later in Constantinople (Istanbul). Nakhlé's sister Victoria also was a strong supporter of this movement.

More evident was the resistance of the Moutran family to the sultan's government in the person of Nakhlé's cousin Khalil Mutran, son of 'Abdû Youssef Moutran and Malaka Sabbag from Haifa.

=== Education ===
He received an excellent education and developed in early interest in literature which should determine the rest of his life as a famous poet and author.

=== Paris years ===
As he appeared critical to the sultan's government, he had to fear for his life and fled, in 1890, to Paris. Where he lived two years, frequenting the circles of the Young Turks, but became afraid another time, because Paris had many agents of the sultan who were trying to capture or assassinate the opponents. First, he decided to go to South America, where already parents of him had found refuge, but he finally opted for Egypt, where he began a brilliant career as an author and poet.

During the years between 1895 and 1900, Nakhlé certainly studied, like his brothers, who already lived in France and enjoyed there a great reputation among the Ottomans who lived there. It appears that he became during that time a friend of Rachîd, sultan Abdûl Hamid's brother. In this way, he entered into opposition to his brothers and his sister Victoria. However, between April 1906 and 1908 he lived in Paris in a mansion in the Avenue des Champs-Elysées, 71. He paid a rent of 9,000 francs per year which wasn't little at that time. His brother Nadra divided the rooms with him for some time. Since Nadra was allied with the Young Turks, this means that their different political attitudes didn't affect very much their personal relations.

It seems that Nakhlé was granted the title pasha during that time which he passed in France. Evidently, he made a living by selling paintings and antiquities. But the servants he entertained in his mansion told a quite different story: They were convinced that he was the head of the sultan's secret service in Paris. In any case, it was clear that he had the best relations with the embassy of the Ottoman Empire in Paris. Between the end of the year 1906 and the first months of 1907 he was confronted with serious financial difficulties and had recourse to different means to overcome them. He, especially, sent many messages to the sultan Abdûl-Hamid about certain intrigues against him. The French found at that time that he only invented these stories to enhance his reputation and gain some money. But as we know nowadays, only one year later, in the summer of 1908, the revolution of the Young Turks broke out, and the Ottoman troops from Salonica threatened to march on Istanbul.

Shortly before these events, in 1908, he went to Istanbul and, very certainly, met there with the sultan's brother Rachîd or the sultan Abdûl-Hamid himself. On the other hand, he returned several times to Paris and met with his brother Rachîd Moutran, obviously constructing political connections between certain groups of the Young Turks and the conservative groups around the sultan. During his financial difficulties, in the beginning of 1907, he also became the object of false accusations and calumny by the French actress Mme Carlier. Perhaps, this was part of a political intrigue against him, because he knew very much about the Young Turks movement.

=== United States ===
On 14 August 1908, Nakhlé Moutran Pasha, being on a visit to the United States, accepted an invitation of the Syrian daily newspaper Al-Hoda in New York that organized a meeting in honour of him as the leader of Young Turks at Paris for many years. The editor of Al-Hoda in the United States, Naoum Mokarzel, reminded the audience of the sufferings of the Young Turks revolutionaries and that the constitution had been established at a high price. The sultan was praised for having granted the constitution. In stark contrast to this declaration, the dinner celebrated the formation of a Syrian society under the presidency of Moutran Pasha. The Syrian financier Moutran Pasha, as the New York Times called him, was entertained with a dinner of the Syrian editors of New York at Kalil's restaurant, 14 Park Place, last night.

Moutran Pasha explained

that it was proposed not only to unite all Syrians, but all Arab people. Moutran Pasha was told of the reports from Washington that the retiring Turkish minister, the son of Izzet Pasha, whom the Armenians blame for the Armenian massacres, had been threatened with death. He said that no matter what the father had done, the son was not held responsible. The Young Turks would not stoop to the sending of death threats, he said.

=== Opposed constitution ===
It is told that Nadra Moutran, Nakhlé's brother, was very much friend with Izzet Pasha El-'Abed (born at Damascus in 1836), one of the leaders of the reactionary group in the Ottoman Empire, second secretary and chief advisor of sultan Abdûl-Hamid. Izzet Pasha also was responsible, as president, for the building of the famous Hijaz railroad from Turkey to Medina, depicted in the film “Lawrence of Arabia”. When Nadra Moutran was at Istanbul (Constantinople), he frequently paid visits to his friend Izzet Pasha. On the other hand, a German contemporary publication refers that Rachîd Moutran, Nadra's brother, originally much in favor of Abdûl-Hamid, was so much abhorred with the Armenian massacres that he separated his political ideas from those of the sultan. However, the Germans found that he only had been ousted from power by the Malhamés. Rachîd was very much contrary to constitutionalism in the Ottoman Empire, because he believed that this Western form of government didn't serve for the Ottoman Empire. He felt so much anger about the emerging victory of the constitution that he called Ahmed Riza (a prominent Young Turk and later Minister of Education) a mean idiot and the members of the Arab-Ottoman Brotherhood (Al-ikha) scoundrels.

The Moutran family had become acquainted with Ahmad Izzet Bey al-'Abid during the term of office of Kıbrıslı Mehmed Kamil Pasha (1833–1913), the sultan's grand vizier in Istanbul. Kamil Pasha held close relationships with Arab circles in Istanbul around Yussef Moutran, Nakhlé's brother, and Ahmed Izzet Bey al-'Abid (also a major shareholder in the Suez Canal Company in Egypt) who, at the time, were employed in the department of commerce in the Ottoman government.

Nakhlé Moutran Pasha remained for some time in the United States, residing at the Hotel Plaza. It seems that he had political meetings with the leaders of the 250,000 Syrians who lived in the United States. Many of them were citizens. Nakhlé told the editors of the Syrian papers to urge them to vote for William Howard Taft (1857–1930) who really was elected, in 1908, the 27th president of the United States.

=== Back in France ===
On the morning of October 1, 1908, Nakhlé sailed on the French liner La Provence for Paris. Before leaving, he gave an interview for the New York Times, explaining that he was a close friend of Rachîd Effendi, brother of the present sultan Abdûl-Hamid. If the former should be placed on the throne of Turkey in his brother's stead, he expected to have a high place in the new government.

Through an interpreter, he observed about the present conditions in the Ottoman Empire:

“The situation in Turkey is alarming. The Young Turks party is in power, but they are divided. There are two elements – the radicals and conservatives. I am certain there will be a renewal of the Macedonia revolts. The young Turks are losing their grip. They are verging on despotism and abusing their powers. They are riding roughshod over the Sultan, which is causing the enmity of the religious element.” (The New York Times, October 1, 1908).

He further explained that the German Ambassador helped the Sultan in negotiating the loan of the 4,000,000 livres recently obtained from the Deutsche Bank. He believed that the conservative faction will assert itself and that the next sultan will be Rachîd Effendi in place of his brother.

=== Manifesto ===
Nakhlé's brother Rachîd Moutran, speaking in the name of the Syrian Central Committee in Paris, published in December 1908 a manifesto which was also sent to many foreign embassies in Beirut. In this manifesto he claimed independence for Syria (including Lebanon) as a result of the constitutional development in the Ottoman Empire. He asserted that constitutional government in the Western sense wasn't possible in the Ottoman Empire and that it would inevitably lead to its dissolution because of the political aspirations of the minorities. The German orientalist Martin Hartmann was outraged at this manifesto. He argued that the Committee didn't represent all Syrians in the Ottoman Empire and in foreign countries, as they claimed. Moreover, he accused the representatives of the Syrian interests to use the introduction of a constitution only as a pretext to gain advantages and independence for Syria. The government of the German emperor was strongly opposed to a division of the Ottoman Empire, because, being allies of the sultan, they were afraid of a growing influence of the English and the French in that region.

The manifesto wasn't very well received by the population in Syria and Lebanon. One of the first to reprehend him, was Beirut's Christian deputy Sulayman al-Bustani. According to the governor in Damascus, the circular or manifesto caused widespread anger and sadness in Syria. Muhammad Arslan, deputy from Latakia, even pleaded to extend the condemnation to the entire Moutran family, although many members of his own family had been among the first to condemn him. Even Nakhlé's brother Nadra Moutran, one of the founders of Al-ikha, the Arab-Ottoman Brotherhood, in Istanbul, harshly criticized his brothers Rachîd and Nakhlé who professed to be the leaders of the Syrian Central Committee in Paris. On the other hand, many Syrians were afraid of French designs on Syria. They therefore strongly declared their support for the Ottoman state and condemned the circular.

Nadra Moutran also thwarted the political activities of his two brothers in another way, publishing at the time of the manifesto a book about the Young Turks, expounding his ideas of this political movement and its future (Reflexions d'un vieux Jeune-Turc, 1908).

=== Counter-revolution ===
Shortly after the deposition of sultan Abdûl-Hamid in 1908 and the renewal of the constitution, where the sultan justified the suspension as having been only temporarily “until the education of the people had been brought to a sufficiently high level by the extension of instruction throughout the empire”, there occurred a counter-revolution of reactionary elements. As it was generally felt that he was behind this coup, he finally lost his power completely and was in April 1909 substituted by his brother Rachîd Effendi who was proclaimed as Sultan Mehmed V.

Now, everything happened as Nakhlé Moutran Pasha expected, and he should have been content with his friend Rachîd in power. But it happened that Mehmed V (or Rachîd) had no real power and that the political decisions were taken by various members of the government. However, he gained, up to 1911, the position of a secretary at the Ottoman Embassy in Paris.

The era which now began, wasn't, unfortunately, that happy for the Moutran family, nor for the Lebanon which the members of this ancient Christian family loved very much. The Young Turks were, as already Nakhlé observed, split into at least two factions. As long, as they were not in power, these internal tensions were checked, but they broke out, as soon as they gained power.

There also was the question of the future of the Ottoman Empire in general, very much linked to Lebanon's future. As long as the government believed in a survival of the Ottoman Empire, they had to subdue every form of resistance to central government. But there already formed groups who preached Turkish nationalism as a counterpart to Arab nationalism, which meant a division and end of the ancient Ottoman Empire.

=== Cemal Pasha ===
Shortly afterwards, in 1911, there resided in Beirut for some days, at the hotel Chahine, ancient residence of Mme Bustros, an official of the Turkish government whose activities should turn out to be fatal and tragical for the life of Nakhlé Moutran Pasha and also for the Lebanon and Syria. It was Cemal Pasha (1872–1922), a high-ranking Turkish officer, who in the beginning collaborated with the Young Turks movement, but had lost, at that time the confidence of the new government. He was on his way to Baghdad, where he was destined to be governor (vali). He didn't relish very much the menu of the hotel and preferred, during the days he stayed there, to eat in the house of Nicolas de Bustros, a dandy very well known in Beirut. Bustros described Djamal (Cemal) Pasha as a charming man, very calm and agreeable. One day, he appeared in the house of Bustros accompanied by Victoria Moutran, Nakhlé's sister. Nobody imagined at that time that this charming Djamal one day should be called the butcher of Syria.

The Bustros family of Beirut was allied with the Moutrans by way of Nadra Moutran's wife Catherine Habib Bustros. Victoria (1882 – 8 August 1916, Paris) meddled very much with politics. She lived between Istanbul and Paris and used to receive in her salon politicians, dignitaries, intellectuals and businessmen. Nadra Moutran had with Catherine Bustros a son Habib who later became MP of Baalbek and Minister of Public Health in the Lebanon under the government of Rashid Karami (1921–1987).

=== Baalbeck ===
Meanwhile, Nakhlé Moutran Pasha retired to Baalbeck. There he encountered a growing unrest and discontent with the political situation which continued to cut off this region from the Mount Lebanon, formed by an Organic Statute of the sultan in 1864. All important decisions for Baalbek and the Bekaa valley were taken by the vali (Ottoman governor) at Damascus. So, Nakhlé, in the end of the year 1912, used the time to pay a visit to Damascus to secure the revision of a trial of one of his friends. There he also made two visits to the French Consul General Ottavi at Damascus who on January 15, 1913, reported about Nakhlé to Maurice Bompard, French ambassador in Constantinople. Nakhlé said in his conversation with Ottavi that he had to talk with him about a matter which should interest the natural protector of the Lebanon and Syria, i. e. France. He also added that the leading statesman of France had expressed himself to the same effect. He continued: “The present situation is intolerable. We have decided to secure the incorporation of Baalbeck and the plain of Bekaa in the Lebanon, with which they are united geographically. We need the help and protection of the French government. Muslims and Christians alike, we are all determined to succeed. We know, how we can achieve our object if the Ottoman government opposes an armed resistance. One section of the people of Baalbek belongs to our party and the town enjoys a special position. It's the key to the heart of Syria and the roads into the interior. The Chief of the Mutawelis (Essad Bey Haydar), the most influential man in the district, Abdul Gani el Rufai, the leader of the Muslims, and I are determined that our region shall form part of the Lebanon, and we have decided to go to Beirut to inform Monsieur Conget of our plans. He has always taken the greatest interest in everything connected with the Lebanon. But as Baalbek is in the area of your consulate, it is my duty to inform you of these matters on behalf of Essad Bey, Abdul Gani, and myself.”

Ottavi received these assurances with every courtesy, but also with the greatest reserve. He didn't trust Nakhlé very much, because he had been two years ago a secretary of the Turkish embassy in Paris, knew many of the French diplomatists, but was at the same time involved with the Unionist Party (the Young Turk movement). But his connections with the Unionists he denied, talking about the collapse of the Committee's policy and the insolence of the Young Turks.

In a note on the paper with the report, an anonymous person observed that Nakhlé Moutran Pasha had served Sultan Abdûl-Hamid and his advisor Izzet Pasha Al-'Abed. He concluded that the proposals of such a man should be handled with care. Similarly, an advice about the growing threat of war, given by Victoria Moutran to the British Prime Minister, was disregarded. Victoria recommended to keep the British fleet in the Bosphorus waters to prevent the Turks from allying themselves with the Germans against the allies.

Djamal Pasha, who had by now become one of the leading figures in the Ottoman government, had at the outbreak of World War I in 1914 a doubtful attitude with respect to European affairs. He was, personally, very much in favor of an alliance of the Ottoman Empire with France, but had to give up this idea because of the resistance of the two other pashas which formed the government, Enver and Talat. They favored an alliance with the German Emperor Wilhelm II (1859–1941), and Djamal sided with them when they took power in 1913.

=== Syria and Lebanon ===
In 1915, Enver Pasha sent Djamal Pasha to Syria and Lebanon and gave him nearly absolute power in military and civilian affairs over this part of the Ottoman Empire. In May of the same year, a law was passed which granted him emergency powers. Since the Ottoman Empire was at war with the British, the Russians and the French every attempt to gain independence or even to change the existing administration, was treated as treason. On the other hand, especially the British tried to foment and encourage movements for independence in all of the Arab territories of the Ottomans.

In this situation, Djamal Pasha being afraid of a general rebellion, had recourse to very severe measures against the population of Syria and the Lebanon. Many people, Christians alike Muslims, were arrested and executed. This persecution culminated in May 1916, when many persons were hanged in Beirut and Damascus.

In the same year, being afraid of a revolt led by the French, Djamal gave order to occupy the French consulates in Beirut and Damascus and to confiscate the secret French archives. There he encountered, among other things, the report which Ottavi had sent about Nakhlé Moutran Pasha to the French ambassador. Nakhlé, together with other members of his family, was arrested and sent to Damascus. Djemal Pasha commented later in his Memories:

Shortly before my arrival in Syria several important documents, implicating Nahle Mutran Pasha of Baalbek, were handed over to a court martial. As the inquiry was already in progress, it was necessary to let justice take its course. The court martial condemned Nahle Mutran Pasha to penal servitude for life.

After my visit to Jerusalem Hulussi Bey told me that the presence of Nahle Pasha in Damascus was open to objection, and he had obtained permission from Constantinople to send him under guard to Diarbekir. During the journey the Pasha had attempted to escape one night when they were near Djerablus, and had been found dead by his guards.

== Death ==
According to the memoirs of Djemal Pasha (Memories of a Turkish Statesman) Nakhlé was already arrested and on trial in Damascus before his arrival in Syria as commander of the Fourth army. He was sentenced by the martial court to penal servitude for life, and was sent to Diyarbakır by the Governor of Damascus, Mehmet Hulusi Bey. However, on his way there, Nakhlé attempted to escape near the city of Jarablus and was found dead by the guards.

Djemal Pasha also arrested Elias Bey, brother of Nakhlé, and sent him to prison in Damascus. They were both accused of sympathizing with the Allies and especially the French. Elias Bey Moutran was held four months in detention, while his brother Nakhlé was killed. Two years later, Elias Bey and his family were exiled to Changorie in Turkey. They only returned upon the withdrawal of the Ottomans from Lebanon and the arrival of the British to Zahlé.
