= Privat-Antoine Aubouard =

Acting President of Lebanon in 1934

- أنطوان بريفا أوبوار

President of the Lebanese Republic (acting)
- In office 2 January 1934 – 30 January 1934
- Preceded by: Charles Debbas
- Succeeded by: Habib Pacha Saad

Personal details
- Born: August 14, 1874 Moulins, Allier, France
- Died: October 9, 1934 (aged 60) Beirut, French Lebanon
- Occupation: Politician

Privat-Antoine Aubouard (French pronunciation: [pʁiva ɑ̃twan obwaʁ]; Arabic: أنطوان بريفا أوبوار; 14 August 1874 – 9 October 1934) was a Lebanese politician and a member of the French High Commission who became acting President of Lebanon for one month, from 2 to 30 January 1934 for the interim period in transfer of presidency from Charles Debbas, the first president of the Lebanese Republic under the French Mandate 1926 to 1934 and president Habib Pacha Es-Saad, the second president for 1934 to 1936.

== See also ==
- List of presidents of Lebanon

Preceded by Charles Debbas	President of Lebanon (acting); January 2, 1934 – January 30, 1934	Succeeded by Habib Pacha Saad
