= Syrian–Palestinian Congress =

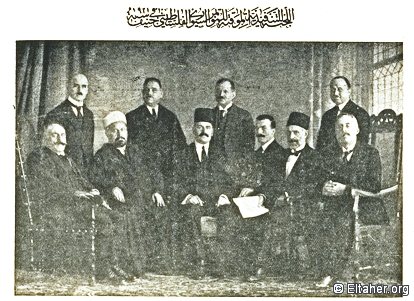
Syro-Palestinian Interim Conference in Geneva, 1921

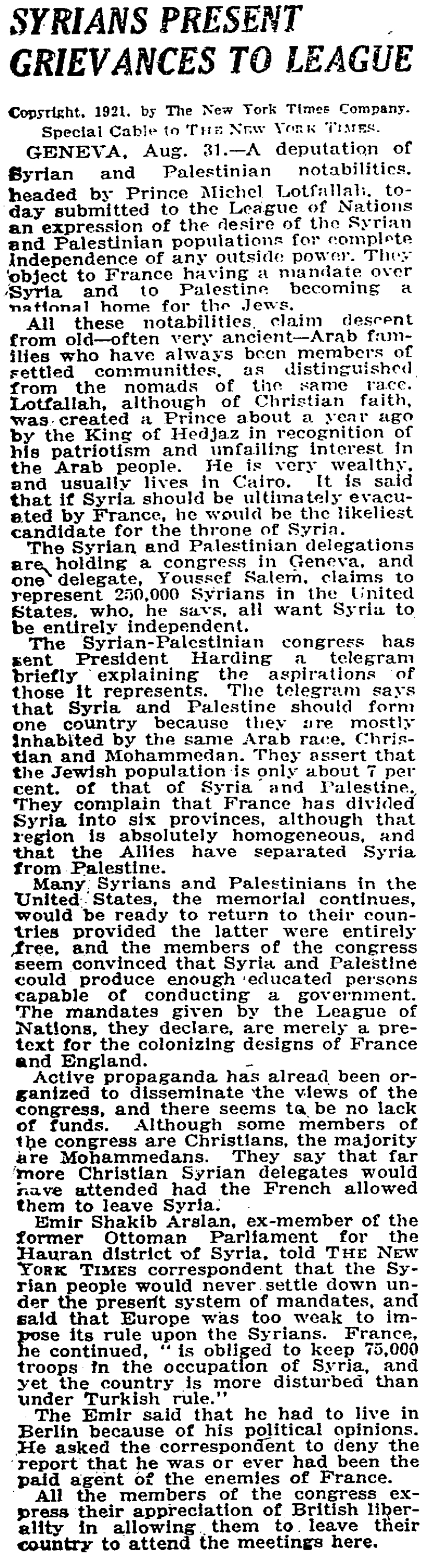
31 August 1921 New York Times article describing the work of the "deputation of Syrian and Palestinian notables"

The Syrian–Palestinian Congress, also known as the Syria-Palestine Congress or the Syro-Palestinian Congress, was an organisation founded on 25 August 1921 in Geneva by a group of Syrian and Palestinian exiles under the auspices of the Syrian Unity Party. The main aim of the congress was to try to influence the terms of the proposed League of Nations mandate over the region. It was one of a number of congresses held by Arab nationalists following the Arab Congress of 1913.

The formation of the congress followed the July 1919 "Pan-Syrian" Syrian National Congress. The addition of Palestine to the name followed the Franco-British boundary agreement of December 1920 which formally defined the territory of Palestine out of the region viewed by the Pan-Syrian nationalists as Greater Syria.

On 21 September, after twenty-six days of discussion, the joint congress issued a public statement to the League of Nations demanding:

1) Recognition of the independence and national rule (al-Sultan al-Qawmi) of Syria, Lebanon and Palestine

2) Recognition of the right of these countries to unite in the framework of a civilian government, responsible to a parliament elected by the people, and in association with the other Arab lands;

3) Immediate annulment of the Mandate;

4) The departure of the French and British forces from Syria, Lebanon and Palestine;

5) The annulment of the Balfour Declaration.

== Participants ==
- Michel Lutfallah (President)
- Rashid Rida (Vice President)
- +Haj Toufic Hammad (Vice President)
- Emir Shakib Arslan (Secretary General)
- Toufic El-Yazigi (Assistant Secretary General)
- Wahba El-Issa
- Riad El-Solh
- Salah Ezzeddine
- +Shibli El-Jamal
- Ihsan El-Jabri
- George Youssef Salem
- Taan Al-Imad
- +Amin Bey Al-Tamimi
- Najib Choucair
- Toufic Fayed
- Suleiman Kanaan
- Shukri al-Quwatli
- Abd al-Rahman Shahbandar

+ These three delegates traveled to Geneva from London, where they were part of a delegation authorized by the Fourth congress of the Palestine Arab Congress.

== External references ==
- The Ideas of Amir Shakib Arslan: Before and After the Collapse of the Ottoman Empire, Mahmoud Haddad
- Arabic translation of the September 1921 "Call to the Second General Assembly of the League of Nations" addressed by the Syrian-Palestinian Congress
- Photograph of the Syro-Palestinian Congress meeting in Geneva from August 25 to September 21, 1921
- Congrès Syrio-Palestinien: (Genève 25 août - 21 sept. 1921): Appel adressé à la 2me Assemblée générale de la Société des Nations
- Syrians Present Grievances to the League, New York Times, August 31 1922
- List of signatories

== Bibliography ==
- Khoury, Philip Shukry (2014). Syria and the French Mandate: The Politics of Arab Nationalism, 1920-1945. Princeton University Press. ISBN 978-1-4008-5839-2.
- Khoury, Philip Shukry (1981). "Factionalism Among Syrian Nationalists During the French Mandate". International Journal of Middle East Studies. 13 (4): 441–469. doi:10.1017/S0020743800055859. ISSN 0020-7438.
- Porath, Yehoshua (1974). The Emergence of the Palestinian-Arab National Movement, 1918-1929. Cass. ISBN 978-0-7146-2939-1.
