= Arab Congress of 1913 =

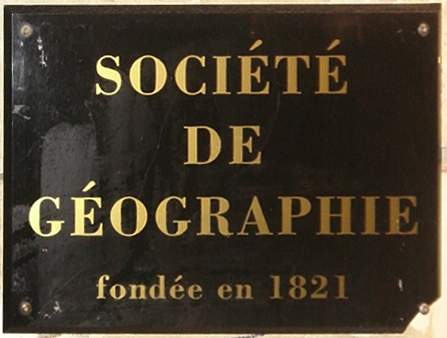
- Société de Géographie

Type
- Type: Unicameral

History
- Established: June 18, 1913
- Disbanded: June 23, 1913

Meeting place
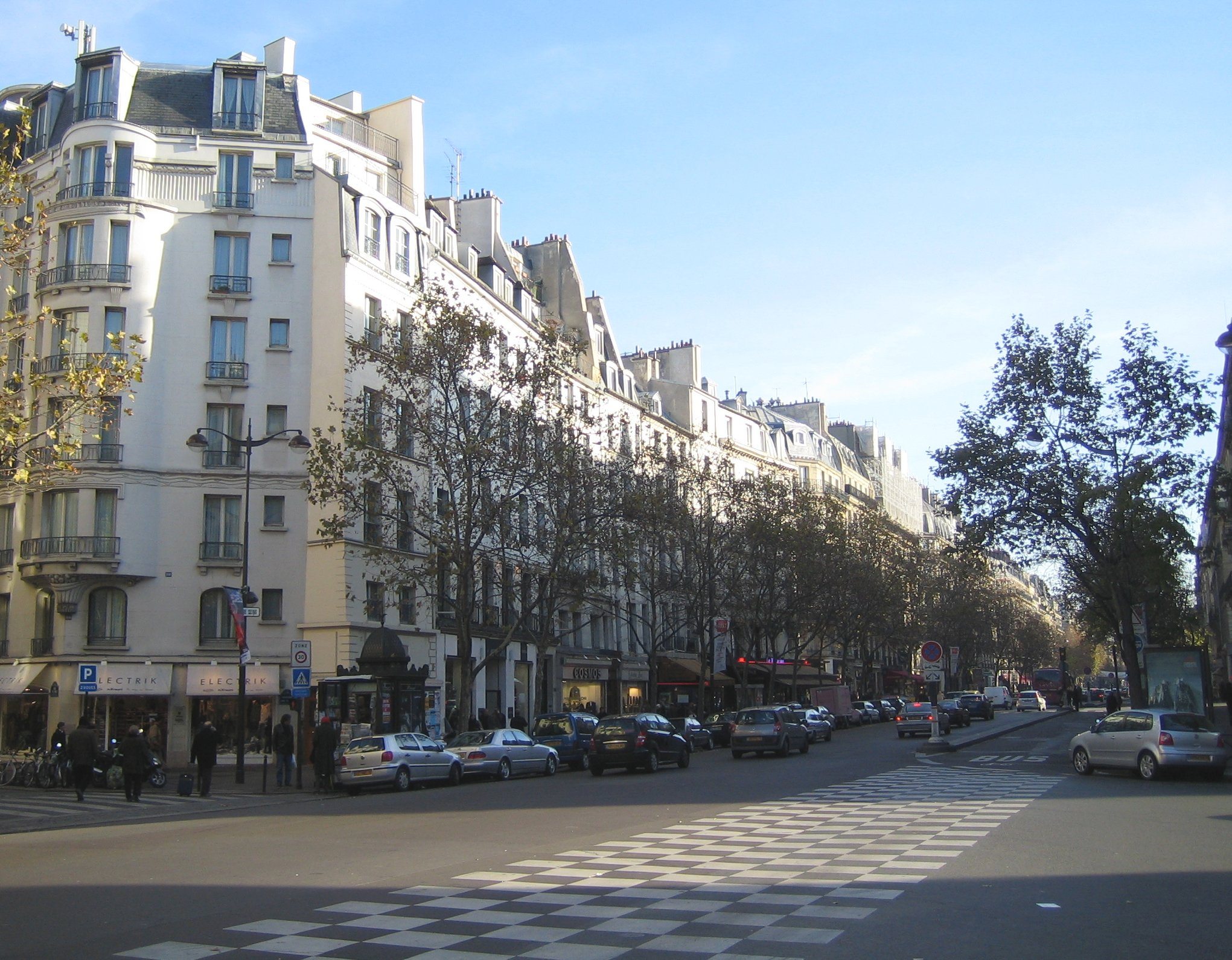
- Paris, France, Boulevard Saint-Germain at the corner of Rue de Buci. Buildings shown between the corner of the rue de Buci and rue de Seine are the original North side of the former rue des Boucheries.

The Arab Congress of 1913 (also known as the "Arab National Congress," the "First Palestinian Conference," the "First Arab Congress," and the "Arab-Syrian Congress") met in a hall of the French Geographical Society (Société de Géographie) at 184 Boulevard Saint-Germain, Paris from June 18–23 in Paris to discuss more autonomy for the Arab people living under the Ottoman Empire. Furthermore The Arab National Congress, which was established by 25 official Arab Nationalists delegates, was convened to discuss desired reforms and to express their discontent with some Ottoman policies. It took place at a time of uncertainty and change in the Ottoman Empire: in the years leading up to World War I, the Empire had undergone a revolution (1908) and a coup (1913) by the Young Turks, and had been defeated in two wars against Italy and the Balkan states. The Arabs were agitating for more rights under the fading empire and early glimmers of Arab nationalism were emerging. A number of dissenting and reform-oriented groups formed in the region of Syria, Palestine, Constantinople, and Egypt. Under Zionist influence, Jewish immigration to Palestine was increasing, and England and France were expressing interest in the region, competing for spheres of influence.

It was under these conditions that a group of students living in Paris called for a Congress to be held to discuss proposed Arab reforms. According to Najib Azouri, the real organizers of the congress were Chekri Ganem and the Moutran brothers, the rest were moutons de Panurge. While the Congress was not ultimately successful in its proposed aims, it was a reflection of events taking place and dynamics that shaped the early 20th century for three continents before World War I began. Many scholars place the origins of Arab nationalism during these crucial years that witnessed a dwindling of empires and a build-up of tension surrounding Zionist immigration to Palestine and Arab reaction to it. The whole Congress declared itself ready to struggle to bring the Arab Nation into being by means of revolution. Al-Hoda Editor and Lebanese League of Progress President, Naoum Mokarzel started cautiously by saying that: “The Revolution must be literary and reformist”, he continued more aggressively “only the last resort should it be bloody, because the political systems of free nations have been constructed by martyrs and not with printers ink.”

== Ottoman Empire ==
The Ottoman Empire was in a state of decline at the beginning of the 20th century. In 1908, a revolt led by the Young Turks led to regime change that briefly led to increased freedom of expression until the Turkish crackdown of 1915-1916. Attempts by the regime to contain Western influence, implement an increasingly centralized government, and movement toward the "Turkification" of Arab lands prompted resistance from parts of the Arab world. War broke out in the Balkans in October 1912, further weakening Istanbul's hold over its domain.

== Arab nationalism ==
Scholars disagree over when exactly Arab nationalism began, but there were glimmers of a distinctive Arab identity beginning to form, partly in response to perceived Ottoman oppression, in the years leading up to the Arab Congress. Particular concerns included the desire to speak Arabic in the public sphere, a decentralized administration (i.e. more local control over administrative matters), and the right for Arab soldiers to serve in their own region, rather than a distant corner of the empire.

=== Reform organisations ===
A number of reform-minded groups sprung up in these early years before World War I. Many remained secret so as to avoid government infiltration.

- Beirut Reform Society, "Jam'iyyat Beirut al-'Islahiyya," (Beirut, 1912)
  - sent a delegation of six to the conference
  - members: Salim Ali Salam, Ahmad Bayhum, among others
  - wanted French government to pressure the Unionist government to grant desired reforms
- The Young Arab Society, "al-Fatat," (Paris, 1911)
  - called for the Arab congress in order to "demonstrate the unity and strength of the Arab movement" as well as to discuss reforms (Thomas)
  - members: Abd al-Ghani al-Uraysi, Jamil Mardam Bey, and Awni Abd al-Hadi, Palestinian Rafiq al-Tamimi, the Iraqi Tawfiq al-Suwaidi, Ahmad Rustum Haydat, and Ahmad Qadri, among others
- Arab League Society, "Jam'iyyat al-Jami'a al-'Arabiyya," (Cairo, 1910)
  - Rashid Rida, founder
  - secret reform society whose goal was "to promote and safeguard Arab rights."
- Ottoman Party for Administrative Decentralization, or "Hizb al-Lamarkaziyyah al-Idariyyah al-Uthmani" (Cairo, 1912)
  - Founded by Rafiq al-Azm and Haqqi al-Azm.
- Al-Ahd, "The Covenant Society" (1914)
  - 'Aziz 'Ali al-Misri, founder and Ottoman Arab officer
  - largely consisted of army officers, including Yasin and Taha al-Hashimi, Salim al-Jaza'iri, Ali al-Nashashibi, Salim al-Tabbakh, Mustafa Wasfi, Isma'il al-Saffar, and Nuri al-Said, among others.
  - supported a "call for Arab independence...respect for Islamic values...and the institution of the Caliphate."
- Ligue de la Patrie Arabe, "League of Arab Patriots," (1904, Paris)
  - founded by Najib Azuri
  - goal was to free greater Syria and Iraq from Turkish domination
- Committee of Union and Progress (CUP)
- Literary Society, "al-Muntada al-Adabi," (Istanbul)
  - presidented by 'Abd al-Karim al-Khalil
  - as many as 1000 members
  - composed of Arab expatriate in Istanbul
  - al-Khalil was executed for treason in 1915

== Background ==
Jewish immigrants had begun arriving in historic Palestine before 1900. England and France were showing interest in the region as the two empires competed with one another for influence. Scholar David Thomas contends that many of the reform groups that participated in the conference "...were more suspicious of the intentions of Britain and France in the Levant than afraid of and hostile to the Ottoman Porte..." The Congress was held under the auspices of the French Ministry of Foreign Affairs.

== Congress timeline ==
- April 4, 1913: al-Fatat invites the Ottoman Party for Administrative Decentralization and the Muslim Friends Club to send delegates to the Congress.
- April 11, 1913: Ottoman Party for Administrative Decentralization accepts invitation.
- May 30, 1913: Delegates from several groups begin to arrive in Paris.
- June 18, 1913: Congress begins.
- June 23, 1913: Congress ends.

== Attendees ==
While there were 25 "official" delegates, many representatives of reform societies attended unofficially. The following is a partial list of both official and unofficial individuals:

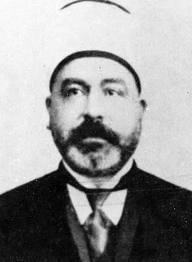
Abd al-Hamid al-Zahrawi

Izzat Darwaza

- Abd al-Hamid al-Zahrawi (president of Congress and later executed by the Turks )
- Salim Ali Salam, Muslim member of Beirut delegation and Executive Committee member of Congress
- Shaykh Ahmed Hassan Tabbara, Muslim member of Beirut delegation and Executive Committee member of Congress
- Ahmad Mukhtar Beyhum, Muslim member of Beirut delegation
- Albert Sursuq, Christian member of Beirut delegation
- Ayyub Thabit, Christian member of Beirut delegation
- Chekri Ganem, vice-president of the Congress, member of preparatory committee.
- Daud Barakat
- George Samné, a Syrian Christian
- Iskandar Bey 'Ammun, a Lebanese Christian
- Izzat Darwaza, representative from the Jamma'in subdistrict of Nablus
- Khalil Zaiyniyya, Christian member of Beirut delegation
- Khayrallah Khayrallah, a Syrian supporter of France
- Mahbub al-Shartuni (unofficial)
- Nadrah Matran (also transliterated as "Nadra Mutran"), a Lebanese Christian
- Najeeb Diab, President, United Syrian Society (New York)
- Najib Azouri, Maronite Arab Nationalist working for the cession from the Ottoman Empire.
- Naoum Mokarzel
- Rizq Allah Arqash (from Beirut Reform Society)
- Abd al-Karim al-Khalil (official delegate but did not attend sessions)
- Abd al-Ghani al-Uraysi, member of Preparatory Committee
- Dr. Sa'id Kamil, an Egyptian observer
- Sami Hochberg, Zionist and unofficial observer
- Tawfiq al-Suwaidi, an Iraqi member of al-Fatat
- Victor Jacobson, Zionist representative

== Resolutions ==
The Congress resolutions were detailed in ten points; these included: to ensure for the Ottoman Arabs the exercise of their political rights by making their participation in the central administration of the Empire effective, making Arabic "the official language in the Arab and Syrian provinces, the deployment of Syrian and Arab troops in their home provinces, except in time of "extreme necessity", the institution of decentralized regime in each of the Syrian and Arab vilayets, the extension of the administrative powers of the general council of the vilayet of Beirut, the improvement of the financial situation of Lebanon, The resolutions were communicated to the Quai d'Orsay, and to the Imperial Ottoman government. The Congress included a declaration of solidarity with the reformist demands of the Armenians.

== Aftermath ==
The Congress did not have a lasting effect, due in no small part to the beginning of World War I. Many of the concerns addressed at the Congress were decided as parts of larger shifts of power during the War. It is impossible to say what directions these proposed reforms would have taken were it not for the war, the fall of the Ottoman Empire and the Balfour Declaration. It is clear, however, that not only did Arabs not gain the freedoms they sought from the Ottomans, but with increased Zionist immigration, the Arab Revolt of 1936-37, and the founding of Israel in 1948, that rather the opposite came to pass. The Arab nationalism that came about after World War II is attributable to factors such as the decline of colonial influence, rather than reforms debated back in 1913.

== Bibliography ==
- Antonius, George. 2001. The Arab Awakening. Scafety Harbor, FL: Simon Publications.
- Ayyad, Abdelaziz A. 1999. Arab Nationalism and the Palestinians, 1850-1939. Jerusalem: Passia.
- Kayali, Hasan. 1997. Arabs and Young Turks, Ottomanism, Arabism, and Islamism in the Ottoman Empire, 1908-1918. Berkeley: University of California Press.
- Khalidi, Rashid. 1980. British Policy towards Syria and Palestine 1906-1914, a study of the antecedents of the Hussein-McMahon Correspondence, the Sykes-Picot Agreement, and the Balfour Declaration. London: Ithaca Press.
- Khalidi, Rashid. Palestinian Identity: The Construction of Modern National Consciousness. Columbia University Press, NY, 2010.
- Mandel, Neville. 1965. Attempts at an Arab-Zionist Entente: 1913-1914. Middle Eastern Studies 1 (3):238-267.
- Mandel, Neville. 1976. The Arabs and Zionism Before World War I. Berkeley: University of California Press.
- Marcus, Amy Dockser. 2007. Jerusalem 1913: The Origins of the Arab-Israeli Conflict. New York: Viking.
- Matthews, Weldon C. 2006. Confronting an Empire, Constructing a Nation: Arab Nationalists and Popular Politics in Mandate Palestine. London: I.B. Tauris.
- Nafi, Basheer M. 1998. Arabism, Islamism, and the Palestine Question 1908-1941, a Political History. Reading, United Kingdom: Ithaca Press.
- Saint-Prot, Charles. "Le nationalisme arabe". Paris, Ellipses, 1995, in French, translated in Arabic, Alger, 1996
- Thomas, David S. 1976. The First Arab Congress and the Committee of Union and Progress, 1913-1914. In "Essays on Islamic Civilization", ed. Donald P. Little. Leiden, Netherlands: E.J. Brill.
- Tibi, Bassam. 1981. Arab Nationalism: A Critical Enquiry. New York: St. Martin's Press.
