= Al-Fatat =

20th century Arab nationalist organization

- Young Arab Society
- جمعية العربية الفتاة
- Formation: 14 November 1909
- Founder: Ahmad Qadri; Awni Abd al-Hadi; Rustam Haidar
- Headquarters: Paris (1911–1913); Beirut (1913–1914); Damascus (1914–1920)
- Region served: Ottoman Empire: Beirut vilayet; Aleppo vilayet; Damascus vilayet; Jerusalem Mutasarrifate; Mount Lebanon Mutasarrifate; Nablus Sanjak; Acre Sanjak; Arab Kingdom of Syria
- Members: 169 official members (1920)
- Official language: Arabic

Al-Fatat (Arabic: الفتاة, al-Fatat) or the Young Arab Society (Arabic: جمعية العربية الفتاة, Jam’iyat al-’Arabiya al-Fatat) was an underground Arab nationalist organization in the Ottoman Empire. Its aims were to gain independence and unify various Arab territories that were then under Ottoman rule. It found adherents in areas such as Syria. The organization maintained contacts with the reform movement in the Ottoman Empire and included many radicals and revolutionaries, such as Abd al-Mirzai. They were closely linked to the Al-Ahd, or Covenant Society, who had members in positions within the military, most were quickly dismissed after Enver Pasha gained control in Turkey. This organization's parallel in activism were the Young Turks, who had a similar agenda that pertained to Turkish nationalism.

== History ==
=== Founding and early years in Paris ===
Al-Fatat was formed in the aftermath of the Young Turk Revolution in 1908. The original founders of the movement were Arab students who felt offended by what they perceived as the Young Turks' Turkish nationalist agenda and Turkish domination over ethnic groups within the Ottoman Empire. The three Arab students were Ahmad Qadri of Damascus, Awni Abd al-Hadi of Nablus and Rustam Haidar of Baalbek. The trio decided to form an underground organization based on the Young Turks' model but with the purpose of protecting Arab rights. While in Paris, the trio was expanded by two Arab students from Beirut, Tawfiq al-Natur and Muhammad al-Mihmisani and another student from Nablus, Rafiq al-Tamimi.

Together, the students founded the "Society of Dad Speakers" on 14 November 1909. "Dad Speakers" was a reference to the Arabs, whose alphabet contains the consonant ض, (approximately pronounced dad), a feature unique to the Arabic language. The name of their organization was quickly changed to "Society of the Young Arab Nation" and later shortened to "Young Arab Society" (Jam'iyat al-Arab al-Fatat). Wary that the word "Arab" could attract the Ottoman government's attention, the organization shortened its name further to "al-Fatat".

The Administrative Committee, in effect the supreme body of al-Fatat's hierarchy, was established in Paris in 1911 by the organization's original members with the addition of Sabri al-Khawja of Iraq. Al-Fatat continued to expand and by early 1913, the Administrative Committee was joined by Sayf al-Din al-Khatib, Subhi al-Hasibi, Jamil Mardam, Mustafa al-Shihabi of Damascus, Ibrahim Haidar and Yusuf Mukhaibar Haidar of Baalbek, Rafiq Rizq Sallum, a Greek Orthodox Christian from Homs, and Tawfiq Fa'id and Abd al-Ghani al-Uraysi of Beirut. The latter owned and edited the Al-Mufid newspaper and provided al-Fatat with a mode for public expression, while Sayf al-Din, Yusuf Mukhaibar and Rafiq Rizq were members of the Istanbul-based Literary Society. Other members to join prior to 1913 were Tawfiq al-Suwaydi of Iraq, Arif al-Shihabi and Tawfiq al-Basat of Damascus, Umar Hamad of Beirut, Muhibb al-Din al-Khatib of Cairo and Rashid al-Husami, a judiciary official from al-Karak.

=== Arab Congress of 1913 and aftermath ===
In early 1913, some of al-Fatat's high-ranking members decided that a congress of Arab societies should be held in Paris and through one of their members, Muhibb al-Din, who was also a deputy leader of the Cairo-based Ottoman Party for Administrative Decentralization, the latter party agreed to participate. The purpose of the congress was to disseminate al-Fatat's ideas. None of al-Fatat's seven delegates identified themselves as members of the organization. Most delegates to the congress, who were roughly divided between Muslims and Christians mostly from Ottoman Syria, came from the Decentralization Party, one of whose members, Abd al-Karim al-Zahrawi, chaired the summit. The resolution of the Arab Congress in June centered on the administrative autonomy of the Arab provinces, Arabic's adoption as an official language in the empire and the institution of democracy to save the Ottoman Empire from "decay".

Following the conclusion of the Arab Congress, negotiations began between the Decentralization Party and the Committee of Union and Progress (CUP) in July. In a bid to undermine the efforts of the Arab reformist movement, the CUP secretly agreed to adopt the teaching of Arabic in primary and secondary schools and allow the Arab provinces a degree of autonomy. The CUP's offer was rescinded when the Decentralization Party made the offer public. According to Palestinian historian Muhammad Y. Muslih, the CUP used the public disclosure of the offer as a pretext to end the negotiations. The breakdown of the talks was followed by the CUP's attempts to co-opt various Arab reformers by offering Ottoman parliamentary seats to those who defected from their respective Arab reformist society.

=== Headquarters in Syria ===
The tricolor flag of al-Fatat was adopted in 1914. The green symbolizes the Fatimids, the white symbolizes the Umayyads, and the black symbolizes the Abbasids.

Following the 1913 congress, most of al-Fatat's student founders returned to their homes in Ottoman Syria and the headquarters of the organization was moved to Beirut, with a branch in Damascus. Al-Mihmisani was elected secretary-general of the movement, while Qadri became head of the Damascus branch. The movement expanded further with the addition of Shukri al-Quwatli and Muslim scholar and secondary school teacher Kamal al-Qassab of Damascus, and as a result of the merger between al-Fatat and al-Ikhwan al-Ashara (Ten Brothers Society). The name of the Ten Brothers Society referred to the first ten sahaba (companions) of the Islamic prophet Muhammad. The group was led by its founder Muhammad al-Shurayqi and had branches in Latakia, Tripoli, Damascus and Beirut.

The core members of the Beirut headquarters of al-Fatat met weekly and al-Mihmisani composed documents containing details of the meetings which were then sent out to members based in places outside of Beirut. The members based outside of Beirut were not given an indication of the location from which the letters originated from with "The Desert" being named by al-Mihmisani as the address of origin. In March 1914, the Beirut headquarters decided to adopt a flag for al-Fatat consisting of the colors white, black and green which symbolized the Arab-led caliphates of the Umayyads, the Abbasids and the Fatimids, respectively. The flag was officially composed by Muhibb al-Din in Cairo with cooperation from the Decentralization Party's secretary-general Haqqi al-Azm, who also agreed to adopt the flag for his party. Thereafter, al-Fatat's members carried badges with the tricolor.

In August 1914, al-Mihmisani and Muhibb al-Din met in Cairo where they agreed that al-Fatat and the Decentralization Party would from then on would coordinate with the Arab Sharifs of the Hejaz. Muhibb al-Din also notified al-Mihmisani that his party had begun establishing contacts with British officials. However, with the start of World War I and the Ottoman Empire's entry to the war in alliance with the Central Powers and against the British, al-Fatat decided to cooperate with "Turkey in order to resist foreign penetration of whatever kind or form" in the Arab provinces. This decision was made after al-Fatat relocated its headquarters to Damascus in October 1914, shortly after the Ottoman Fourth Army moved its headquarters to Damascus.

The decision to support the Ottoman war effort came about despite the formation of a faction within al-Fatat, led by al-Qassab, among others, that favored total independence from the Ottomans. Al-Qassab had established contacts with the British in Cairo requesting their support for the establishment of an independent Arab state consisting of the Ottomans' Arab provinces and a promise from them to prevent Syria from falling under French control. The British did not respond to al-Qassab's request, and he also found no conclusive support for independence from members of the Decentralization Party. According to Israeli historian, "apparently the lack of response on the part of the British and perhaps also the relative freedom the Arabs still enjoyed in Syria at that time, before Jamal Pasha's regime, led the society to finally cooperate with the Ottomans."

=== Struggle for Arab independence ===
Al-Fatat's attitudes towards the Ottomans radically changed with the Ottoman governor Jamal Pasha's repressive rule during mid-1915. As a result, al-Fatat became devoted to Arab independence. However, Jamal Pasha's centralization policies, and his repressive actions against the growing Arab nationalist movement, which included the execution, imprisonment or exile of the movement's leaders, rendered al-Fatat unable to instigate a revolt against the Ottomans in Syria. Nonetheless, al-Fatat's covert political activism escalated and in January 1915, the organization sought the support of Emir Faisal, the son of Sharif Hussein of Mecca, to launch a revolt against the Ottomans. The contact with which al-Fatat communicated with Emir Faisal was the Damascus notable and al-Fatat member Ahmad Fawzi Bey al-Bakri. Specifically, al-Fatat sought to have Emir Faisal lead a revolt using Arab soldiers based in Syria.

Emir Faisal visited members of al-Fatat in Damascus in March 1915 to gauge their preparation and dedication for a revolt. Soon after initial meeting, Emir Faisal was sworn into the organization. During his meetings in Damascus, al-Fatat and al-'Ahd, an Arab nationalist movement mostly consisting of officers from Iraq, devised the Damascus Protocol. The document outlined the groups' conditions on cooperation with the British, namely the establishment of an independent and united state consisting of the Arab territories of the Ottoman Empire, namely the regions of greater Syria, including Palestine and the Lebanon, Iraq and the Arabian Peninsula. This new Arab state, in turn, would enter into a military alliance with Great Britain upon the latter's recognition of such a state. The Damascus Protocol swayed Faisal into firmly supporting a revolt against the Ottomans. Faisal managed to gain backing for the revolt from his father and his brother, Abdullah. In June 1916, the Hashemites of the Hejaz led by Sharif Hussein launched the Arab Revolt against the Ottomans in June 1916 with British support.

=== Role in the Arab Kingdom of Syria ===
On 18 December 1918 the Sharifian Army backed by Triple Entente forces, who by then defeated the Ottomans, entered Damascus, and British general Edmund Allenby assigned al-Fatat member and Ottoman corps commander Ali Rida al-Rikabi as Chief Administrator of Internal Syria on 3 October. In effect, Rikabi became the governor of Damascus and coordinated with al-Fatat's central committee to administer the country. This marked the beginning of al-Fatat's political domination of Emir Faisal's government. Al-Fatat vocally made clear its opposition to European political influence, asserting in a resolution that Syria "adheres to its absolute independence and unity according to the principles on which the great Arab revolt of [Sharif] Husayn was based". Following an announcement by France's foreign minister regarding the establishment of French interests in Syria in December, al-Fatat protested the statement and adopted a policy of opposition to European, particularly French, intervention in Syria's affairs.

Al-Fatat drafted a new party constitution in December 1918, replacing the 1909 version. The new constitution asserted, among its 80 articles, that al-Fatat's goal is to achieve the full independence of all Arab countries and to strengthen the "Arab consciousness within all strata of the Arab nation". The constitution also stipulated that al-Fatat would officially remain a secret society "for the present, in light of the general political situation", but that it would "invest efforts to lead the government according to its political line of action". The central committee also decided to restructure the organization due to the influx of new members following Faisal's establishment in Syria. Accordingly, the members who joined prior to the war became known as "the founders" (al-mu'assisun) and "the regulars" (al-adiyun). The former were privy to the identities of all the members of the organization, had the right to elect the secretary-general and treasurer, and had the right to withdraw confidence (with a two-thirds vote) from the central committee. The central committee had the power to negotiate with the major powers, such as France and the United Kingdom. At the time of Faisal's entry into Syria, Rafiq al-Tamimi was secretary-general and al-Natur was treasurer. Due to al-Tamimi's assignment as representative of Faisal's government in Beirut, the central committee decided to appoint Izzat Darwaza in his place in May 1919, while Shukri al-Quwatli was appointed treasurer. Despite his senior administrative role in Faisal's government, al-Rikabi was not elected to the central committee. As military governor, al-Rikabi maintained a relatively conciliatory approach with the European powers.

In order to reconcile its official secrecy while also participating in public office, on 5 February 1919, the party established the Independence Party (Hizb al-Istiqlal) headed by central committee member Tawfiq al-Natur as a public body of the organization. The Independence Party was also established to accommodate the many newer members or potential members that old cadres within al-Fatat worried were indecisively devoted to al-Fatat's cause, without compromising al-Fatat's ability to influence the Syrian government. The Independence Party's actions and policies reflected the decisions of al-Fatat's central committee. Prior to the party's formation, many senior Syrian leaders and personalities were sworn in as founders, including War Minister Yusuf al-'Azma, Syrian National Congress chairman Rashid Rida, congressmen Wasfi al-Atassi, Adil Arslan, Subhi al-Tawil and Sa'id al-Tali'a, and Sami al-Sarraj, the editor-in-chief of the Aleppo-based newspaper Al-Arab. Independence Party member As'ad Daghir estimated the party had 75,000 members, although historian Muhammad Y. Muslih considers that figure to be exaggerated.

Attitudes toward European influence had divided al-Fatat into roughly three factions by the time the US-led King–Crane Commission arrived in Syria to gauge popular sentiment about the notions of Syrian independence and unity and European stewardship. According to Darwaza, one faction, known as "the dissenters" (al-rafidun), rejected European control in Syria per the 1916 Sykes–Picot Agreement and a Jewish homeland in Palestine per the 1917 Balfour Declaration. This faction included Darwaza, al-Tamimi, Sa'id Haydar, al-Muraywid, Khalid al-Hakim, al-Qassab and Ibrahim al-Qasim. The second faction led by Emir Faisal and the Hashemites supported British influence instead of French influence, but also called for modifications to the Sykes–Picot Agreement in light of the Sharifian Army's key contribution to the Entente's war effort. The third faction supported American supervision over Syria. Other causes of rifts within al-Fatat included decisions on the borders of the Arab state, the Arab military, and regionalist tendencies. Al-Fatat did not have an effective mechanism to enforce the decisions of its central committee. As a result, powerful members such as al-Rikabi and President of the War Council Yasin al-Hashimi regularly ignored the central committee's resolutions and used their influence to impose their own agendas on Emir Faisal's administration. Nearly 40% al-Fatat's founders were also concurrent members of other organizations with agendas different from al-Fatat, which aggravated the emerging division's within the organization.

== Membership ==
Prior to the establishment of King Faisal's rule in Damascus, al-Fatat consisted of roughly 70 members, the vast majority of whom were scholars, journalists and professionals. Most had advanced educations. Another count of al-Fatat's members prior to Faisal's rule was 115, although 13 of these members were executed by the Ottoman authorities. During Faisal's rule, membership in al-Fatat swelled to 169 official members. This was largely due to the influence al-Fatat had with Faisal's government, and the administrative jobs and funds it provided. Thus, many who sought employment in the new government understood that access was tied to membership in al-Fatat. The organization shifted from a secretive society with a rigid membership process to a virtual political patronage network whose membership rules were subsequently discarded. According to an original al-Fatat member, Izzat Darwaza, many of the new members "were driven by the desire [for jobs] ... and there was among them [those] who were vague in morals, spirit, heart and patriotism, as well as opportunists."

== Ideology ==
The preamble of al-Fatat's constitution stated that "The Arab nation is behind the other nations socially, economically and politically. Its youth are therefore obliged to dedicate their lives to awakening it from this backwardness, and they must consider what will lead to its progress, so that it will attain the meaning of life and preserve its natural rights". The original intent of al-Fatat was not secession of the Arab-dominated regions from the Ottoman Empire, but instead the establishment of equal rights with Turks within the empire.

== Bibliography ==
- Gelvin, James L. (1999). Divided Loyalties: Nationalism and Mass Politics in Syria at the Close of Empire. University of California Press. ISBN 9780520919839.
- Muslih, Muhammad Y. (1988). The Origins of Palestinian Nationalism. Columbia University Press. p. 143. ISBN 9780231065092. "al-fatat."
- Tauber, Eliezer (2013). The Formation of Modern Iraq and Syria. Routledge. ISBN 9781135201180.
