= Rafiq al-Azm =

Rafīq Bey ibn Mahmūd al-ʿAzm
- رفيق بك بن محمود العظم
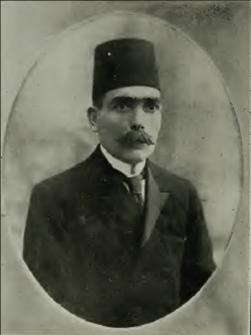
- Born: 1865; Damascus, Ottoman Empire
- Died: 4 July 1925 (aged 59–60); Cairo, Egypt
- Political party: Ottoman Party for Administrative Decentralization
- Relatives: Haqqi al-Azm (cousin)

Rafīq Bey ibn Mahmūd al-ʿAzm (Arabic: رفيق بك بن محمود العظم, 1865-1925) was a Syrian intellectual, author, and politician. 'Azm served as the president of the Ottoman Party for Administrative Decentralization and was a key figure in the intellectual formation of Arabism.

Rafiq was born in 1865 in Damascus, Ottoman Empire to the 'Azm family, one of the city's mostly politically and socially influential families. He received an education in French and Arabic in Damascus and Istanbul.

As a young man, 'Azm became involved in a group of reformist ulama who believed in restoration of the empire's 1876 constitution. During the reign of Abdul Hamid II 'Azm joined the Young Turks. He later joined the Committee of Union and Progress (CUP), an underground organization that advocated for liberal reforms. In 1894 Ottoman authorities began cracking down on constitutionalists and their organizations, including the CUP; in the same year 'Azm fled to Cairo, Egypt.

In Egypt, 'Azm met Rashid Rida; together, the two founded the Ottoman Consultation Society (Jam'iyyat al-Shura al-'Uthmaniyya), a diverse, Ottoman focused society that pushed back against Turkish nationalism. 'Azm served as editor of the Arabic-language portion of the OCS's publications and its treasurer. Following the 1908 Young Turk Revolution the society was disbanded; 'Azm visited Istanbul and joined the Ottoman Party for Administrative Decentralization.

As part of the Ottoman Party for Administrative Decentralization, Rafiq al-ʿAzm along with his cousin Haqqi al-Azm opposed proposals to exclude non-Arabs and non-Muslims from the party, pushing for the affirmative inclusion of Jews, Druzes, and Christians in order to best reflect the makeup of Syria. Rafiq, as president, closely associated the party with another opposition party, the Freedom and Accord Party headed by Sadiq Bey, which shared the goal of granting the Arab states increased autonomy. In April 1913, 'Azm on behalf of his party, accepted an invitation to the Arab Congress of 1913, to which he sent two delegates.

Rafiq al Azm died on 4 July 1925.

== See also ==
- Declaration to the Seven
