= Le Liban =

Masonic Lodge

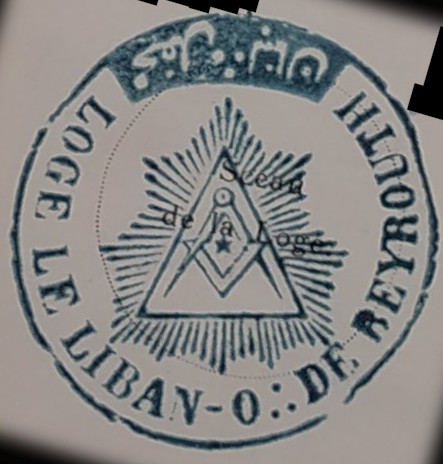
- Seal of the lodge
- Established: 1868
- Location: Lebanon; Beirut

Le Liban is a Masonic Lodge founded in Beirut on the 29th of July, 1868 under the auspices of the Grand Orient de France.

== History ==
The lodge was created on 29 July 29, 1868. The temple was then located in the now-disappeared district of Gargoul in Beirut, where the Freemasons met every Thursday.

Twelve of its eighteen founding members were from the "Palestine No. 415" Lodge, created in Beirut on the 6th of May, 1861, under the authority of the Grand Lodge of Scotland.

== Mission ==
The lodge aims to reinforce the associative environment, aiming to emancipate the consciences through knowledge and science. It is also a space allowing free exchange of ideas, at a time when freedom of expression was restricted under the incipient power of the Ottoman Sultan Abdul Hamid II.
