= Kamal Dib =

Canadian-Lebanese scholar and writer

- Born: Lebanon
- Education: University of Ottawa; Carelton University
- Occupations: professor, writer, scholar

Kamal Dib (Arabic: كمال ديب), a Canadian-Lebanese scholar and professor of political and economic studies. He has published more than 13 books on economic and social issues of the Arab countries and Canada and has published hundreds of research and studies in economic. He is a professor of economics at the University of Ottawa and Algonquin College.

== Education and career ==
Kamal Dib is Canadian scholar of Lebanese origin. He published autobiographical material in a 2014 book "Beirut Culture Shock A Canadian Tale". He graduated from the University of Ottawa with a master's degree in economics, and an MA in International Development from the Norman Paterson School of International Affairs, Carelton University, Canada for Graduate Studies in Ottawa, a postgraduate Diploma in Economic Development from Ottawa university, and a PhD in economics from Joint Doctoral Program of Ottawa - Carleton; picking an interest in German culture, he completed a BA in German Studies in 2010. Dib is a member of the following: Arab and German Culture Association, International Metropolis Project Committee for Immigration and Pluralism Affairs, and the Canadian Economic Experts Association.

Dib has worked as a director of economic and social research in the Canadian government for fifteen years, then worked in the Ministry of Finance in Canada in public debt affairs. He currently hold the position of Chief Economist in the Canadian government and Head of the Center for Social and Economic Research and Cultural Studies in Canada. He also works as a professor in economics at the University of Ottawa and Algonquin College. Dib has published his first book "Labor Supply in the UN ESCWA Region" in 1995. He has many publications about the economic situation in many Arab countries, including Iraq as in his book "A Summary of the History of Iraq", Syria "Contemporary History of Syria from the French Mandate to the Summer", Lebanon "Warlords and Temple Traders Hidden Men Power and Money in Lebanon", and Canada in his book "Public Pension in Canada". He has published more than 13 books on economic and social situation and issues, in addition to numerous studies and research on financial crises and cultural activities, most of which have been published in An-Nahar newspaper.

== Works ==
Some of his works include the followings:

- Labor Supply in the UN ESCWA Region, 1995
- Public Pensions in Canada, 1998
- The Human and Physical cost of War in Lebanon, 2001
- Employment Equity in Canada 2003.
- Warlords and Merchants, 2004
- Youssef Bedas Intra Empire and Money Sharks in Lebanon Volume 1 (2015 al-Maktaba al-Sharquiya Librairie Orientale)
- Roger Tamraz Intra Empire and Money Sharks in Lebanon Volume 2 (2017, al-Maktaba al-Sharquiya Librairie Orientale)
- Rafic Hariri Intra Empire and Money Sharks in Lebanon Volume 3 (2020, al-Maktaba al-Sharquiya Librairie Orientale)
- Syria in History Souria fi al-Tarikh (2016, al-Maktaba al-Sharquiya Librairie Orientale)
- Magdala Lebanese Novel (2019, al-Maktaba al-Sharquiya Librairie Orientale)
- Histoire Culturelle du Liban (Tarikh Lubnan al Thakafi) (2018, al-Maktaba al-Sharquiya Librairie Orientale)
- Un précis de l'histoire de l'Irak (Mojaz Tarikh al-Iraq) (Dar-Farabi, 2013)
- The Curse of Cain Natural Gaz Wars in Russia, Iran, Qatar Lebanon and Syria (La'nat Qayin: Houroub al-Ghaz) Dar al-Farabi 2018.
- Coming out soon:Presidents and Crisis: from Charles Debbas to Michel Aoun (Ohoud wa Azamat), Beirut, Dar Annahar, 2022.
- Coming out soon: Predator Neoliberalism: The Predicament of Lebanon from the Intra Crisis 1966 to 2022, Dar Annahar, 2022.
- Coming out soon: Angela: from East Beirut to West Berlin (Novel), Beirut, Dar Annahar, 2022.
