= Haqqi al-Azm =

Syrian politician

Haqqi al-Azm حقي العظم
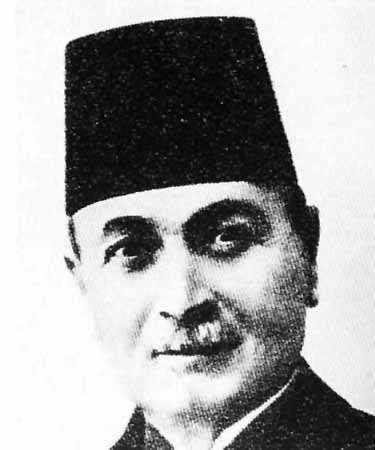

7th Prime Minister of Syria
- In office 7 June 1932 – 16 March 1934
- President: Muhammad Ali al-Abid
- Preceded by: Taj al-Din al-Hasani
- Succeeded by: Taj al-Din al-Hasani

Governor of the State of Damascus
- In office 30 November 1920 – 28 June 1922
- Preceded by: Office established
- Succeeded by: Office abolished

Personal details
- Born: 1864 Damascus, Ottoman Syria
- Died: 1955 (aged 91) Cairo, Egypt
- Relations: Rafiq al-Azm (cousin)

Haqqi al-Azm (Arabic: حقي العظم / ALA-LC: Ḥaqqī al-‘Aẓm; 1864, in Damascus – 1955) was a Syrian politician active during the late Ottoman period and during the First Syrian Republic. From 1932 to 1934, he served as Prime Minister of Syria under the presidency of Muhammad Ali Bey al-Abid. He was a co-founder of the Ottoman Party for Administrative Decentralization.

== Early life and education ==
Haqqi al-Azm was born in Damascus, Ottoman Syria, in 1864 to the prominent Al-Azm family. He was educated at the Lazarist missionary school in Damascus and later at the military academy in Istanbul.

He began his career as a government clerk, but was soon promoted to the prestigious position of inspector-general at the Ministry of Awqaf. Al-Azm was laid off in 1911 when the Turkish nationalist Committee of Union and Progress (CUP) seized control of the ministry in 1911.

== Ottoman political career ==
Al-Azm was an unsuccessful candidate in the 1912 Ottoman parliamentary election. Following his defeat, al-Azm moved to Cairo, and helped found the opposition party, Ottoman Party for Administrative Decentralization.

The CUP interpreted diplomatic correspondence between the party and French and British agents as a proof that the party was aiming to guarantee the cession of the Arabic-speaking provinces from the Ottoman Empire. In 1913, al-Azm and other figures in the party were sentenced to death in absentia and they lived as exiles in Cairo. He was also president of the Cairo bureau of the Central Syrian Committee, a French-backed organization which promoted the cession of Syria from the Ottoman Empire since 1908.

== Independent Syrian political career ==
After World War I, al-Azm was a key opponent of Hijazi involvement in Syria. He opposed the Arab Revolt and called it the "Hijazi revolt". He allied himself with the French mandate authorities, and was appointed the first governor of the State of Damascus in 1921. He reportedly won friends inside the administration by handing out jobs. In 1921 he narrowly escaped an assassination attempt while on visit to Quneitra with the French High Commissioner Henri Gouraud.

In 1932, following the election of Muhammad Ali al-Abid, he was invited to form a cabinet, but the nationalist leaders boycotted the parliament. His rule between 1932 and 1934 was met with large opposition from the National Bloc. Al-Azm later died in 1955 at the age of 91 in Cairo.

== Bibliography ==
- Khoury, Philip S. (2003), Urban Notables and Arab Nationalism: The Politics of Damascus 1860-1920, Cambridge University Press, ISBN 978-0-521-53323-2
- Tauber, Eliezer (1995), The formation of modern Syria and Iraq, Routledge, ISBN 978-0-7146-4557-5
- Dumper, Michael; Stanley, Bruce E. (2007), Cities of the Middle East and North Africa: a historical encyclopedia, ABC-CLIO, ISBN 978-1-57607-919-5

Preceded by Taj al-Din al-Hasani	Prime Minister of Syria; 7 June 1932 – 16 March 1934	Succeeded by Taj al-Din al-Hasani
