= Georges Samné =

Syrian intellectual (1877–1938)

- Native name: جورج سمنة
- Born: May 15, 1877 Mansura, Khedivate of Egypt
- Died: December 9, 1938 (aged 61) Paris, France
- Occupation: Physician; writer
- Notable works: Au Pays du chérif

Georges Samné (also Samneh; Arabic: جورج سمنة; May 15, 1877 – December 9, 1938) was a Syrian Francophone medical doctor, nationalist intellectual, colonial publicist, and writer. In 1917, he co-founded the Comité Central Syrien together with Chekri Ganem.

== Biography ==
Samné was born in Mansura, Egypt, on May 15, 1877, to Greek Orthodox parents of Syrian descent.

Samné participated in scholarly and political societies, where he debated the unique role of French colonialism and expansion in the acculturation of the world. He pushed for the French expansion into the Orient. During World War I, he served as advisor to the French government for Syrian affairs, lobbying for the cessation of Greater Syria from the Ottoman Empire. Samné was a supporter of French colonialism. He believed that a universal approach to treating diseases does not suit colonialized peoples, and touted the role of "French women" in spreading "woman to woman" hygiene and public health education to colonized Muslim Tuareg and Bedouin tribes. In August 1908, he founded with his Lebanese friend Chekri Ganem the Société des amis de l'Orient. The organization's goals were to promote French interests in the Levant, and to circulate news about the Near East, through the society's bulletin, the Correspondance d'Orient. He was a founding member of the Central Syrian Committee, which lobbied for the independence and the unity of Syria.

== Bibliography ==
=== In history and politics ===
- La Vie politique orientale en 1909 (1910)
- Le Liban autonome (de 1861 à nos jours) (1919)
- La Question sioniste (1919)
- Le Chérifat de la Mecque et l'Unité syrienne (1919)
- L'Effort syrien pendant la Guerre (1919)
- La Khalifat et le Panislamisme (1919)
- La Syrie (1920)
- Raymond Poincaré; Politique et Personnel de la IIIe république (1933)
- Au Pays du chérif

=== In medicine ===
- Les Insuffisances de la croissance (1904)
