= Chekri Ganem =

Lebanese writer and journalist (1861–1929)

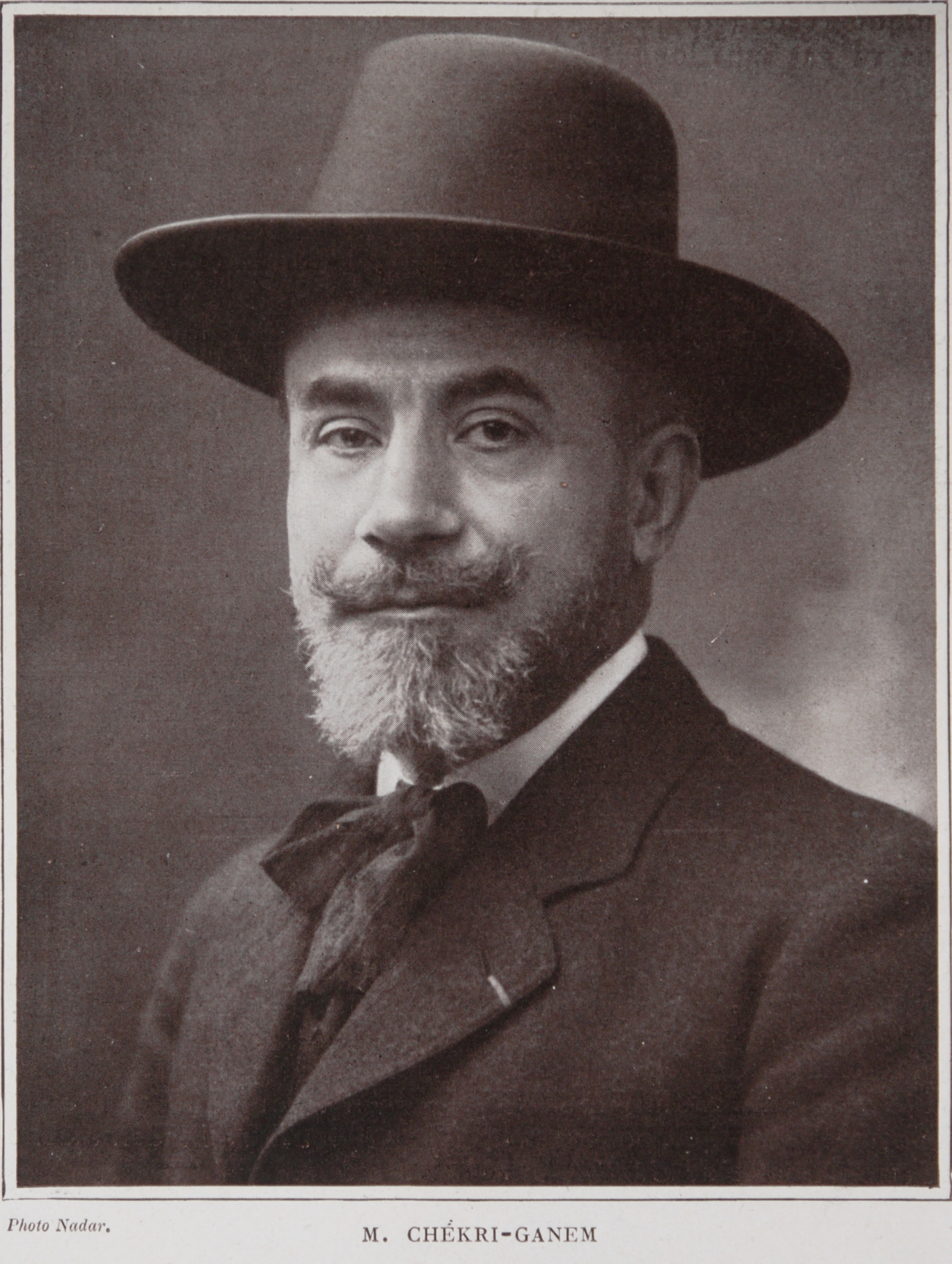
- Native name: شكري ابن إبراهيم غانم
- Born: 14 September 1861 Beirut, Ottoman Empire
- Died: 3 May 1929 (aged 67) Antibes, France
- Occupation: Novelist; poet; playwright; journalist; political activist
- Notable works: Ronces et Fleurs; Antar; Daad; La Giaour
- Spouse: Anaïs-Marie Couturier
- Relatives: Halil Ganem (brother)

Signature
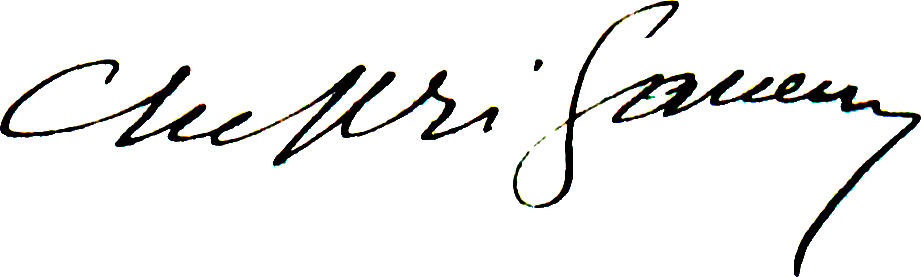

Chekri Ganem (also spelled Chekri Ghanem or Shukri Ghanim; Arabic: شكري ابن إبراهيم غانم / ALA-LC: Shukrī ibn Ibrāhīm Ghānim; 1861 – 3 May 1929) was a Lebanese intellectual, writer, playwright, poet, and journalist. He traveled extensively, and finally settled in France in 1895. In Paris, he became a dynamic political activist and leader in the Syro-Lebanese diaspora. He founded the Société des Amis de l'Orient (Society of Friends of the Orient) in 1908 and the Lebanese Committee of Paris in 1912. He also played a significant role in the Arab Congress of 1913, where he was elected vice president. Ganem was a proponent of Lebanon's independence from the Ottoman Empire. He is considered the founding father of Francophone Lebanese literature, and his literary work was overtly political, becoming most manifest in his poetry collection Ronces et Fleurs (Brambles and Flowers). His masterpiece, Antar, was a widely-acclaimed theatrical fantasy, and an open manifesto of Arab nationalism. Ganem was named Commander of the Legion of Honor shortly before his death in 1929.

== Early life and education ==
Ganem was born on 14 September 1861 in Beirut, then part of the Ottoman Empire, to a well-to-do Maronite family from Lehfed. He grew up in the midst of rising sectarianism and mass emigration, following the 1860 civil conflict in Mount Lebanon. Ganem received a French education at the Lazarist College of Antoura where he was exposed to European culture and ideals. He started dabbling with poetry at an early age,^{[a]} an affinity that would play a major role in his future career. According to Ganem, he had to flee Lebanon at the age of 18, after having violently aggressed a Turkish soldier who was molesting a young lady. Chekri was the younger brother of Ottoman parliamentarian and Young Turk reformist intellectual Halil (Khalil) Ganem.

== Career ==
From Lebanon, Ganem traveled to Egypt, then to the French Protectorate of Tunisia, Florence, and Austria where he served as a translator and bureaucrat. In Tunisia, he was employed as archivist of the French Protectorate under Resident Minister Paul Cambon. In 1895, he settled in Paris, where his brother Halil resided. In the following years he became a dynamic political activist and leader, liaising with powerful regional and international players, such as the Maronite Patriarch Elias Peter Hoayek, Lebanese nationalists, and Arab nationalists.

Ganem welcomed the Young Turk Revolution of July 1908, wrongly assuming that it would relieve the Arab provinces suffering under Sultan Abdul Hamid II rule. In August 1908, he founded with his Damascene friend Georges Samné the Société des amis de l'Orient (Society of the Friends of the Orient). The organization's goals were to promote relations between France and the Ottoman Empire, and to circulate news about the Near East through the society's bulletin, the Correspondance d'Orient.

In 1912, he founded the Lebanese Committee of Paris with Khairallah Khairallah; the committee's goals included the reform of the organic statute regulating Mount Lebanon. His goals matched those of the committees established by Lebanese diaspora press figures, such as Naoum Mokarzel and Asad Bishara in New York and São Paulo respectively.

Ganem assiduously lobbied with the French foreign affairs authorities at the Quai d'Orsay so that Paris would host the Arab Congress of 1913. He was elected vice president of the Congress, which was organized by 25 official Arab Nationalist delegates. The congress convened at the French Geographical Society to discuss desired reforms, and to express their discontent with Ottoman policies. Furthermore, it demanded more autonomy for Syrians and Arabs living under the Ottoman Empire.

In August 1914, he was summoned for conscription in the Ottoman Imperial Army. He did not abide and refused to report to Beirut, where some former delegates of the Congress were executed by hanging. Ganem and Samné coordinating the efforts of the Lebanese-Syrian diaspora through the Central Syrian Committee, which they created with the support of the French Ministry of Foreign Affairs in 1916. The organization, became a rallying point for Lebanese and Syrian emigrants in Dakar, Conakry, Montreal, Manchester, Sydney, New York, Santiago de Chile and São Paulo who sought the independence, and territorial integrity of Greater Syria.

== Literary work ==
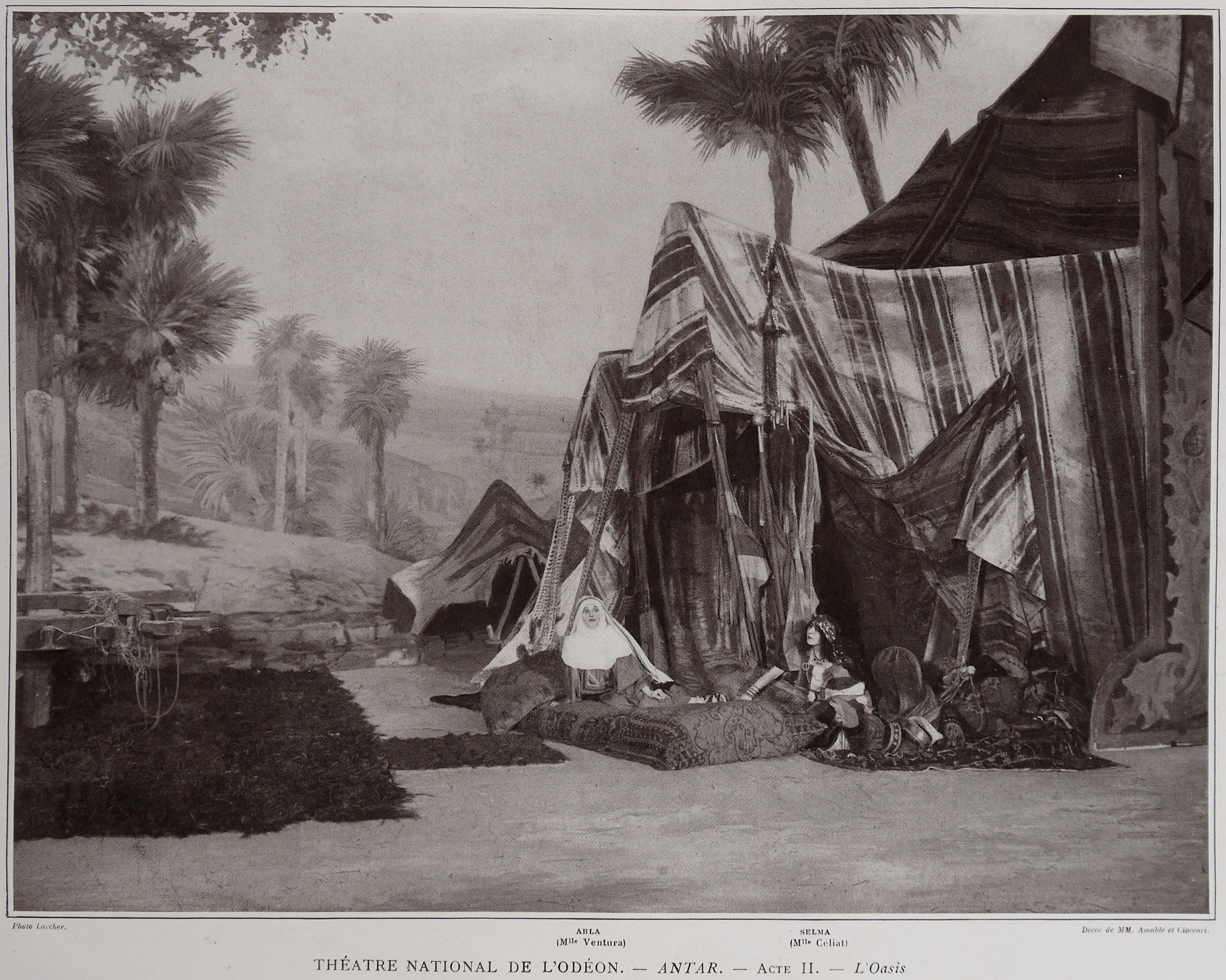
Antar at the Odéon theater, published in Le Théatre magazine in March 1910

Ganem is considered the founding father of Lebanese literature of French expression. He was among the group of authors in the Syro-Lebanese diaspora who sought to promote a Catholic Francophile future for Syria. He demanded self-rule and increased representation in the Ottoman administration, and ultimately the independence of Lebanon. Ganem's ideology imbued his political publications and literary works, drawing upon his missionary education in the Lazarists school in Antoura. Ganem idolized the French culture as the pinnacle of civilization, and drew Orientalist images of the Levant in his writings and poetry.

Ganem's literary work was overtly political, becoming most manifest in his poetry collection Ronces et Fleurs (Brambles and Flowers). He composed the collection during his stay in Cairo and Tunisia, and did not publish it until 1896, after his arrival in France. He published his first novel, Daad in 1909, and wrote Antar his theatrical fantasy masterpiece, named after Antarah ibn Shaddad, a pre-Islamic Arab knight and poet, famous for both his poetry and his adventurous life.

The play debuted in debuted on 9 January 1910 at the Théatre de Monte-Carlo, and in Paris' Odéon on 12 February 1910; it received wide acclaim. Gabriel Dupont adapted the theatrical piece into an opera, which was hailed by the critics at its premiere in 1921 at the Théâtre National de l'Opéra. Antar was the first major example of Lebanese Francophone literature, and an open manifesto of Arab nationalism. According to French and Francophone studies expert Martine Sauret, Antar "... was considered the most important event of Arabic nationalism organized abroad". Another of his plays, La Giaour (the Infidel), was set to music by Marc Delmas in 1914.

== Personal life ==
Ganem married Anaïs-Marie Couturier; they lived in an apartment decorated in the Oriental style in Passy, in the 16th arrondissement of Paris. He built La Libanaise, a villa in Antibes in the Lebanese and Moorish Revival Style. He died in his Antibes home on 3 May 1929.

== Honors and distinctions ==
Ganem was naturalized as a French citizen on 22 August 1913, and named Commander of the Legion of Honor on 1 March 1928 for his "services to the French cause in the Levant".

== Notes ==
^a His 1879 poem Adieu au collège is recognized as the second Lebanese French-language poem, the first being Michel Misk’s 1874 poem Souvenir d’une promenade à Nahr Ibrahim.
