= Kamal al-Qassab =

Syrian politician

Sheikh Kamel al-Qassab (1853–1954) was the founder of the Syrian Higher National Committee in 1919. He was born in Damascus, with ancestry from Homs. He was a religious scholar, and a former student of Muḥammad ʿAbduh (1849–1905) in Cairo.

Al-Qassab became known for his public speeches against Ottoman corruption. He was arrested by the Ottoman authorities and imprisoned for several months

After the First World War, he spoke against the British and the French, claiming their goal was to eliminate Islam and occupy his country.

During Mandatory Palestine he travelled to Haifa, established a school there, and then joined the militant Izz ad-Din al-Qassam.

In 1947, the state-run "Faculty of Sharia" was initiated in Damascus by al-Qassab.
