= Ottoman Party for Administrative Decentralization =

Political party in the Ottoman Empire

Ottoman Party for Administrative Decentralization الحزب العثماني للامركزية الإدارية
- President: Rafiq al-Azm
- Secretary: Haqqi al-Azm
- Founded: January 1913
- Headquarters: Cairo
- Ideology: Arab interests Decentralization; Arab nationalism Christian-Muslim Unity

The Ottoman Party for Administrative Decentralization (Hizb al-lamarkaziyya al-idariyya al-'uthmani) was a political party in the Ottoman Empire founded in January 1913. Based in Cairo, the party called for the reform of the Ottoman provincial administration for Arab provinces through decentralization of power and functions, rather than outright independence.

Most support for the party came from Syrian intellectuals and Muslims, though Christians were encouraged to join as well. The party was accused of being political propagandists affiliated with European imperialists.

== History and formation ==
In the wake of the 1908 Young Turk Revolution, the modus vivendi between the Greater Syrian notables and the Ottoman center was disrupted. The power balance between the local notables and the center, which had characterized Sultan Abdul Hamid II's long rule, gave way as supporters of the Committee of Union of Progress (CUP) were given new political privileges and positions at the expense of individuals seen as loyal to the Sultan. Some contemporary Arab commentators remarked that the CUP's Turkification of administration directly contradicted its spoken ideology of Ottomanization. This discontent surfaced immediately following the start of the 1909 countercoup and took on the form of public celebrations as well as planned assassinations of local CUP activists. With the failure of the coup came increased censorship and surveillance of Greater Syria and a flight of many of its intellectuals, either in forced or self-imposed exile, to Paris and Cairo. As a result of this intellectual diaspora and the Khedive's implicit support of press that may destabilize the Ottoman grip on Syrian lands, Cairo emerged as a political and literary hub providing Syrians with freedoms and networks they didn't have before. Following the April 1912 elections, which, one historian recounts, "were arranged so that Unionists [CUP members] won everywhere", disenfranchised Syrian intellectuals realized they could not work within the CUP's political framework and took to creating an organization to advocate decentralization and provincialization.

The resulting product was the Ottoman Party for Administrative Decentralization (or the Ottoman Decentralization Party). It was founded in Cairo in January 1913. Its initial executive committee was a 14-man panel consisting of 8 Muslims, 5 Christians (Michel Tueni, Josef Hani, Pierre Tarrad, Doctor Eyub Sabit, Khalil Zeine), and 1 Druze (Rizcullah Arcash). Rafiq al-Azm was its President, and, his cousin, Haqqi al-Azm was its Secretary.

== Ideology ==
The party's primary spoken goal was to attain greater administrative decentralization throughout the empire. Despite this, their activism revolved almost exclusively on the Arab lands, and Greater Syria in particular. They adopted Switzerland's governmental model as their ideal, noting its autonomous cantons as an appropriate solution. Rather than agitating for independence, the party sought to remain within the Ottoman Empire, albeit with improved political representation and autonomy. This resembled that of the Liberal Union, who at the time were the main opposition party in the Parliament.

By the end of 1913, it had become clear to the party that the CUP would not willingly accept their demands. In response, some members of the party began to espouse complete Syrian independence. Though the party seems to also have worked towards this end during World War I, seemingly no formal document declares its policy as such.

== Membership and reception ==
By late 1913, the party, in a loose coalition with other Arabist movements, had developed a sophisticated networks of clubs, associations, organizations, and parties spanning the Empire's Arab provinces. Known branches include Beirut, Damascus, Jaffa, and Basra. For fear of repression, the party's membership and chapters were shrouded in secrecy. This is reflected in instructions passed on from the leadership to a prominent Palestinian activist in 1913: "Each branch will remain secret until the government recognizes the party officially".

The party heavily relied on Egyptian-based press to spread its ideology. As such, it appealed more to the educated, influential elite than it did to the masses. Despite this, many local Syrian notables, who were in favor with the CUP, opposed the party while many illiterate Arabs, who absorbed the ideas through local newspaper readings, supported it.

== The First World War ==
With the outbreak of the war, the Ottoman state tightened its grip on Arab lands significantly. The nascent Arab nationalist movement, faced with the decision of supporting the state or agitating for independence, became divided. Party activity decreased as members adopted different projects away from the party.

By 1915, Jamal Pasha had begun to imprison Arab intellectuals he deemed disloyal. In many cases, they were sentenced on the grounds of treason on evidence either in the form of testimony of local notables or documents left in the French consulate in Beirut. This violent censorship culminated in the targeted executions of journalists and political activists on August 21, 1915 and on May 6, 1916 (also known as Martyrs' Day).

== See also ==
- Al-Fatat, a similar pre-independence group
