= Central Syrian Committee =

Syrian nationalist organisation

The Central Syrian Committee (French: Comité Central Syrien) was an organization active during after World War I, seeking the independence and the unity of Syria. It lobbied for an autonomous and indivisible Syria extending from the Taurus mountains to the Isthmus of Suez, and from the Mediterranean to the banks of the Euphrates and beyond. The movement did not consider Palestine as a separate political entity.

== At the Versailles Peace Conference ==
The Syrian Delegation met with the Supreme Council of the Versailles Peace Conference on February 13, 1919. The council consisted of Arthur James Balfour and Viscount Milner representing the British Empire, President Woodrow Wilson and Robert Lansing of the United States, French prime minister Georges Clemenceau and French Foreign Affairs Minister Stephen Pichon, Vittorio Emanuele Orlando and Sydney Sonnino for Italy, and Matsui Keishirō for Japan. (Note: Additionally present were Mr. A. J. Toynbee and Major the Honorable W. Ormsby Gore.) The Syrian delegation members were Chekri Ganem, the Central Syrian Committee's top representative, Anis Schehade, Jamil Mardam Bey, Georges Samné, Nejil Bey Maikarze, and Tewfik Farhi.
