= Permanent Mandates Commission (Palestine) =

League of Nations organization

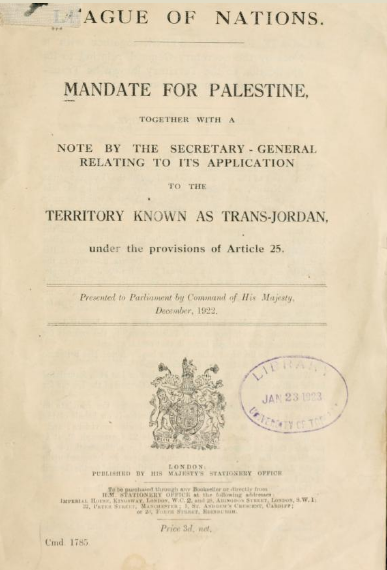
The Mandate for Palestine legal document

The British Mandate for Palestine was finally confirmed in 1922. The civil Mandate administration was formalized with the League of Nations' consent in 1923 following the ratification of the Treaty of Lausanne.

== Background ==
In anticipation of receiving the Mandate the British switched from military to civilian rule with the appointment of Herbert Samuel as High Commissioner as of 1 July 1920. The Commission did not have its first formal review of the Mandate operation until 1924 where as well as the annual report for 1923 they also considered the interim reports for the period 1920–22.

== Mandate versus Declaration ==
The British Mandate for Palestine was the vehicle for delivering the Balfour Declaration. (Note: ...the task of the Mandates Commission was not to judge the wisdom or justice of the Balfour Declaration or its consequences, but merely to examine the administration in the light of the mandate in which the Balfour Declaration was enshrined.(page46))

== Annual reporting ==
The Commission created a questionnaire detailing the matters that they expected to be covered in Mandate reports.

=== UK representatives ===
1921–22, William Ormsby-Gore, 1922–36 Lord Lugard, 1936–39 Lord Hailey and briefly in 1939 Lord Hankey and then Lord Hailey returned.

=== Noteworthy sessions ===
1924 – Samuel travelled to Geneva in November 1924 to explain Britain's policy, at that point being the Churchill White Paper of 1922. The Commission used the term "twofold duty" to refer to the obligations to Jew and non-Jew in the Mandate.

1930 – The phrase "double undertaking" was used by Prime Minister Ramsay MacDonald in his April 1930 House of Commons speech, in his 1931 letter to Chaim Weizmann and later in the Passfield white paper. At the 9 June 1930 Permanent Mandates Commission, the British Accredited Representative, Drummond Shiels, set out the British policy to reconcile the two communities. The Permanent Mandates Commission summarized that "From all these statements two assertions emerge, which should be emphasised: (1) that the obligations laid down by the Mandate in regard to the two sections of the population are of equal weight; (2) that the two obligations imposed on the Mandatory are in no sense irreconcilable. The Mandates Commission has no objection to raise to these two assertions, which, in its view, accurately express what it conceives to be the essence of the Mandate for Palestine and ensure its future." This was later quoted in the Passfield white paper, with the note that: "His Majesty's Government are fully in accord with the sense of this pronouncement and it is a source of satisfaction to them that it has been rendered authoritative by the approval of the Council of the League of Nations." (Note: Also in 1930, on learning that King George V had requested his views about the state of affairs in Palestine, John Chancellor, the High Commissioners for Palestine, wrote a 16-page letter via Lord Stamfordham, the King's Private Secretary. The letter concluded that: "The facts of the situation are that in the dire straits of the war, the British Government made promises to the Arabs and promises to the Jews which are inconsistent with one another and are incapable of fulfilment. The honest course is to admit our difficulty and to say to the Jews that, in accordance with the Balfour Declaration, we have favoured the establishment of a Jewish National Home in Palestine and that a Jewish National Home in Palestine has in fact been established and will be maintained and that, without violating the other part of the Balfour Declaration, without prejudicing the interests of the Arabs, we cannot do more than we have done.")

1937 – The obligation proved to be untenable; as James Renton described it in 2007: "The attempt to create different messages for different audiences regarding the future of the same place, as had been attempted since the fall of Jerusalem, was untenable." and fifteen years after the Mandate had been confirmed, the 1937 Palestine Royal Commission report, the first official proposal for partition of the region, referred to the requirements as "contradictory obligations". and with respect to the wider situation that had arisen in Palestine noted that the "disease is so deep-rooted that, in our firm conviction, the only hope of a cure lies in a surgical operation".

1939 – The Minutes of the 36th Session that ran from June 8 to 29, 1939, including the Report of the Commission to the Council, were not considered by the Council of the League owing to the outbreak of the Second World War in September 1939. Of seven members present, four "did not feel able to state that the policy of the White Paper was in conformity with the Mandate, any contrary conclusion appearing to them to be ruled out by the very terms of the Mandate and by the fundamental intentions of its authors" and three "were unable to share this opinion; they consider that existing circumstances would justify the policy of the White Paper, provided that the Council did not oppose it". The Commission as a whole concluded that "the policy set out in the White Paper was not in accordance with the interpretation, which in agreement with the Mandatory Power, the Commission had alaways placed upon the Palestine Mandate". In reply to the Commission's conclusions by way of a letter of August 5, 1939 to the Council of the League, the UK explained why it disagreed with the conclusions reached by the Commission.
