= Arthur Wauchope =

British diplomat (1874–1947)

General Sir Arthur Wauchope GCB GCMG CIE DSO
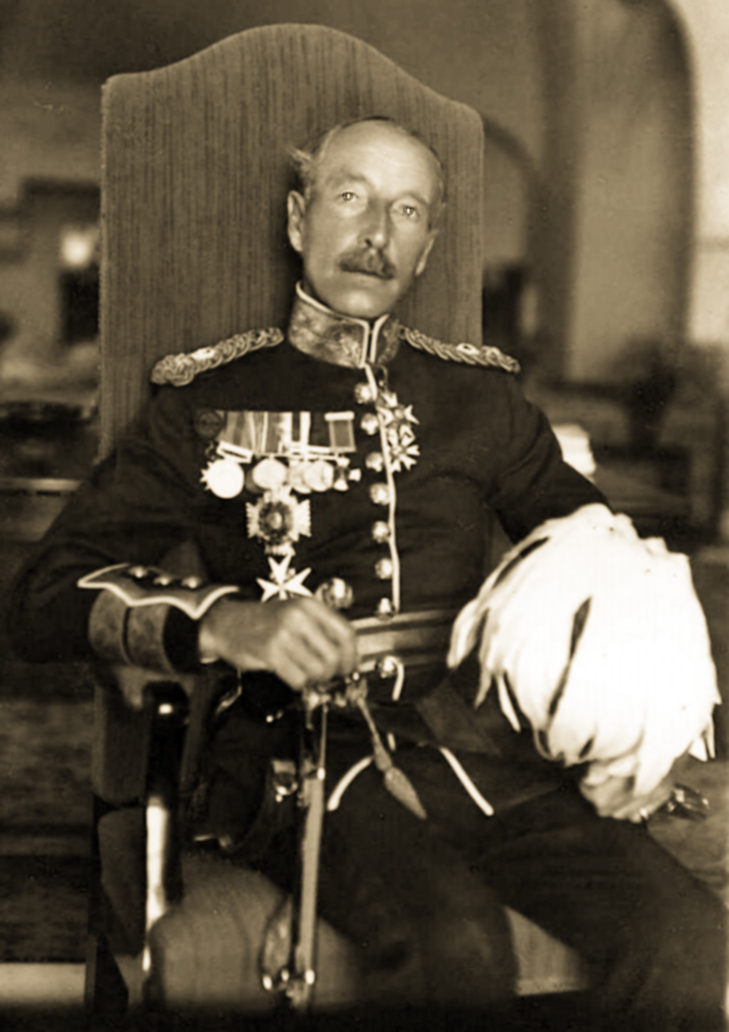
- Wauchope as High Commissioner in Palestine
- Born: 1 March 1874; Edinburgh, Scotland
- Died: 14 September 1947 (aged 73); London, England
- Military career
- Allegiance: United Kingdom
- Branch: British Army
- Service years: 1893–1938
- Rank: General
- Commands: 2 Bn Black Watch; 44th (Home Counties) Division; Northern Ireland District; Palestine and Trans-Jordan
- Conflicts: Second Boer War; World War I Arab revolt in Palestine
- Awards: Knight Grand Cross of the Order of the Bath; Knight Grand Cross of the Order of St Michael and St George; Companion of the Order of the Indian Empire; Distinguished Service Order

Signature
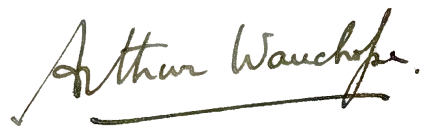

General Sir Arthur Grenfell Wauchope GCB GCMG CIE DSO (1 March 1874 – 14 September 1947) was a British Army officer and colonial administrator.

== Military career ==
Educated at Repton School, Wauchope was commissioned into the Argyll and Sutherland Highlanders in 1893. He transferred to the 2nd Battalion Black Watch in January 1896.

He served in the Second Boer War in South Africa from 1899, and took part in operations in Cape Colony, south of Orange River. British forces advancing north from the Cape to relieve the town of Kimberley, which was sieged by Boer forces, met heavy resistance in the Battle of Magersfontein on 11 December 1899. Wauchope was severely wounded in the battle, and was later mentioned in dispatches and appointed a Companion of the Distinguished Service Order (DSO) for his services.

In April 1902 he was seconded for a staff appointment, as an extra Aide de camp to Sir Walter Hely-Hutchinson, Governor and Commander-in-Chief of the Cape Colony.

He served in World War I, where he was promoted to major in September 1914, and later was commanding officer of the 2nd Bn Black Watch in France and Mesopotamia. On 11 May 1917 he was placed in command of a brigade. For the latter, he was appointed a Companion of the Order of the Indian Empire (CIE) in 1919.

After the War he joined 2nd Silesian Brigade, part of the British Upper Silesian Force, in Germany. He was promoted on 2 January 1923 to major general and became military member of an overseas delegation to Australia and New Zealand that same year, for which he was appointed Companion of the Order of the Bath (CB) in the 1923 Birthday Honours, and then Chief of the British Section of the Military Inter-Allied Commission of Control for Berlin in 1924. He relinquished this position in March 1927. He was appointed general officer commanding (GOC) of the 44th (Home Counties) Division, a Territorial Army (TA) formation, on 22 June 1927, taking over from Major General Henry Hodgson. He relinquished command of the division and was made GOC Northern Ireland District on 7 January 1929.

He was promoted to lieutenant general in May 1931 and appointed Knight Commander of the Order of the Bath (KCB) in August.

His last appointment was as high commissioner and commander-in-chief (C-in-C) for Palestine and Trans-Jordan in October 1931. He was promoted to general in April 1936.

Wauchope's administration was generally sympathetic to Zionist aspirations. By 1941 the former chief immigration officer for the Mandate, Albert Montefiore Hyamson, could write in his book Palestine: A Policy that "the first four years of his [Wauchope's] term were the heyday of Zionist history in Palestine." Not only did immigration go up threefold (the Jewish population increased from 174,606 to 329,358), but Jews also increased their land holdings (in 1931 they increased their land holdings by 18,585 dunams or 4,646 acres, while in 1935 they increased them by 72,905), and finally Jewish business and commerce enjoyed an economic boom. He also promoted public works and civil engineering schemes but was regarded as lax by some of his political colleagues at the early stages of the Arab rebellion. However, Wauchope oversaw mass detention throughout the revolt and sought to impose "collective punishment" on Palestinian cities and towns. This culminated in the June 1936 demolition of the Old City of Jaffa which rendered 6,000 Palestinians homeless. Wauchope was promoted to Knight Grand Cross of the Order of the Bath (GCB) on 1 January 1938 and retired later that year.

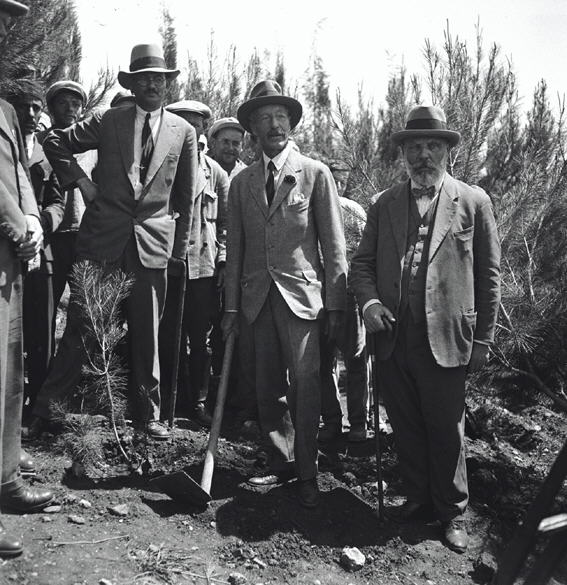
Wauchope with Menachem Ussishkin in Palestine, 1928

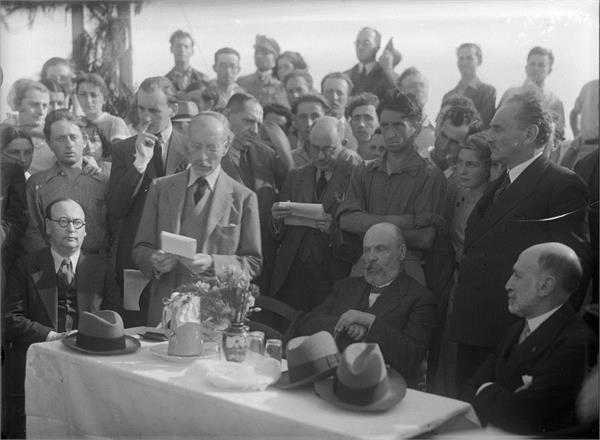
Wauchope speaking at Kfar HaHoresh 1936

He succeeded General Sir Archibald Cameron as colonel of the Black Watch in August 1940.

Military offices
| Preceded by Sir Henry Hodgson | GOC 44th (Home Counties) Division; 1927–1929 | Succeeded by Henry Peck |
| Preceded by Sir Felix Ready | General Officer Commanding the British Army in Northern Ireland; 1929–1931 | Succeeded by Eric Girdwood |
Government offices
| Preceded by Sir Mark Aitchison Young (acting) | High Commissioner of Palestine; High Commissioner for Trans-Jordan; 1932–1937 | Succeeded by William Denis Battershill (acting) |
