= List of Athenaeum Club members =

The following are known to be, or have been, members of the Athenaeum Club, London.

== Founders ==
- John Wilson Croker (1780–1857) (founder)
- James Burton (property developer) (1761–1837) (founder)
- Decimus Burton (1800–1881) (founder, designer of Clubhouse)
- Sir Humphry Davy (1778–1829) (founder, first chairman)
- Michael Faraday (1791–1867) (founder, first Secretary)
- Sir Thomas Lawrence (1769–1830) (designer of Club seal)
- Sir Francis Chantrey (1781–1841)
- Henry John Temple, 3rd Viscount Palmerston (1784–1865)

== Members ==
- Sir Lawrence Alma-Tadema (1836–1912)
- Richard Ansdell (1815–1885)
- Edward Armitage R.A. (1817–1896)
- Matthew Arnold (1822–1888)
- Thomas Arnold (1795–1842)
- Alexander Bain (1818–1903)
- Roger Bannister (1929–2018)
- David Barbour (1841– 1928)
- Sir Charles Barry (1795–1860)
- Gilbert Bayes (1872–1953)
- Robert Anning Bell (1863–1933)
- Jocelyn Bell Burnell (b. 1943)
- Philip Bliss (academic) (1787-1857)
- Edward Wilmot Blyden (1832-1912)
- Joseph Edgar Boehm Bart., R.A. (1834–1890)
- Louis Lucien Bonaparte (1813-1891)
- Sir Adrian Boult (1889–1983)
- John Brett (1831–1902)
- John Bright (1811–1889)
- Sir Thomas Brock, K.C.B., R.A. (1847–1922)
- Robert Browning (1812–1889)
- William Buckland (1784–1856)
- Sir Edward Bulwer-Lytton (1803–1873)
- John Burdon-Sanderson (1825–1925)
- William Burges (1827–1881)
- Sir Edward Burne-Jones (1833–1896)
- Philip Burne-Jones (1861–1926)
- Frederick Burton (1816–1900)
- Sir Richard Francis Burton (1821–1890)
- George Busk (1807–1886)
- William Butterfield (1814–1900)
- Arthur Buxton (1882–1958)
- George Campbell, 8th Duke of Argyll (1823–1900)
- George Canning (1770–1827)
- Thomas Carlyle (1795–1881)
- Robert Chambers (1802–1871)
- Sir Francis Chantrey R.A. (1781–1841)
- Arthur Hugh Clough (1819–1861)
- Alfred Clayton Cole (1854–1920)
- Edward Colebrooke, 1st Baron Colebrooke (1861-1939)
- John Collier (1850–1934)
- Charles Darwin (1809–1892)
- William Reid Dick (1879–1961)
- Charles Dickens (1812–1870)
- Thomas Frognall Dibdin (1776-1847)
- Benjamin Disraeli (1804–1881)
- Charles Dodgson (1800–1868)
- Arthur Conan Doyle (1859–1930)
- Richard Doyle (1824–1883)
- George du Maurier (1834–1896)
- Robinson Duckworth (1834-1911)
- Sir Alfred East (1849–1913)
- Griffith Edwards (1928–2012)
- Quentin Edwards (1925-2010)
- Edward Elgar (1857–1934)
- Thomas Faed (1826–1900)
- Sir Luke Fildes (1844–1927)
- John Henry Foley R.A. (1818–1874)
- Robert James Forbes (1900–1973)
- John Forster (1812–1876)
- Sir George Frampton R.A. (1860–1928)
- Edward Frankland (1825–1899)
- William Powell Frith (1819–1909)
- Sir Alfred Gilbert R.A. (1854–1934)
- Sir Francis Grant (1803–1878)
- Alec Guinness (1914–2000)
- H. Rider Haggard (1856-1925)
- George Hamilton-Gordon, 4th Earl of Aberdeen (1784–1860)
- James Duffield Harding (1797–1863)
- Philip Hardwick (1792–1870)
- Philip Charles Hardwick (1822–1892)
- Thomas Hardy (1840–1928)
- Augustus Hare (1834–1903)
- Thomas Archer Hirst (1830–1892)
- Joseph Dalton Hooker (1817–1911)
- Alfred William Hunt (1830–1896)
- William Holman Hunt (1827–1910)
- Noel Sydney Hush (1924-2019)
- Thomas Henry Huxley (1825–1895)
- John Rogers Herbert (1810–1890)
- Hubert von Herkomer (1849–1914)
- Washington Irving (1783–1859)
- Julian Jack (b. 1936)
- Henry James (1843–1916)
- PD James, author (1920-2014)
- Robert Banks Jenkinson, second Earl of Liverpool (1770–1828)
- William Goscombe John (1860–1952)
- Owen Jones (1809–1874)
- Thomas Jones (1870–1955)
- John Maynard Keynes (1883–1946)
- Rudyard Kipling (1865–1936)
- William Lamb, 2nd Viscount Melbourne (1779–1848)
- Sir Edwin Henry Landseer (1802–1873)
- Andrew Lang (1844–1912)
- Benjamin Williams Leader (1831–1923)
- Frederic Leighton, 1st Baron Leighton (1830–1896)
- John Frederick Lewis (1805–1876)
- John Lubbock, 1st Baron Avebury (1834–1913)
- Sir Charles Lyell (1797–1875)
- Thomas Babington Macaulay (1800–1859)
- Daniel Maclise (1806–1870)
- Frederic Madden (1801-1873)
- Henry Edward Cardinal Manning (1807–1892)
- Gideon Mantell (1790–1852)
- Frederick Maurice (1805–1872)
- James Clerk Maxwell (1831–1879)
- Theresa May (b. 1956)
- Philip May (b. 1957)
- Henry Melvill (1798–1871)
- Yehudi Menuhin (1916–1999)
- Diane Middlebrook (1939–2007)
- John Stuart Mill (1806–1873)
- Sir John Everett Millais (1829–1896)
- Henry Hart Milman (1791–1868)
- Leonard G. Montefiore (1889–1961)
- Patrick Moore (1923–2012)
- William Mulready R.A. (1786–1863)
- John Nash (1752–1835)
- Richard Owen (1804–1892)
- Robert Peel (1788–1850)
- Henry Alfred Pegram (1862–1937)
- John Percy FRS (1817–1889)
- Cooper Perry (1856–1938)
- St John Philby (1885–1960)
- Thomas Jodrell Phillips Jodrell (1807–1897)
- Thomas Phillipps (1792-1872)
- Edward Poynter R.A. (1821–1902)
- Valentine Cameron Prinsep (1838–1904)
- Richard Redgrave (1804–1888)
- Ralph Richardson (1902–1983)
- George Richmond (1809–1896)
- Sir William Blake Richmond (1842–1921)
- David Roberts (1796–1864)
- Samuel Rogers (1763–1855)
- John Ruskin (1819–1900)
- Lord John Russell (1792–1878)
- Ernest Rutherford (1871-1937)
- Owen Rutter (1889–1944)
- John Charles Ryle (1816–1900)
- Archibald Sayce (1845-1933)
- Jimmy Savile (1926–2011)
- John Liston Byam Shaw (1872–1919)
- Richard Norman Shaw (1831–1912)
- Sir Martin Archer Shee P.R.A. (1769–1850)
- John H. Smythe (1844–1908)
- Edward Smith-Stanley, 13th Earl of Derby (1775–1851)
- Solomon J. Solomon (1860–1927)
- William Somerville (1771–1860)
- Herbert Spencer (1820–1903)
- Charles Villiers Stanford (1852–1924)
- Clarkson Stanfield (1793–1867)
- Leslie Stephen (1832–1904)
- Robert Louis Stevenson (1850–1894)
- Rory Stewart (b. 1973)
- George Edmund Street (1824–1881)
- Arthur Sullivan (1842–1900)
- John Addington Symonds (1807–1871)
- Archibald Campbell Tait, Archbishop of Canterbury (1811–1882)
- Frederick Temple, Archbishop of Canterbury (1821–1903)
- Henry John Temple, Viscount Palmerston (1784–1865)
- Hallam Tennyson, 2nd Baron Tennyson (1809–1892)
- William Makepeace Thackeray (1811–1863)
- William Turner Thiselton-Dyer
- Joseph John Thomson (1856-1940)
- Simon Thompson (b. 1959)
- William Hamo Thornycroft R. A. (1850–1925)
- Rick Trainor (b. 1948)
- Anthony Trollope (1815–1882)
- Joseph Mallord William Turner R.A. (1775–1851)
- John Tyndall (1820–1893)
- Henry Vaughan (1809-1899)
- Gore Vidal (1925–2012)
- William Walton (1902–1983)
- John William Waterhouse (1849–1917)
- George Frederic Watts (1817–1904)
- Arthur Wellesley, 1st Duke of Wellington (1769–1852)
- Sir Richard Westmacott, Junior RA (1775–1856)
- William Whewell (1794–1866)
- Samuel Wilberforce, Bishop of Oxford (1805–1873)
- William Wilberforce (1759–1833)
- Harold Wilberforce-Bell (1885 – 1956)
- Thomas Woolner R.A. (1825–1892)

== Sources ==
- Ward, Humphry (1926). History of the Athenaeum 1824–1925. London.
- Cowell, Frank Richard (1975). The Athenaeum: Club and Social Life in London, 1824–1974. London: Heinemann. ISBN 0-435-32010-6.
