= Passfield White Paper =

Map of the British Mandate of Palestine

The Passfield White Paper, issued 20 October 1930, by colonial secretary Lord Passfield (Sidney Webb), was a formal statement of British policy in Palestine, which previously had been set by the Churchill White Paper of 1922. The new statement resulted from the Hope Simpson Commission's investigation into the deeper causes of the 1929 Palestine riots, that initially started over access to the Western Wall. The white paper limited official Jewish immigration to a much greater degree.

== Backround ==
The British Mandate of Palestine was established in 1920 at the San Remo conference following World War 1, in which the Allied Powers were to decide the fate of formerly Ottoman territories. Under the league of nations mandate, the land and people of Palestine were to be administered by the British empire until future notice. Prior to the establishment of the mandate, Britain had made conflicting promises to both the Jews and Arabs living in Palestine regarding a homeland in the middle of the first World War. In 1917, the Balfour declaration was established by the British Foreign Secretary, Arthur James Balfour, which promised the Jews a homeland in Palestine. The McMahon Hussein correspondence contrasts this promise entirely, as the Arabs were also promised an independent Arab state in exchange for defeating the Ottomans in the war in 1916. In addition to these dual obligations, in the 1920s and 1930s, British policy facilitated increased Jewish immigration and land purchases in Palestine.

Under growing fears and tensions of losing their homeland, the Arab people began to riot across Palestine. These riots prompted Britain to examine the causes of this violence and attempt to reestablish order in the mandate. The Shaw Commission, appointed by the British, revealed the violent riots were triggered by economic grievances, fears, national aspirations, and racial animosity. This led directly to another investigation, The Hope-Simpson report, that concluded change in policy was necessary. As a result of these investigations and their findings, the British changed their policy once again and established the 1930 Passfield White Paper.

== Main Provisions ==
The Passfield White Paper introduced various provisions detailing immigration control and land allocation. It details that there is no longer enough cultivable land or used land available for settlement, even for the Arab population themselves, therefore limiting land for Jewish immigration in the future. The paper outlines that many Arab fellahs are vulnerable and landless, so there must be safeguards in place for their protection. It provides the British government with the authority in their mandate to reduce or suspend Jewish immigration if it unfavorably affects the general labour population, which many Arabs argued that increased Jewish immigration did. The paper considered some Zionist settlement and labour institutons as incongruent with article 6 of the mandate, including the Histadrut (General Federation of Labor) and the Jewish Agency, which both promoted Jewish employment of only Jewish labor, thereby supporting the ejection of Palestinians from purchased land, most who previously worked under a tenant farming system. Like the Hope Simpson Report, the Passfield White Paper found this Zionist policy damaging to the economic development of the Arab population. It concluded that Jewish immigration to Palestine was taking land from the Arab fellahs; sales of land to Jewish settlers should in future be restricted, and Arab unemployment levels should be a factor in considering permitted levels of Jewish immigration to Palestine.

Establishment of a legislative council is additionally detailed in the document to facilitate better Arab Jewish relations and provide an initiative for self-government. The document reinforces British authority as a mandate that will continue to provide order and military oversight, while limiting immigration and land policy.

== Reactions and Results ==
Zionists claimed it backtracked from what they felt were commitments in the Balfour Declaration and, if implemented, would limit Jewish immigration to Palestine. Contrary to these claims, the White Paper states that the development of a Jewish National Home in Palestine is a consideration, which would enjoy continued support, but it was not central to mandate governance. The paper states that the British intend to fulfill their mandate obligations to both Palestinian Arabs and Jews, and they would resolve any conflicts that might surface as a result of their respective needs.

Zionist organizations worldwide mounted a vigorous campaign against the document. Additionally, not only did Zionist activists lobby against the paper, but British political actors in pro-Zionist organizations and opposition groups were critical. Palestine was not simply a colonial discussion but a domestic political issue that divided British politics in the conservative, liberal, and labour parties respectively. A parliamentary debate was held in Britain in November of 1930 after the Passfield papers' publication where negotiations and a subsequent reversal were discussed. This led to British prime minister Ramsay MacDonald's clarification of the white paper in front of the British House of Commons and in a letter to Chaim Weizmann in 1931 known as the MacDonald letter. The Macdonald letter reaffirmed that Jewish immigration would continue, weakening the previous provisions of decreased immigration and better protections for Arab farmers.

The MacDonald Letter aimed to placate the Zionists while disturbing the Palestinians as little as possible. When many Zionists took the letter as a withdrawal of the white paper, it became labelled the 'black letter' by Palestinians. The Arab people believed Britain was abandoning the necessary protections for Arab cultivators. This was despite the fact that Prime Minister said in parliament on 11 February 1931 that he was "very unwilling to give the letter the same status as the dominating document" i.e. the Passfield White Paper. The letter itself also stated that it aimed to provide justice to "non-Jewish sections of the community". By confirming that the policy of the Palestine Mandate was to continue to support Jewish immigration, the Letter in effect negated some of the implications of the White Paper and facilitated increasing immigration during the rise of antisemitism in Europe in the 1930s.

== See also ==
- Peel Commission, 1937

== Bibliography ==
- Hyamson, Albert Montefiore, Palestine: A Policy. Methuen, 1942
- Shapira, Anita (2014). Ben-Gurion - Father of Modern Israel. Nerw Haven and London: Yale University Press. ISBN 9780300180459.
- Jewish Virtual Library: Passfield White Paper
