= Felicity Askew =

British sculptor born 1894

Felicity Katherine Sarah Askew (born 19 December 1894) was a British artist, notable for her paintings and sculptures of horses.

== Biography ==
Askew was born at Chelsea in London to John Bertram Askew and Frederica Louisa née Dallas. Her grandfather was George Dallas. She studied under William Frank Calderon, Max Kruse and Ernesto Bazzaro. Askew established herself as a painter and sculptor in bronze. Her sculptures were of equestrian and sporting subjects. She exhibited works in London, at the Walker Art Gallery in Liverpool and in Paris, including at the Salon des Artistes Francais in 1926. She also exhibited works in Germany, Italy and the United States. Her best known work is Companions of Labour, a bronze group of horses dating from 1926. For many years Askew lived in Newmarket in Suffolk and later, in the 1920s, at Berwick upon Tweed. From Berwick, she exhibited at a number of galleries in the north-east of England and Scotland.

It appears as if she gave up on her artistic career to take up acting in the 1950s.
