= Djelloul Khatib =

Algerian combatant and public servant

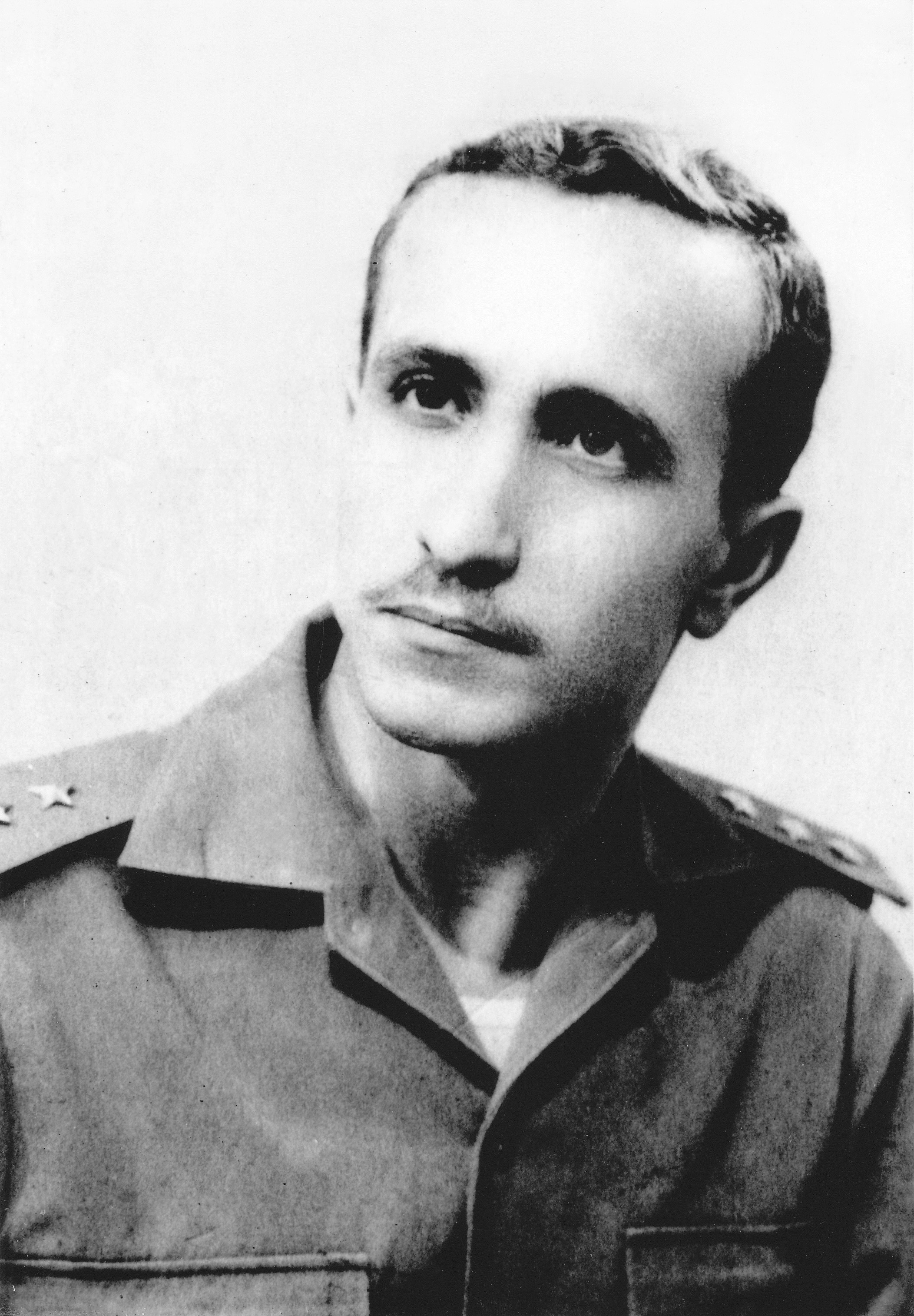
- Khatib in 1962

Chief of Staff of the Ministry of Defence
- In office 27 September 1962 – 19 June 1965
- Preceded by: Position established
- Succeeded by: Colonel Abdelkader Chabou

Chief of Staff of the President of the Republic
- In office 19 June 1965 – 14 October 1970
- Preceded by: Position established
- Succeeded by: Doctor Amir Benaïssa

Governor of Batna
- In office 1973–1976

Governor of Constantine
- In office 1976 – 30 November 1980
- Preceded by: Amal Akbi
- Succeeded by: Chaabane Ait-Abderrahim

Governor of Oran
- In office 1 December 1980 – 11 January 1982
- Succeeded by: Mohamed Rachid Merazi

Secretary of State in Charge of the Civil Service
- In office 12 January 1982 – 22 January 1983
- Preceded by: Position established

Ambassador to Argentina
- In office 23 January 1984 – 1 January 1988

Ambassador to Spain
- In office 2 January 1988 – 20 September 1989

Personal details
- Born: Djelloul Khatib; 8 October 1936 Algiers, Algeria
- Died: 6 February 2017 (aged 80)
- Party: National Liberation Front

Military service
- Branch/service: Armée de Libération Nationale (ALN); People's National Army (PNP)
- Years of service: 1956–1962 (ALN); 1962–1965 (PNP)
- Rank: Commandant
- Battles/wars: Battle of Algiers (1956–57); Suez Crisis; Algerian war of independence
- Awards: Ordre du merite national Orden del libertador San Martín

Djelloul Khatib, alias Commandant Djelloul (8 October 1936 – 6 February 2017) was a combatant for the Algerian independence and a public servant. During the war of independence he led the efforts towards the professionalization of the National Liberation Army (NLA). He contributed thereafter to building the civil service of newly independent Algeria.

== War of Independence ==
Djelloul Khatib hails from the Casbah of Algiers. In 1956 he participated as a young freedom fighter to the battle of Algiers. He was then transferred to Egypt by the National Liberation Army (NLA) to attend military school. The Suez Crisis broke out just as he reported for duty in Cairo; he was mobilized and participated to the combats in Port-Said.

He was assigned thereafter to the NLA Eastern base along the Algeria-Tunisian border and was promoted to the rank of officer. He then joined the First Supply Company which was tasked with channeling arms and ammunition from the Tunisian border to the mountainous region of Kabylia where the fighting was particularly intense.

Djelloul Khatib Together With Other Young Officers of the National Liberation Army, Circa 1957-1958

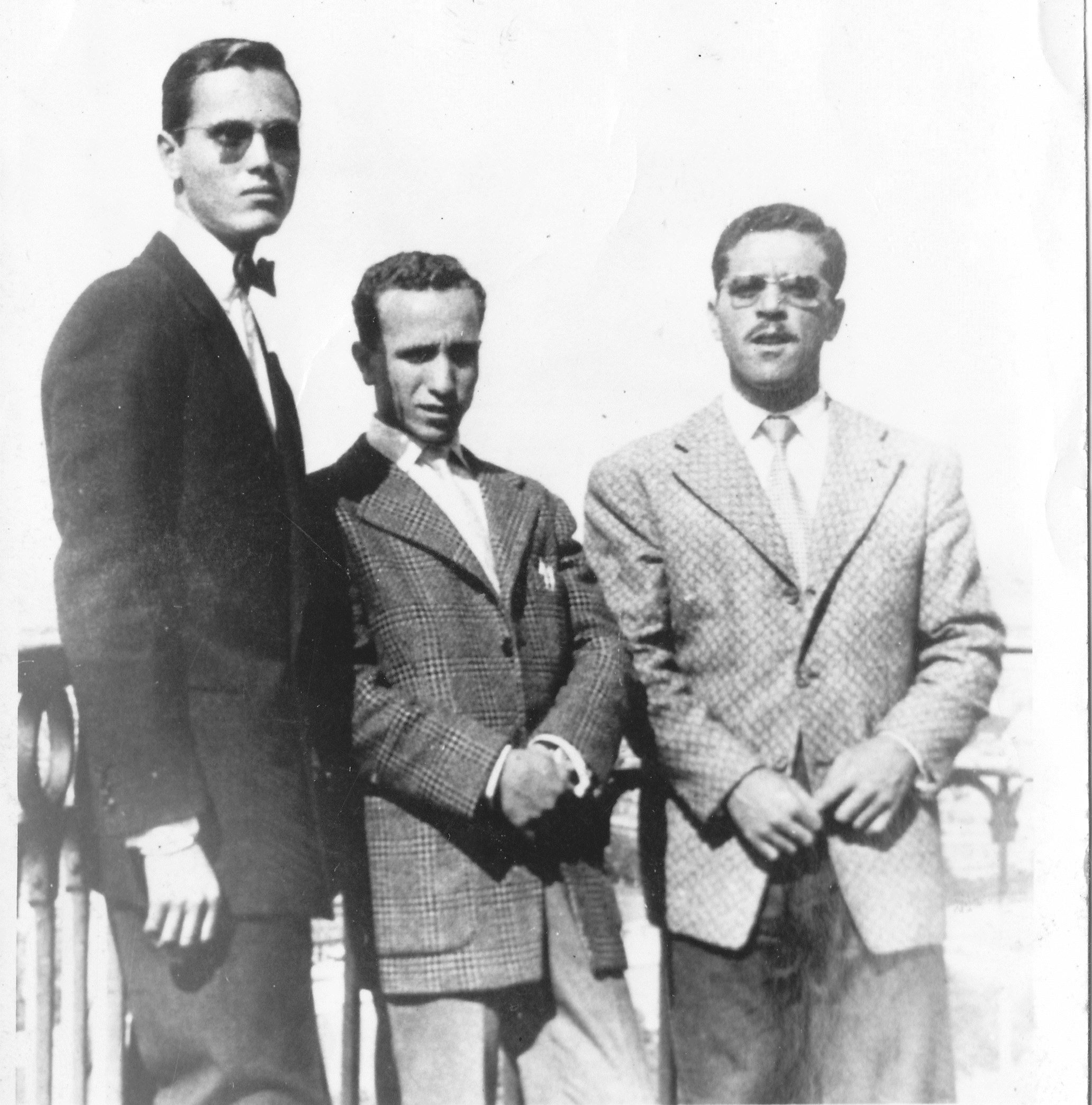
Mohamed Chebila, Djelloul Khatib and Mouloud Khatib (who died in combat with Col. Amirouche en 1959), Tunis 1957

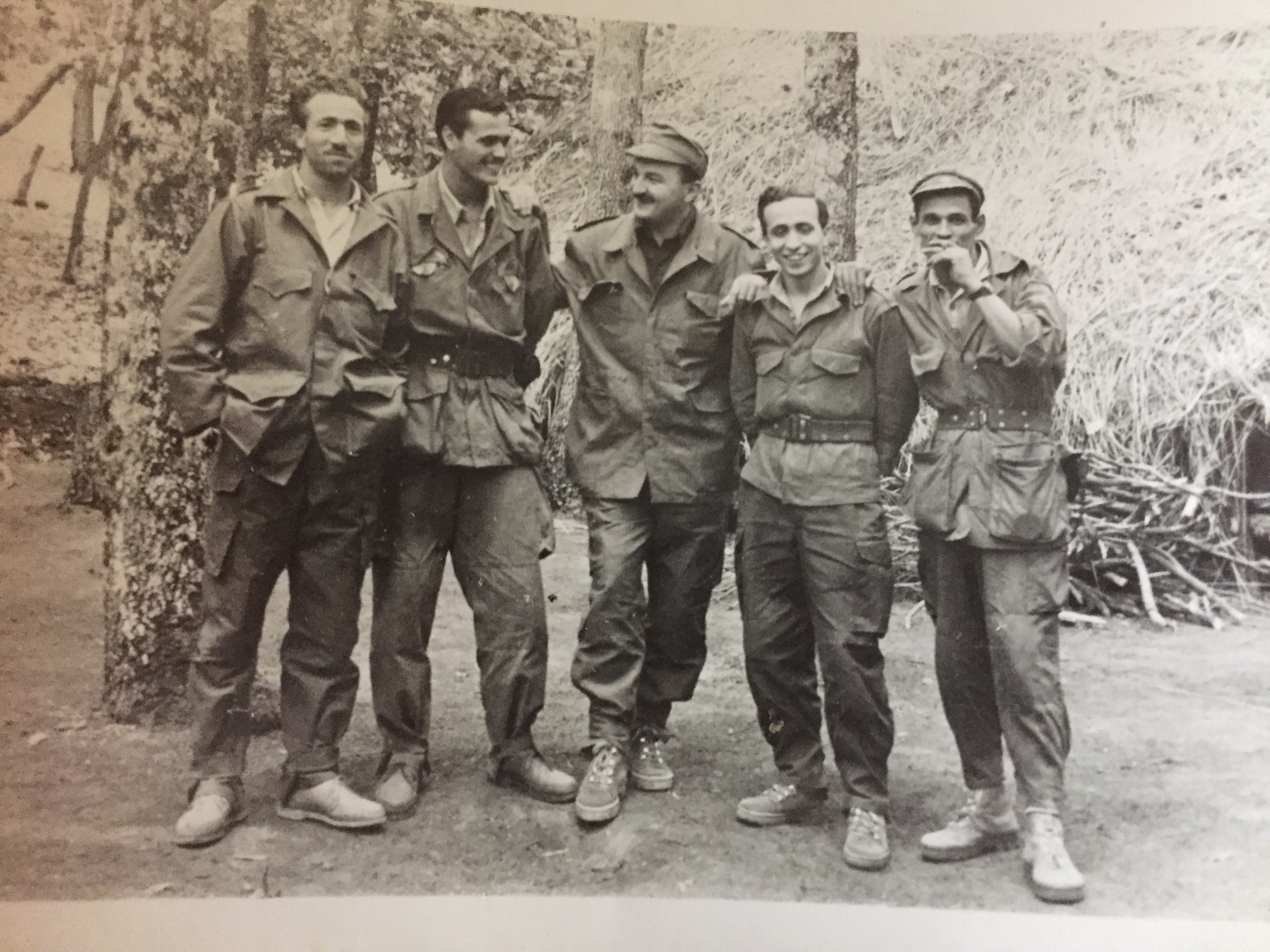
Command Center of the 2nd Battalion, Eastern Base, Circa 1957-58, Tahar Zbiri, Mohamed Chebila, Aek Laribi, Djelloul Khatib and Said "Indochine"

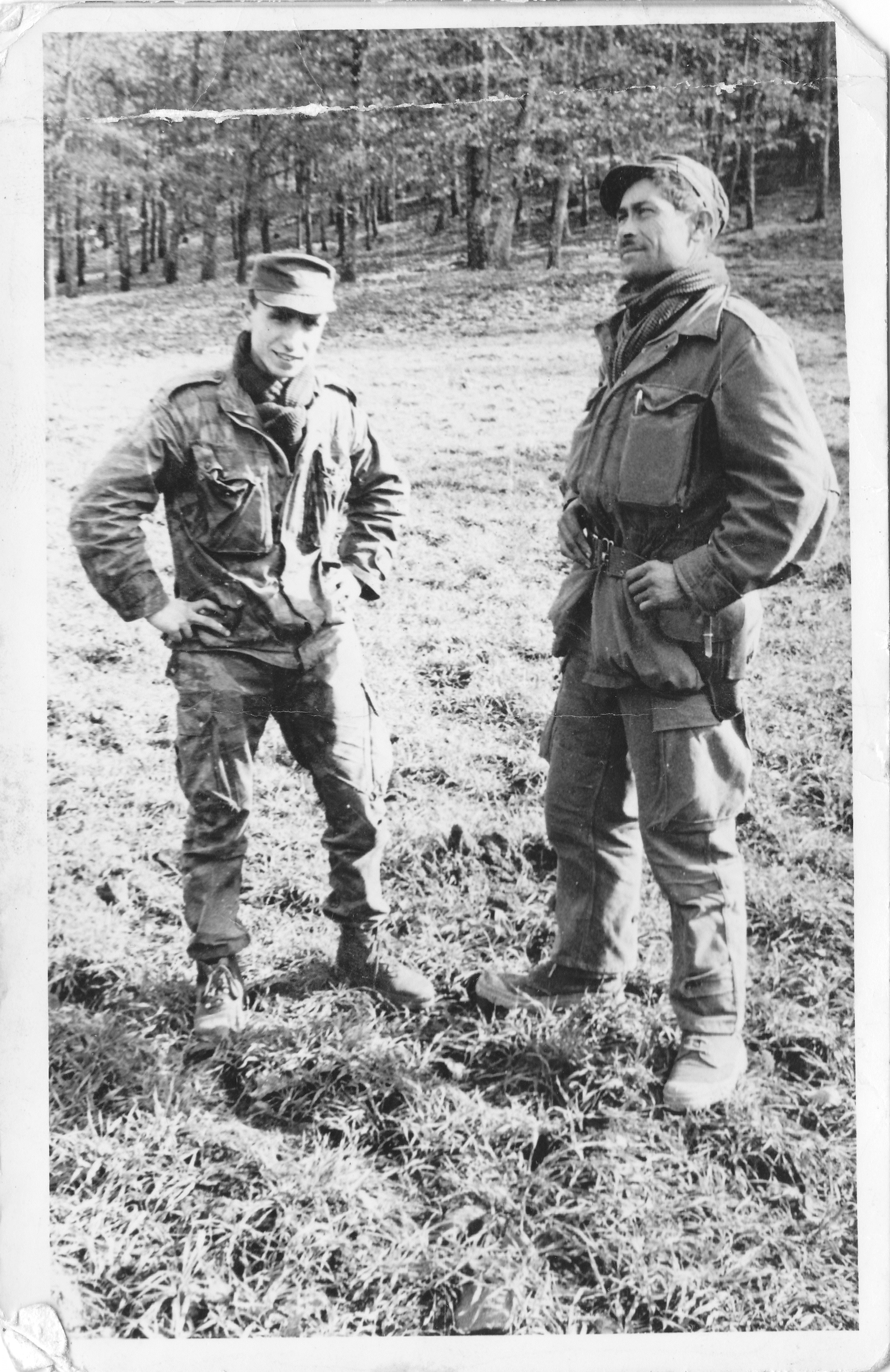
Djelloul Khatib and Taib "rafale", Eastern Base 1957

During his back and forth crossing the morice line he acted as liaison officer between the NLA general staff and the combat units of the Aures region (also called Wilaya I) and Kabylia (Wilaya III). One of his initial missions was to link with Colonel Amirouche, considered a hero of the independence war. As part of the efforts to increase the international visibility of the struggle for independence, Khatib helped in securing the transfer of media reporters from the Tunisian border to the combat units of the interior. In particular he worked with BBC reporter and Oxford scholar Nevill Barbour, with Stevan Labudovic from the Yugoslav media agency Filmske Novosti, with German war photographer Dirk Alvermann and with Italian journalist from the Europeo Magazine, Nino Pulejo. He also helped building up, together with other young officers, the LNA radio communication team.

Crossing of the Morice Line

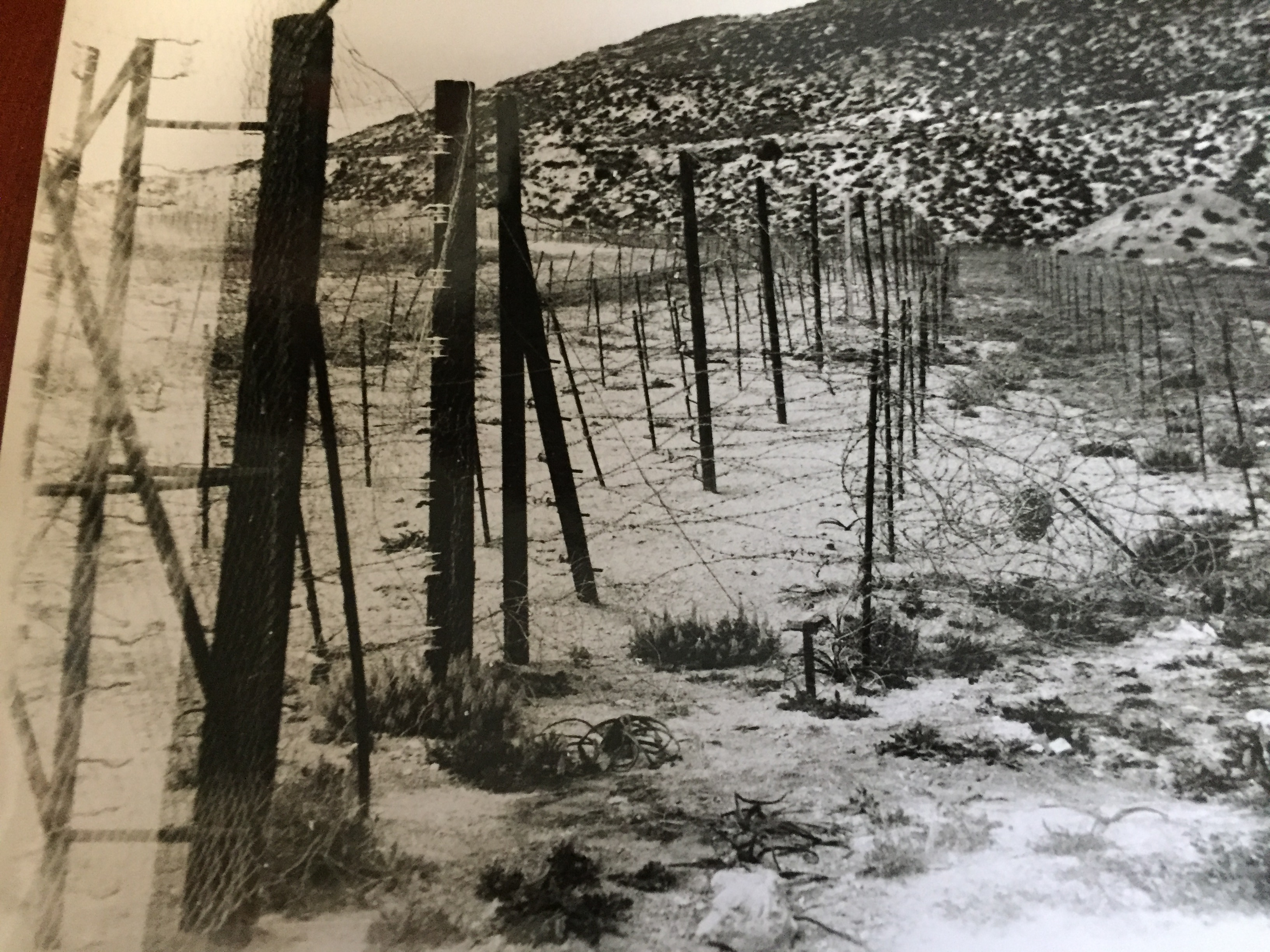
Morice Line, Circa 1958-1959

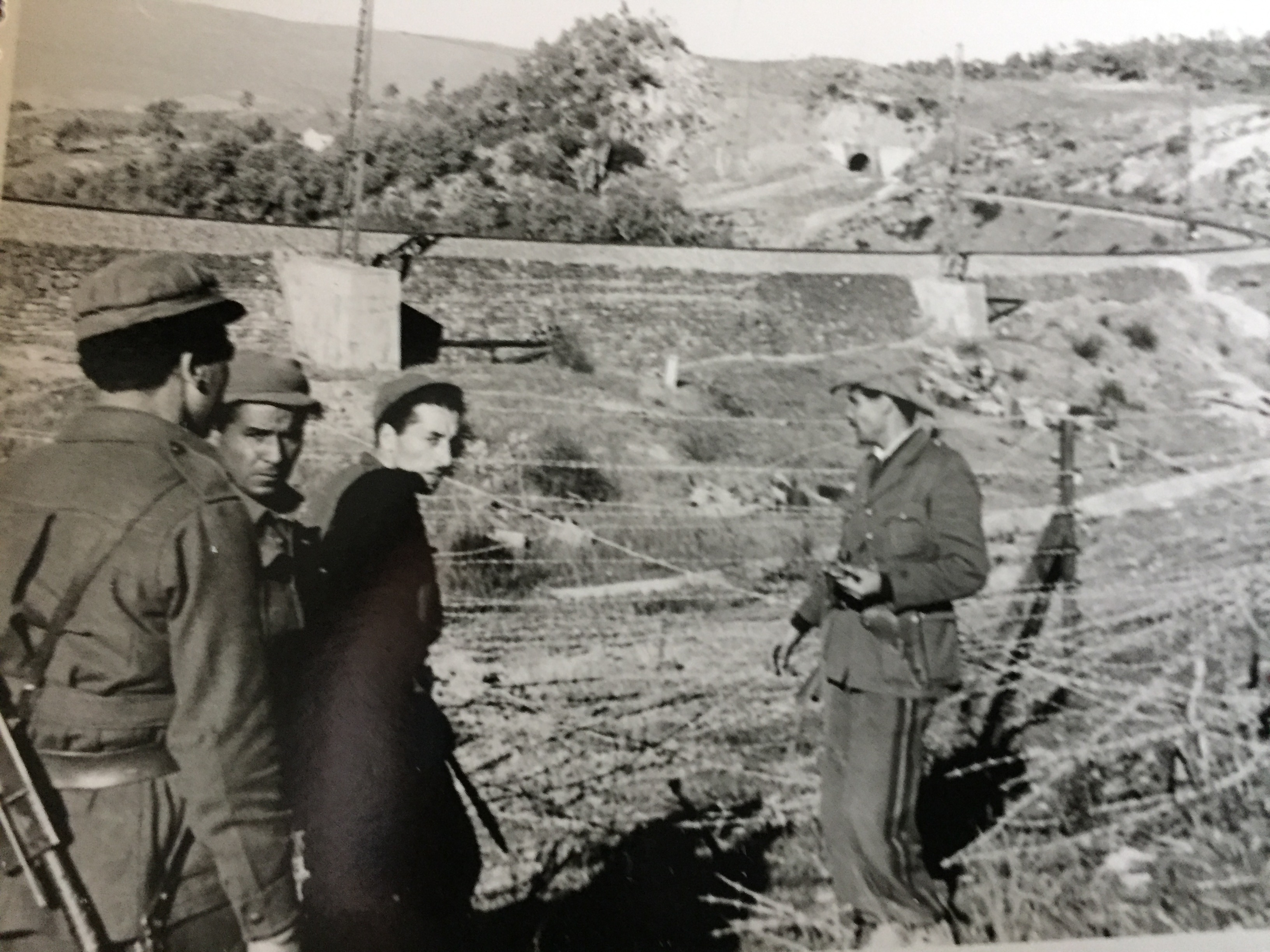
An NLA Team inspects the Morice Line by the Ouenza railway track. Circa 1958-59. The photo features Abderrahmane Bensalem, one of the senior commander of the Eastern Base.

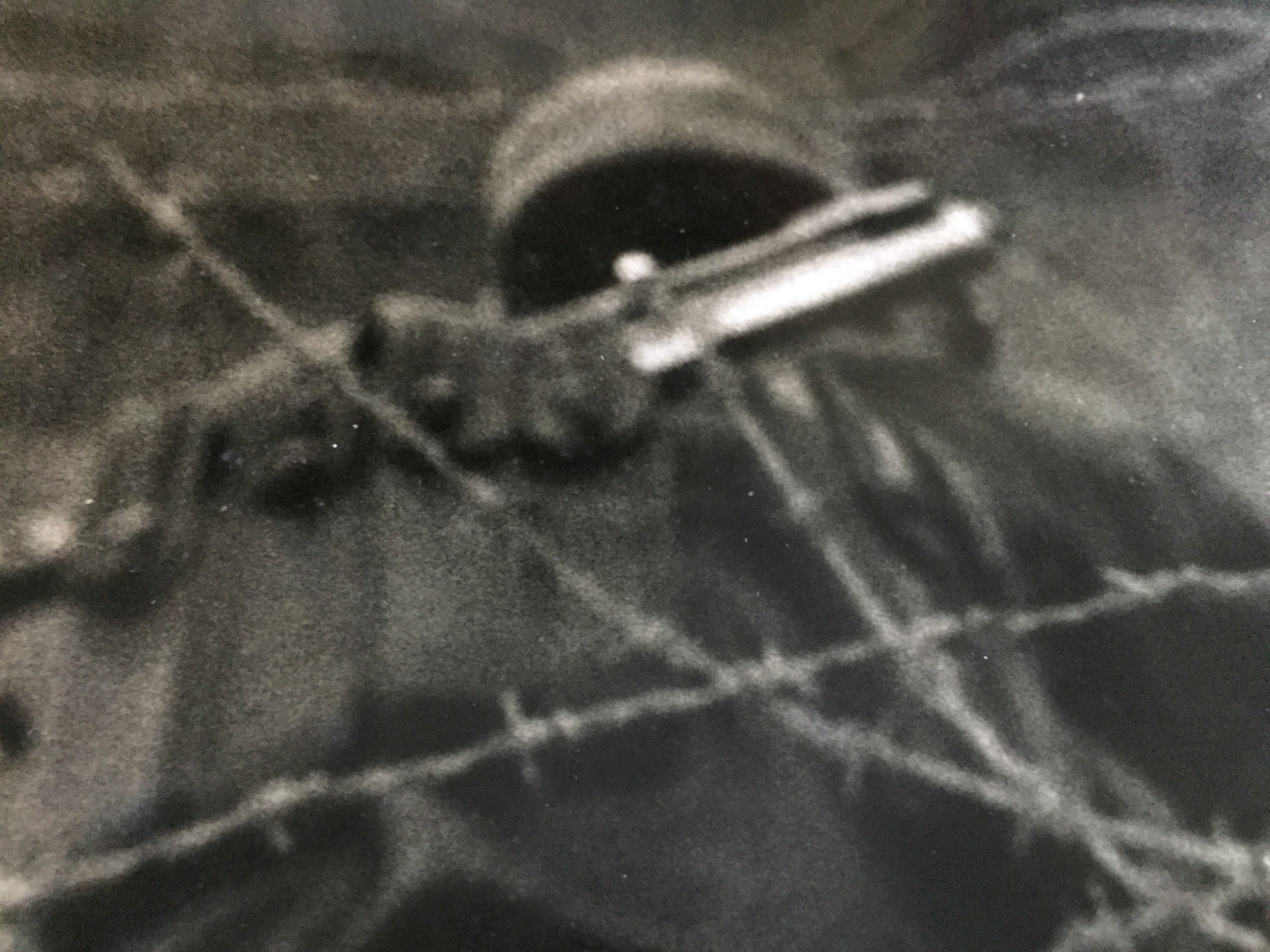
NLA soldier crosses the Morice Line
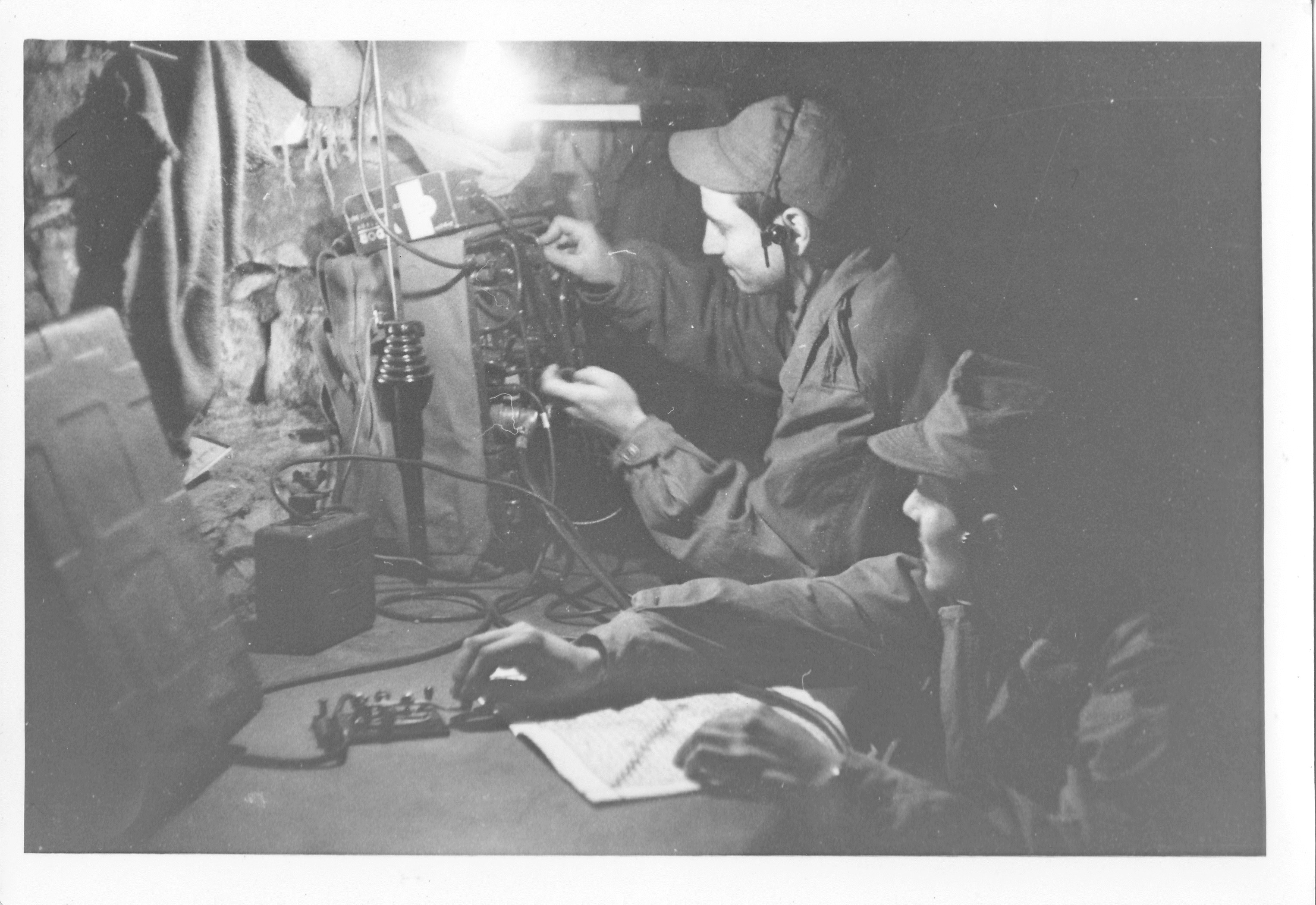
Transmission group, National Liberation Army, Eastern Base, 1957

By 1958 Djelloul Khatib was named Secretary General of the NLA’S Northern Zone Staff and subsequently of the NLA General Staff, under the direct command of Houari Boumediene. During the remaining years of war he led, together with other fellow officers such as Abdelkader Chabou and Slimane Hoffman, the efforts to professionalize the Liberation Army and to strengthen the support bases required to maintain the struggle for independence. He became during these years a close advisor to Boumediene.

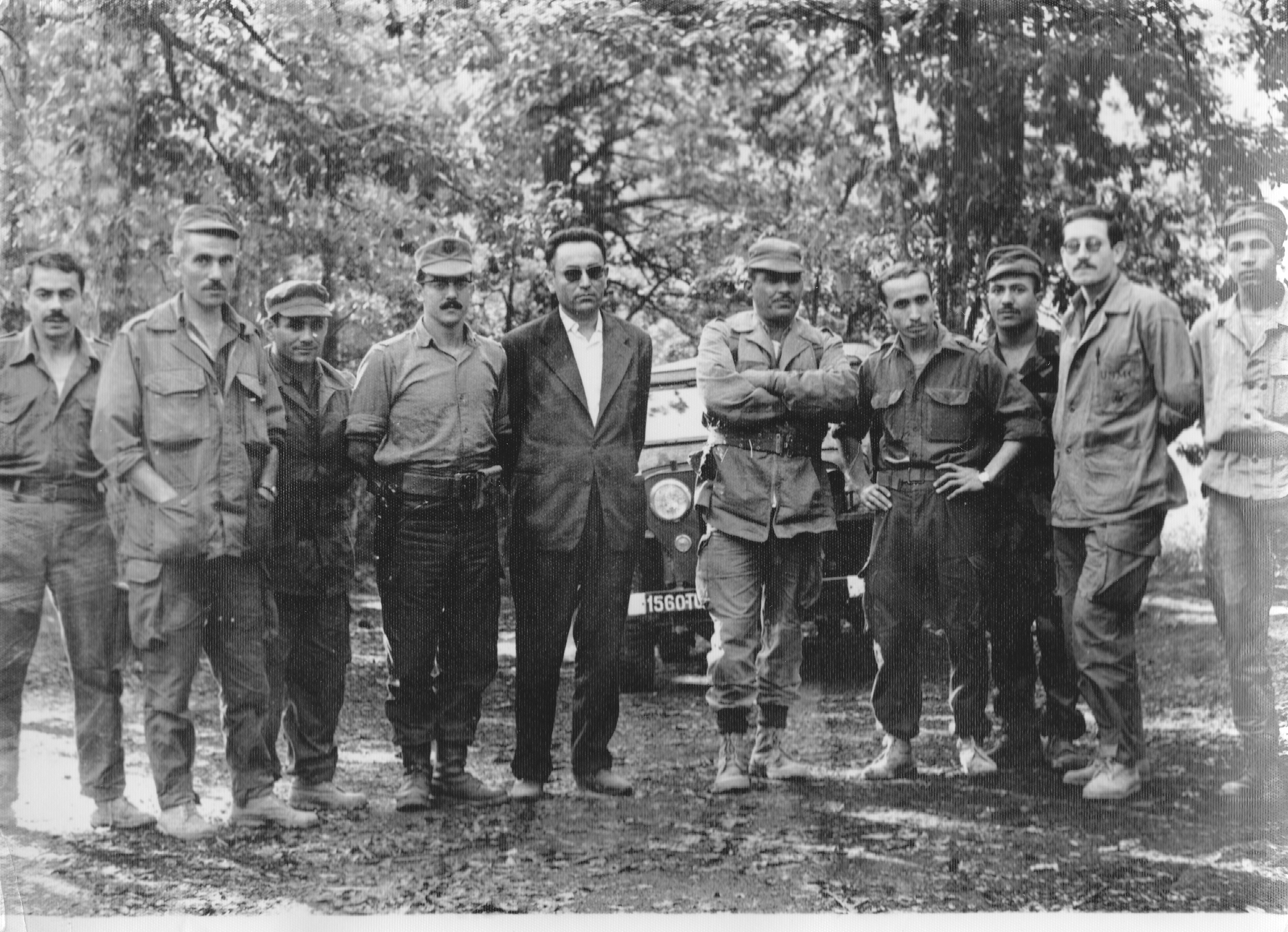
Chadli Bendjedid, Mohamed Abdelghani, Benyoucef Benkhedda, Abderrahmane Bensalem and Djelloul Khatib, General Staff (Etat Major Général), border between Algeria and Tunisia, 1961

== Politics ==
=== Chief of Staff of the Ministry of Defense and of the Presidency ===
Once Algerian independence was achieved, Khatib at the age of 26, was appointed as Chief of Staff of the Ministry of Defence (1962-1965) and then Chief of Staff of the Presidency (1965-1970). He was tasked by Boumediene, then President of the country, to drive a number of defining initiatives of his administration.

Djelloul Khatib set up the Comedor, a think tank in charge of developing the urban planning of the capital city of Algiers and to which contributed world renowned architects such as Oscar Niemeyer. Khatib also organized the transfer back to the homeland of the ashes of the Emir Abdelkader, an early leader against France colonial invasion in the mid-19th century who died in exile in Damascus.

Khatib also managed the negotiations that led to the signature of the Franco-Algerian agreement of 1968 – which regulates, until now, much of the administrative links between both countries.

He was one of the decision makers that made possible the success of the Algiers panafrican festival of 1969. Khatib was also tasked by President Boumediene to organize the visits to Algiers of personalities such as the Che Gueverra or Senator Edward Kennedy. The meeting with the latter helped prepare the ground for a longstanding partnership between the United States and Algeria in the Hydrocarbons sector.

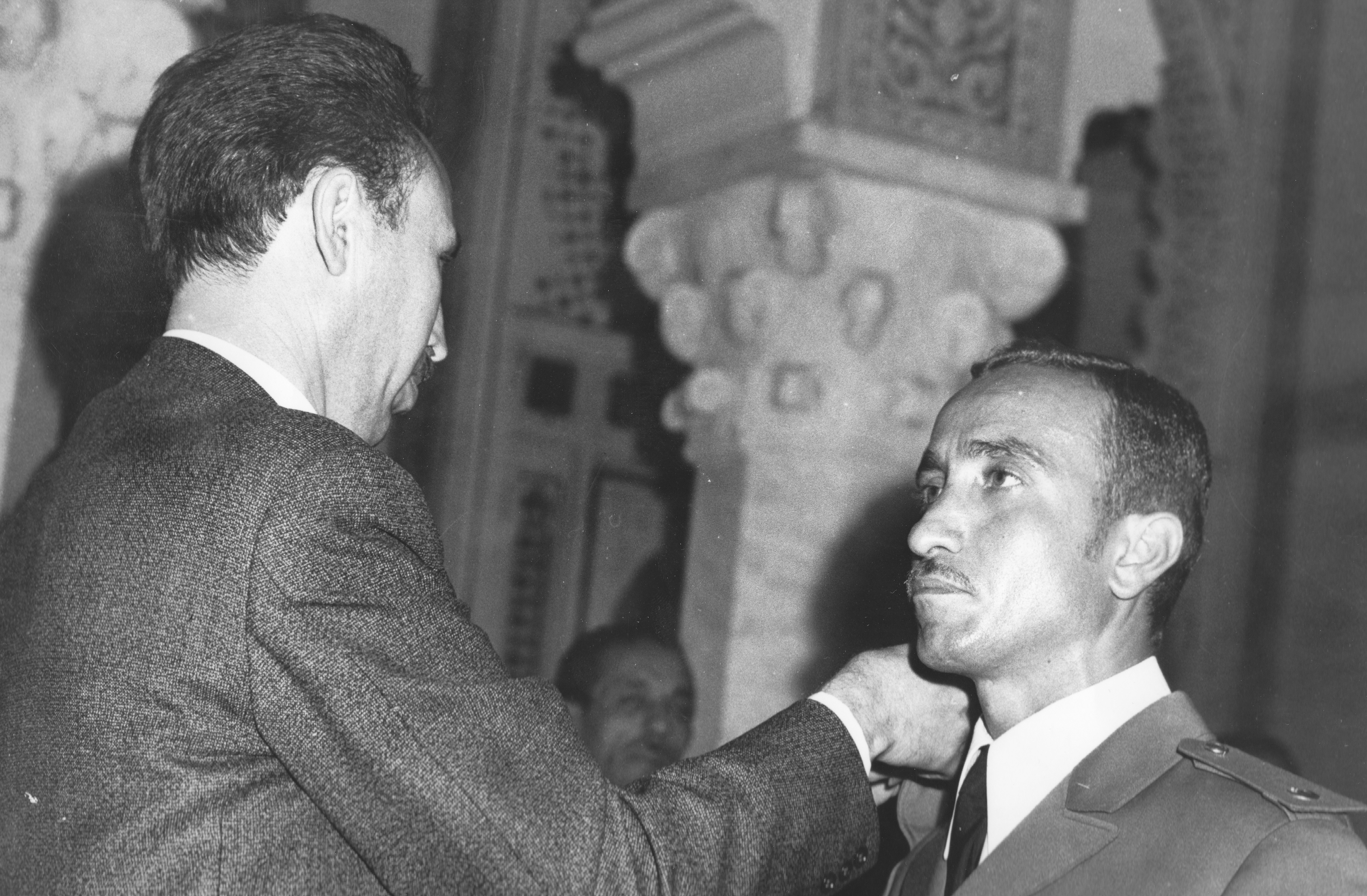
President Boumedienne condecorates Djelloul Khatib, 1965, Algiers

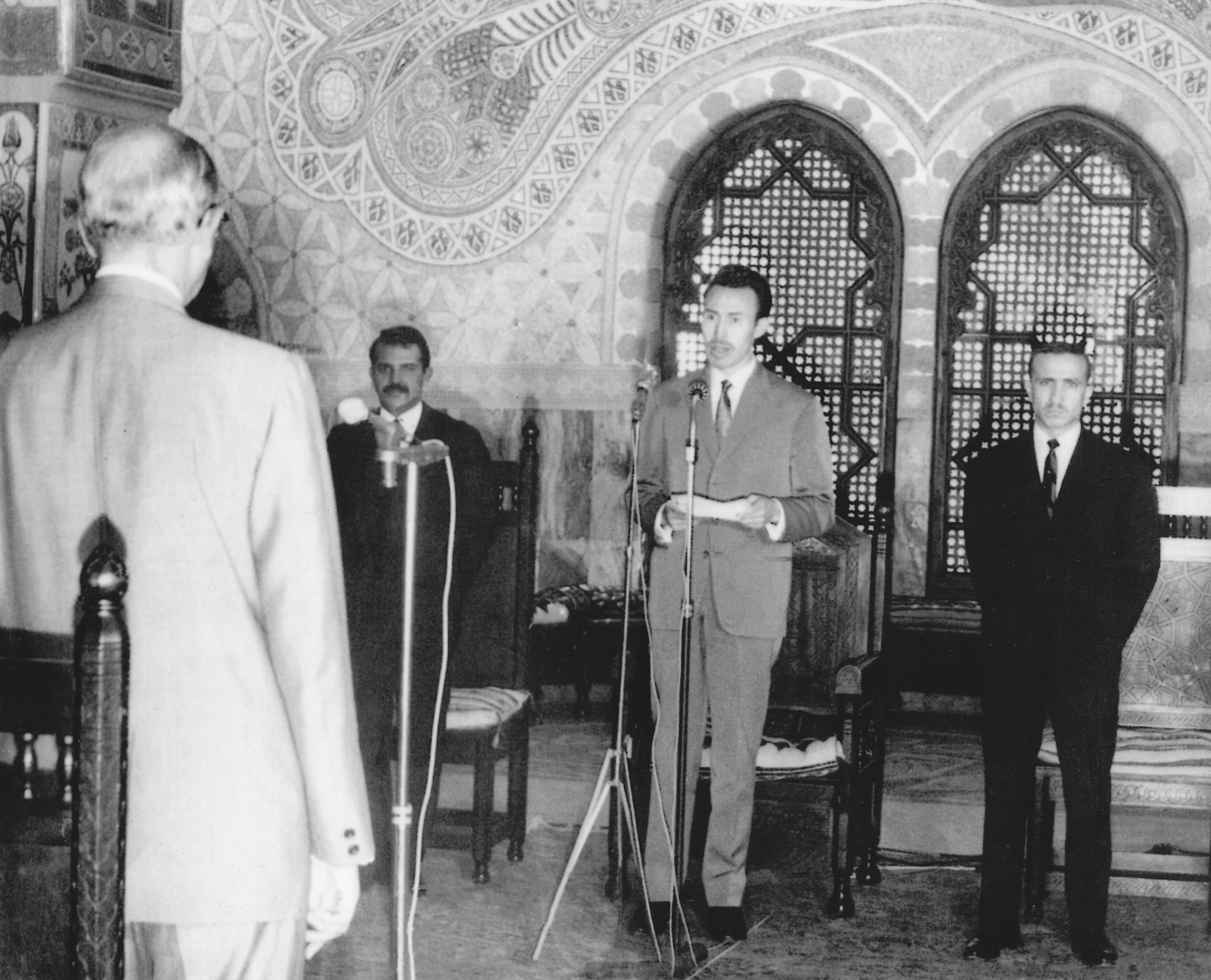
President Houari Boumediene, Foreign Minister Abdelaziz Bouteflika and Chief of Staff Djelloul Khatib, presentation of diplomatic credentials by the Ambassador of the United States, Palais du Peuple, Algiers, 1967

=== Oscar Niemeyer ===
As head of the Comedor, Khatib worked intensely with Oscar Niemeyer. This collaboration made possible the construction of a number of high-profile architectural projects such as the first university since the independence of Algeria in Constantine. Other projects resulting from this cooperation are today, even if not executed, an essential part of Oscar Niemeyer's legacy (Algiers mosque, Algiers Civic Center).

=== Governor ===
Khatib was appointed Wali (Governor) of Batna (1973-1976), Constantine – the third largest city of the country (1976-1980) and Oran – the second largest city of the country (1980-1982).

=== Secretary of State in Charge of the Civil Service ===
He was named Secretary of State in charge of the Civil Service (1982-1984). During his tenure, he was charged by Prime Minister Abdelghani to coordinate the visit of George H. W. Bush in 1983, the first one of a Vice-President of the United States to Algeria.

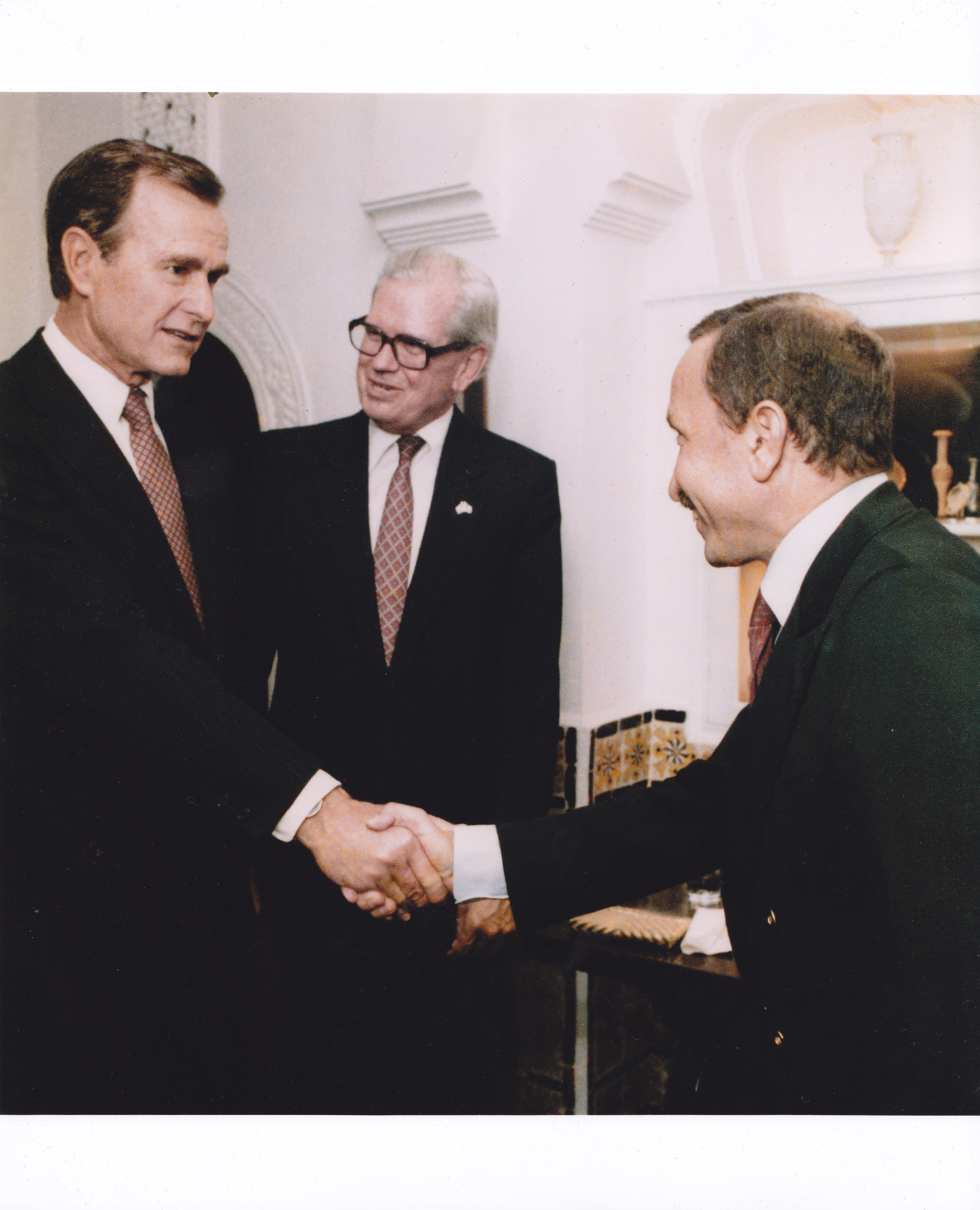
Vice President George H.W. Bush and Djelloul Khatib, Algiers, 1983

=== Ambassador ===
Djelloul Khatib was then appointed Ambassador to Argentina (1982-1984). He intensified economic and technical collaboration between both countries, particularly in civil nuclear power. These efforts led by 1989 to the construction in Algeria of the NOUR nuclear research reactor. As a mark of gratitude for strengthening the ties between Argentina and Algeria, President Raul Alfonsin, awarded him with the "es:Orden del Libertador San Martín".

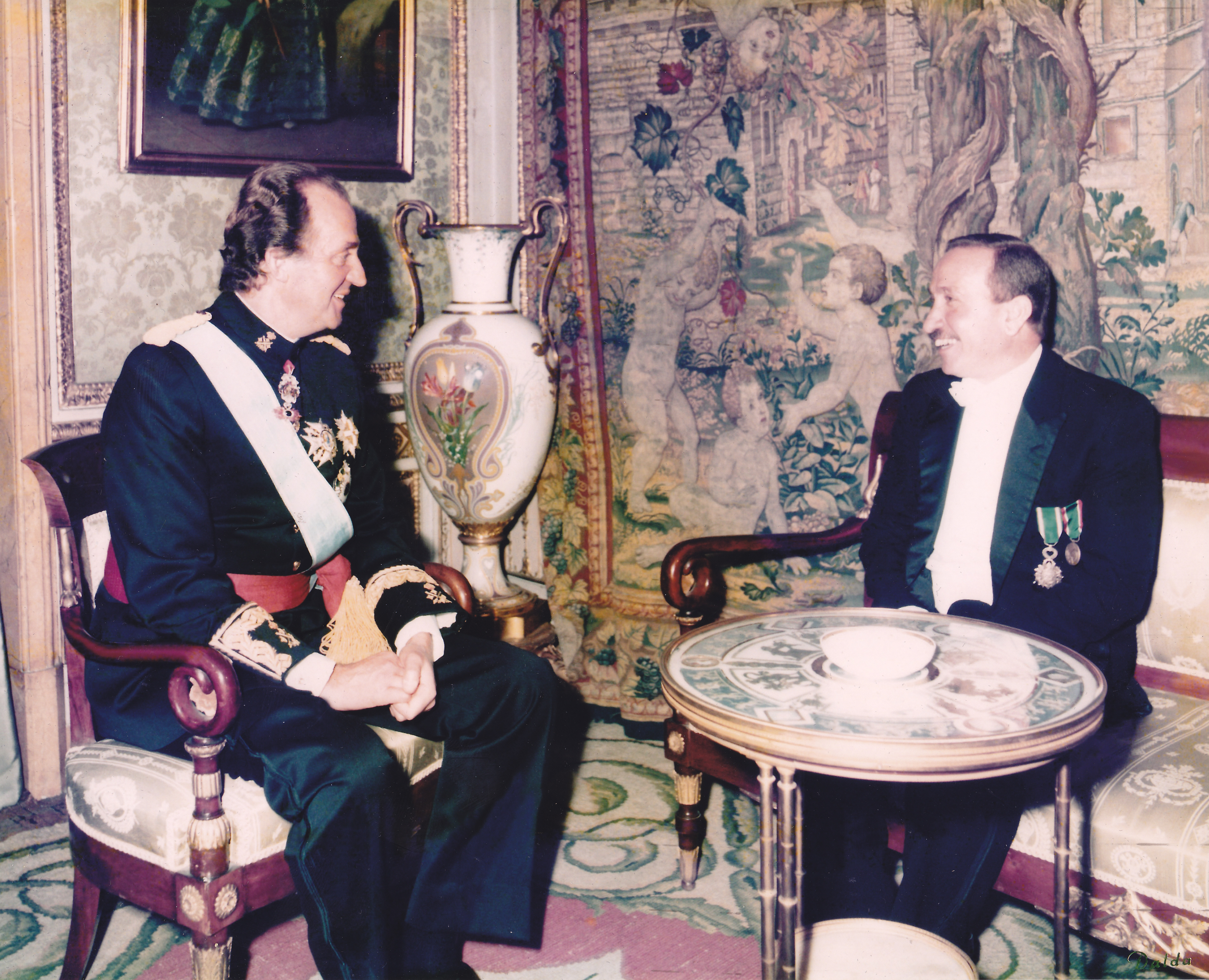
H.M. Juan Carlos I and Djelloul Khatib, Madrid, 1988

He was then posted as Ambassador to Spain between 1988 and 1989. There he marshalled the support to build the Maghreb–Europe gas pipeline between Algeria, Morocco and Spain. He also facilitated informal peace talks on the Basque conflict.
