= Nevill Barbour =

Journalist and reporter who wrote about the Arab world

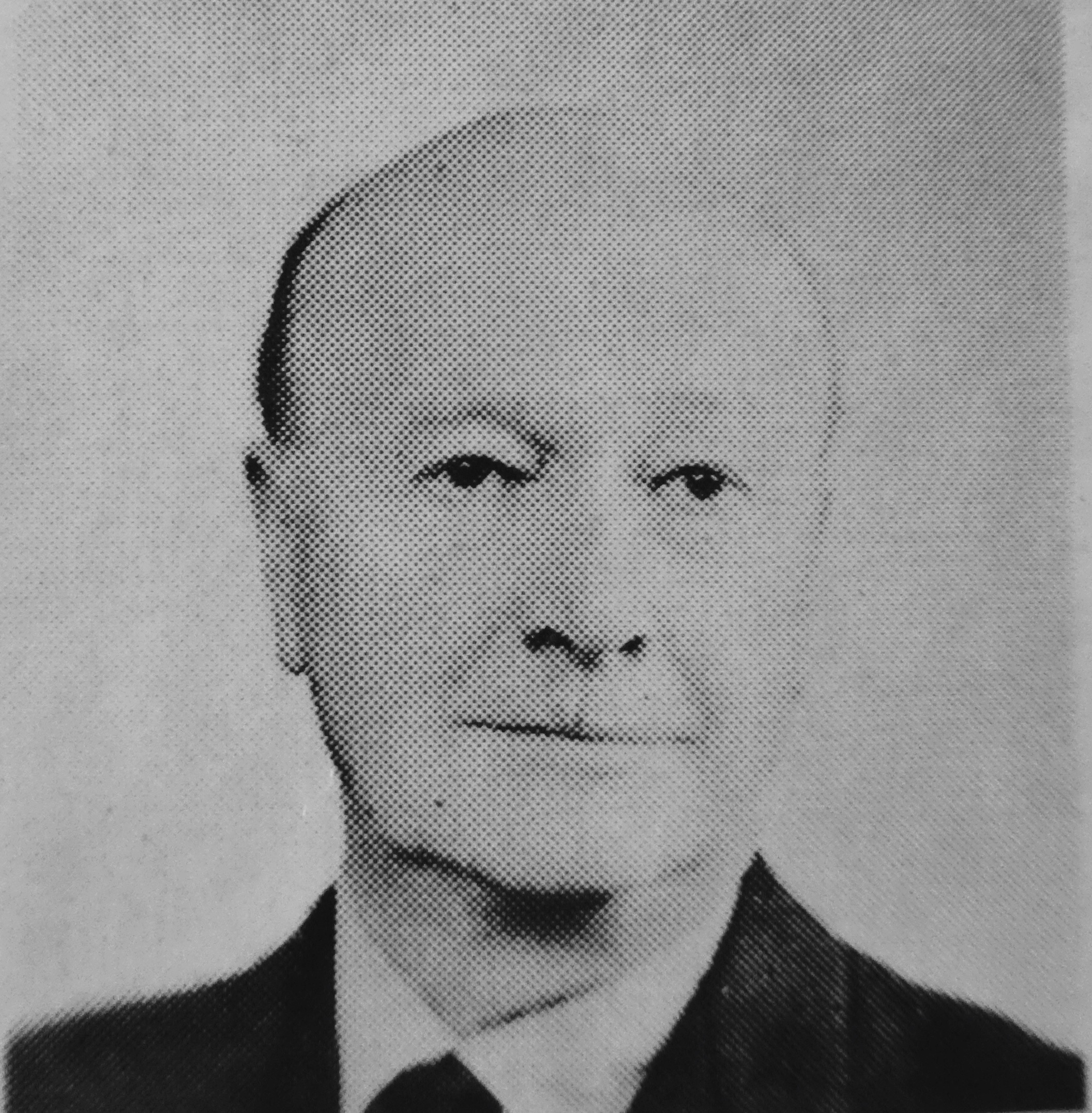
- Born: February 17, 1895; Eastbourne, England
- Died: December 1972 (aged 77)
- Occupations: journalist, reporter
- Father: Sir David Barbour

Nevill Barbour (17 February 1895 – December 1972) was a BBC journalist and reporter who wrote about the Arab world.

He was born in Eastbourne, England. He was the son of Sir David Barbour, who worked in the British bureaucracy in India. He served as the BBC correspondent in Palestine during World War II and after that returned to England, where he was appointed head of the Arab Department at the BBC. He was the editor of "The Arab Listener" published by the BBC.

During the Algerian independence movement, Barbour helped in securing the transfer of media reporters from the Tunisian border to the combat units of the interior. In particular he worked with Djelloul Khatib.

In April 1945, Barbour was one of three Christians (the others being Col. Newcombe and Ralph Beaumont MP) and three Jews (Albert Montefiore Hyamson and Jewish Fellowship members Emile Marmorstein and Rabbi Dr Israel Mattuck) as well as three Muslims to draw up A Constitution for Palestine. This was, according to Newcombe, a 'logical and moderate plea written in a matter of fact and convincing way' that attempted to show a non-Zionist solution to the Palestine problem composed by Christians, Jews and Muslims. The document broadly reiterated the Hyamson-Newcombe proposal, where an independent Palestinian state would be characterised by control of their own municipal authorities.

== Bibliography ==
- Nisi dominus: A survey of the Palestine controversy, G.G. Harrap and Co. Ltd, 1946
- North West Africa: a political and economic survey, Wilfrid Knapp, Nevill Barbour, Oxford University Press, 1977
- Palestine: star or crescent?, The Odyssey press, 1947
- Memorandum on Zionism, Palestine and the Jewish problem, 1939
- Morocco, Thames and Hudson, 1965
- A plan for lasting peace in Palestine, Syrian orphanage press, 1936
