= Henry Peck (British Army officer) =

British Army officer

Major-General Henry Peck CB CMG DSO
- Born: 17 October 1874; Templecombe, Somerset
- Died: 3 June 1965 (aged 90); Chelsea, London
- Military career
- Allegiance: United Kingdom
- Branch: British Army
- Rank: Major-General
- Commands: 44th (Home Counties) Division
- Conflicts: First World War
- Awards: Companion of the Order of the Bath; Companion of the Order of St Michael and St George; Distinguished Service Order

Major-General Henry Richardson Peck CB, CMG, DSO (17 October 1874 – 3 June 1965) was a British Army officer.

== Military career ==
Peck was commissioned into the Royal Artillery on 15 March 1895.

He was on 31 October 1910 appointed as an assistant military secretary to Lieutenant General Sir Henry Mackinnon and promoted to major on 20 April 1911.

He served in the Gallipoli campaign in the First World War for which he was appointed a Companion of the Order of St Michael and St George. On 4 August 1917 he became commander, Royal Artillery (CRA) of a division and was granted the temporary rank of brigadier general while employed in this role.

He was promoted to substantive colonel on 20 April 1920. He went on to be commander, Royal Artillery (CRA) of the 2nd Infantry Division in December 1923, was promoted to major general, and then made General Officer Commanding 44th (Home Counties) Division in January 1929 before retiring from the army on 15 July 1933.

Military offices
| Preceded by Arthur Wauchope | GOC 44th (Home Counties) Division; 1929–1933 | Succeeded by John Kennedy |
