= Harold Wilberforce-Bell =

British officer (1885–1956)

Lieutenant-general Harold Wilberforce-Bell (1885 in Portington – 1956) was an officer of the British Indian Army who served as the Resident minister for the Punjab States Agency from Lahore, having previously served as an Agent to the Governor-General of India under the Deccan States Agency from Kolhapur. He enlisted in the British Indian Army in 1905, and served in the Indian Political Department from 1910 to 1940.

Wilberforce-Bell also authored some Indological books while in India, most notably Some Translations from the Marathi Poets (1913), A Grammatical Treatise of the Marathi Language (1914), The history of Kathiawad from the earliest times (1916), and several articles on British military history. He also reported on the British Raj for The Sunday Times, The Yorkshire Post, and The Times. His papers are held at the British Library.

Descended from landed gentry in Wiltshire, he was also a member of the Athenaeum Club in London. He was made a Knight Commander of the Order of the Indian Empire in 1938.

== Selected works ==
- Some Translations from the Marathi Poets (1913)
- A Grammatical Treatise of the Marathi Language (1914)
- The history of Kathiawad from the earliest times (1916)

== See also ==
- List of Athenaeum Club members
