= Albert Montefiore Hyamson =

British civil servant and historian

Albert M Hyamson OBE
- Born: 27 August 1875; London, England
- Died: 5 October 1954 (aged 79); London
- Education: Swansea Grammar School, Beaufort College, St. Leonards
- Occupation: Civil servant
- Years active: 1895–1945
- Employer(s): Post Office, Palestine Administration, Ministry of Information
- Movement: Zionism, Bi-nationalism
- Spouse: Marie Rose Lavey (m. 1911)
- Children: 4
- Relatives: Moses Hyamson (uncle); Michael Loewe (nephew)

Albert Montefiore Hyamson, OBE (27 August 1875 – 5 October 1954) was a British civil servant and historian who served as chief immigration officer in the British Mandate of Palestine from 1921 to 1934.

== The political Zionist of the 1910s and 1920s ==
Hyamson was born in London and educated at Swansea Grammar School and Beaufort College, St Leonards. He entered the Civil Service in 1895, where he initially worked at the Post Office. During the First World War, Hyamson was one of the most active Zionist writers in the UK. His work had been published by the Anglo-Zionist lobby group, the British Palestine Committee, the Zionist leadership in London and the British press. Lloyd George even claimed that one of Hyamson's articles in the New Statesman had stimulated his interest in Zionism.

During the First World War, Hyamson was a close associate of Chaim Weizmann. In April 1917, Hyamson was made the editor of The Zionist Review (the newspaper published by the Zionist Federation). In October of that year Ze'ev Jabotinsky proposed a Jewish Bureau for the UK government's Department of Information, however as Jabotinsky was preoccupied with organising the Jewish Legion, the role fell to Hyamson. His work at the Bureau in December 1917 involved distributing news items that illustrated the British government's support for Zionism and the growing support for Zionism among the world's Jews. The main focus of his output was in America, where he distributed cables to two Jewish daily newspapers, The American Hebrew and American Jewish Chronicle. At the same time, Hyamson became a senior member of a new committee created by the London Zionist Federation designed to publicise the Zionist message. The Jewish Bureau in the Department of Information and the London Zionist Federation ran in close contact, with members of the Federation writing much of the material for the Bureau. This enabled the Department of Information to hide the official nature of its propaganda, and allowed Zionists to produce material to promote their movement. Examples of Hyamson's work for the Department of Information included Great Britain and the Jews, a pamphlet he wrote in response to the Balfour Declaration of 1917 that explained how the agreement was a part of a long tradition of British sympathy for the Jews. A film The British Re-conquering Palestine for the Jews, made after General Allenby had taken Jerusalem, which was sent to Jewish centres around the world. His book Palestine: The Rebirth of an Ancient People set out "the benefits the recent Jewish colonisation of Palestine has brought to the land". Hyamson also made Jabotinsky the official British journalist for Zionist affairs in Palestine.

Sir Herbert Samuel, the British High Commissioner of Palestine, made Hyamson Commissioner for Migration of the British Mandate for Palestine in 1921 which put him in charge of the Palestinian Administration's immigration department. Samuel reasoned that like himself, Hyamson was a Zionist, but would not give preference to these interests over those of the government. His attempts to administer British immigration quotas earned him a bad reputation, at least in Vilnius, where he was known as a 'Jewish anti-semite'. According to Edwin Samuel, the son of Sir Herbert, who worked with Hyamson in 1926, Hyamson had a "jaundiced view of his own staff: none, even the most senior, was allowed much discretion". He worked late into the night on immigration applications, deciding many of them personally. For Sir Ronald Storrs, Hyamson was one those Jews (like Norman Bentwich) whose work for the Administration of Palestine put him in an impossible position where he was criticised by both Arabs and Jews. He felt that Hyamson's attempts to apply the immigration regulations made him very unpopular with pan-Zionists despite having admitted many thousands of Jews.

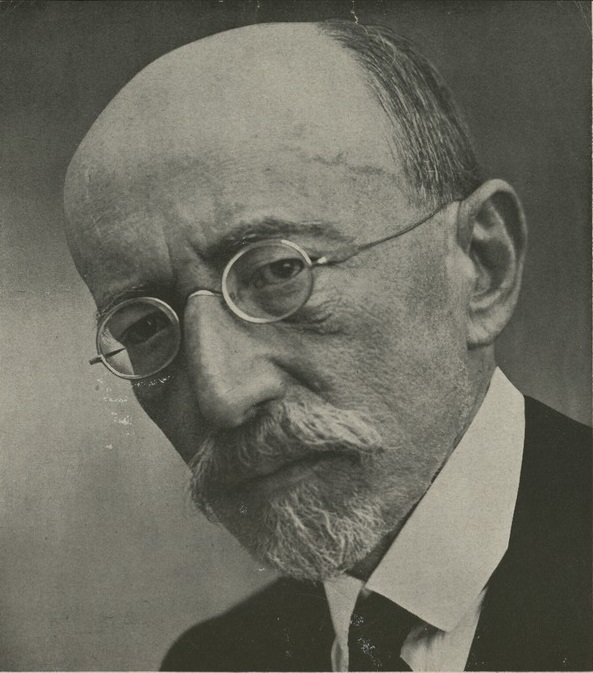
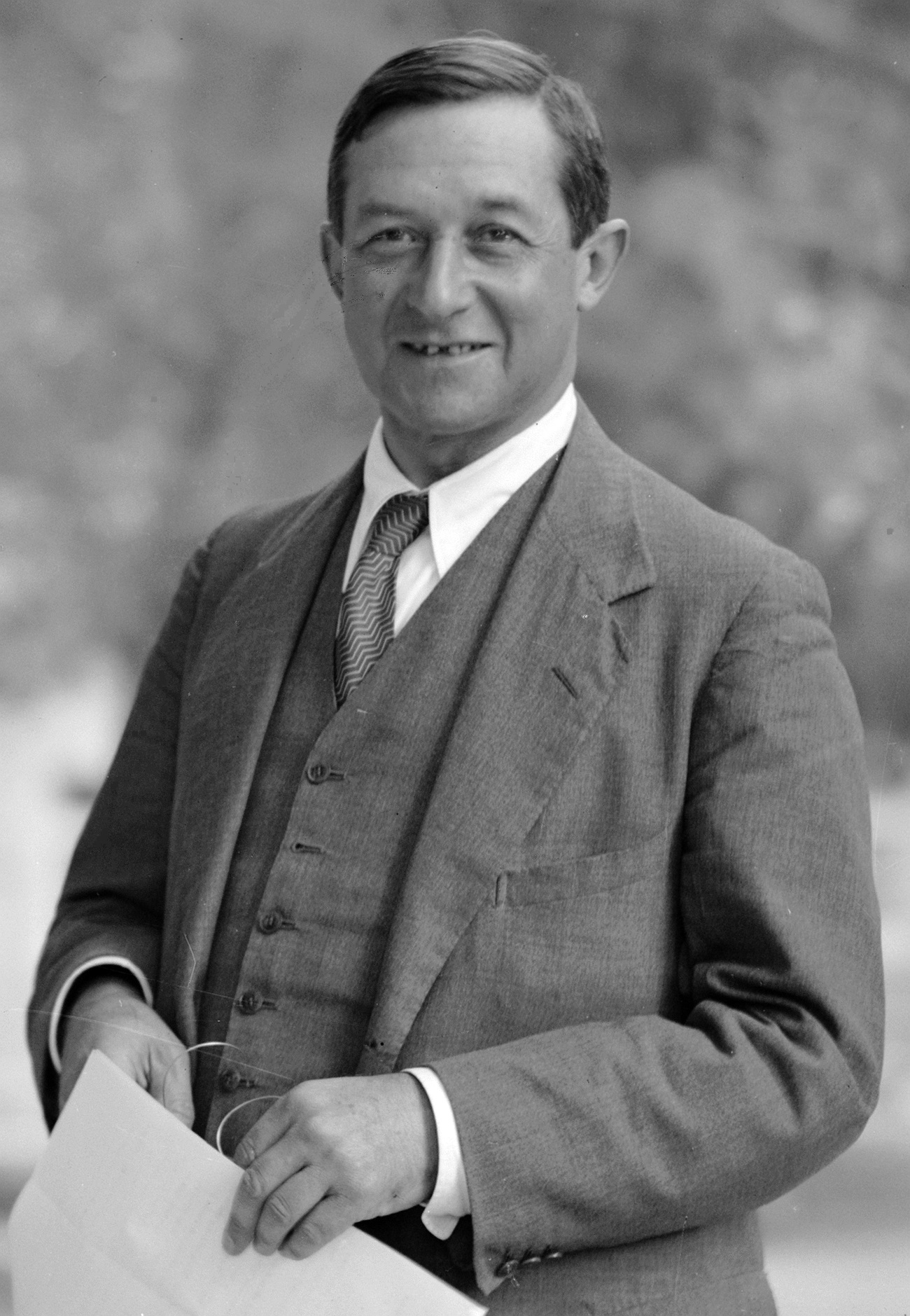
Hyamson's vision of Zionism was influenced by Ahad Ha'am and Judah L. Magnes, whom he called the "wisest thinkers among the Zionists".(Palestine: A Policy, ch. 11 p. 193)

In the summer of 1926 Hyamson went on a tour of centres of Jewish population in Eastern Europe to investigate the conditions of the countries sending the largest numbers of immigrants to Palestine. In 1928, he published a travel guide, Palestine Old and New, which The Times described as "the work of a Zionist but one who is a born traveller, with an eye for scenery and a taste for romance."

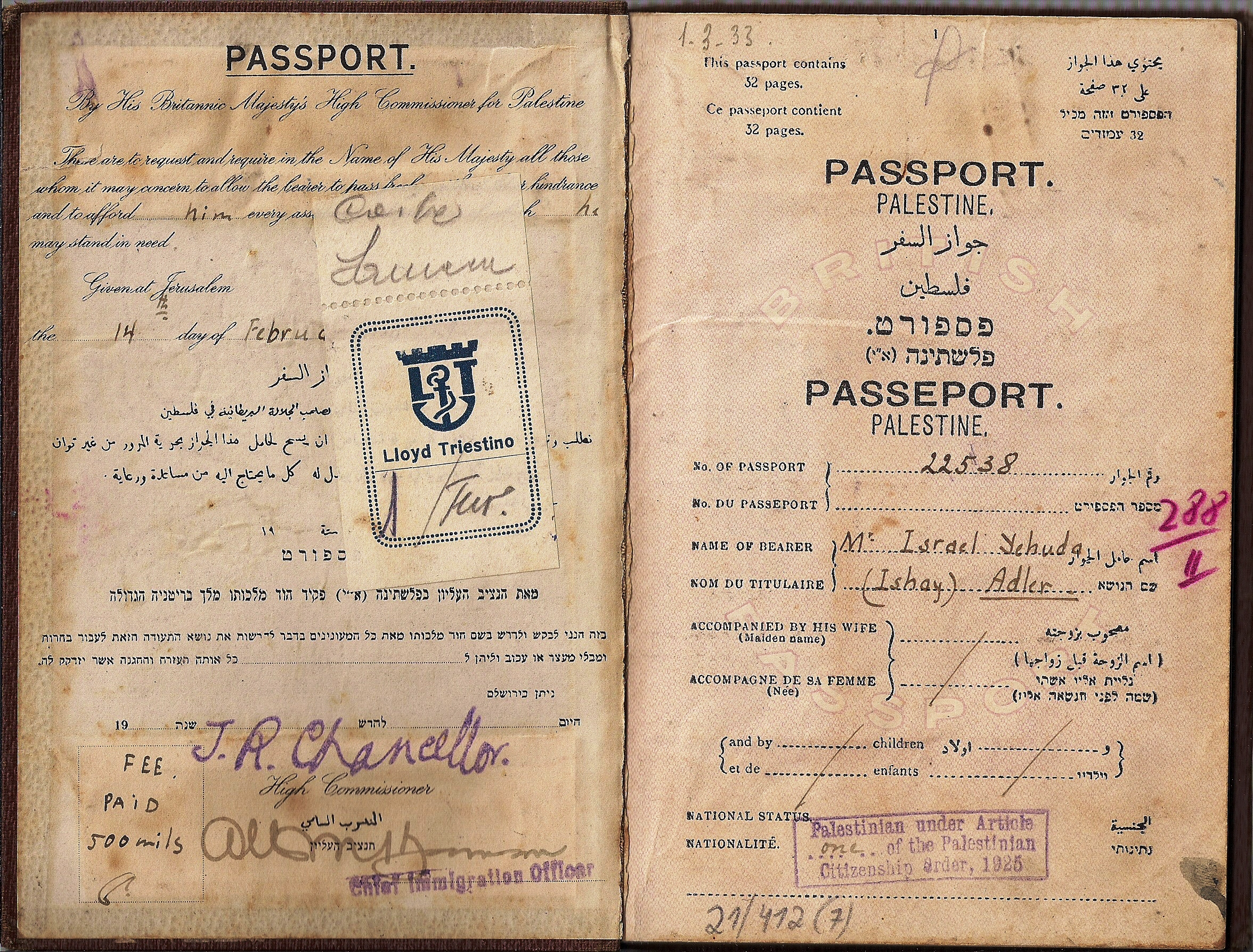
British Colonial passport for Palestine issued by Albert Montefiore Hyamson in 1929.

== The bi-nationalist of the 1930s and 1940s ==
Hyamson was made an OBE in the Birthday Honours list of 1931. The Mandate's Department of Immigration and Travel was reorganised in 1934 due to the increasing pressure of immigration from Germany. According to Edwin Samuel, Hyamson's insistence on doing as much work as possible himself had led to an application backlog of nine months. The Palestine Government responded to criticism about the situation by replacing Hyamson and his deputy Richard Badcock with Eric Mills and Samuels himself.

Talks to try to break the impasse between Arabs and Jews in Mandate Palestine took place in London during July and August 1937 between Arabs, Gentile Anti-Zionists, and Hyamson, who represented Jews opposed to a Jewish state. This led to the drafting of the Hyamson-Newcombe proposal in August–September 1937. S.F. Newcombe was a leading British Arabist who had been a colleague of T. E. Lawrence in the First World War and was the treasurer of the Palestine Information Office (the leading Gentile anti-Zionist lobbying group in the UK at the time). The Hyamson-Newcombe proposal suggested the founding of an independent Palestinian state with all citizens having equal rights and each community had autonomy, including for municipal authority for Jewish villages, towns and districts. It also stated that a Jewish State could not be created in any part of Palestine in the future, that the existing Arab majority would continue to rule, there would be limits on land sales to Jews, and although Jewish immigration could continue Jews should constitute no more than 50% of the population. The Zionist leadership rejected the proposal, while Judah Leon Magnes (who had received a letter from David Ben-Gurion warning him that it was a 'deception') welcomed the ideas as the 'portals to an agreement'. Magnes then used the proposal to work with moderate Arabs on an alternative to partition that was not tainted by official British endorsement. His efforts, however, fell through.

"It may be that the Palestine problem is insoluble. In any event there is no solution on Solomon's lines, even with the addition of two cities of refuge. But there is another line that might be followed, in which there is at least a germ of hope. This is to keep before one the ideal of a united Palestine, with Jewish and Arab citizens all civilly and politically equal and free. Both these communities - if religious instead of racial lines are followed there would be more than two - should be given the widest possible autonomy in all matters - cultural, religious, even municipal - that concern their members alone."
From Hyamson's letter to The Times in May 1937

In 1942 Hyamson published Palestine: A Policy, his work outlining his case against political Zionism and for a 'spiritual Zionism'. He was one of the original members of The Jewish Fellowship, founded on 7 November 1944, to campaign against (political) Zionism from a Jewish perspective. Founding members also included Basil Henriques, Sir Brunel Cohen, Joseph Leftwich, Louis Gluckstein, and Rabbi Israel Mattuck. The fellowship saw political Zionism as damaging the good relations the diaspora had achieved in the country of their birth, and as linked to a moral decline within Jewry. They held that the solution to problems faced by the Jewish community would be found in the revival of religious principles rather than political ones. By 1947, Leftwich felt that Hyamson was trying to turn the Fellowship into an organisation similar to Judah Magnes' Ihud (which sought Jewish-Arab co-operation for a bi-national unitary state).

In April 1945, Hyamsom was one of three Jews (the others being Jewish Fellowship members Emile Marmorstein and Rabbi Dr Israel Mattuck), and three Christians (Col. Newcombe, Arab specialist Nevill Barbour and Ralph Beaumont MP) as well as three Arabs to draw up A Constitution for Palestine. This was, according to Newcombe, a 'logical and moderate plea written in a matter of fact and convincing way' that attempted to show a non-Zionist solution to the Palestine problem composed by Christians, Jews and Muslims. The document broadly reiterated the Hyamson-Newcombe proposal, where an independent Palestinian state would be characterised by control of their own municipal authorities. However, the document did not refer to, or support, the more contentious clauses of the MacDonald White Paper of 1939, specifically clause 10(6) which called of an independent Palestinian state, and clause 10(7) which gave Arabs control over immigration. Although Hyamson and his Jewish colleagues were in agreement with the White Paper, these clauses were omitted so the Constitution would appeal to more Jews.

== Personal life ==
Hyamson's uncle was Rabbi Moses Hyamson. He married Marie Rose Lavey in 1911, they had four children, two boys and two girls. The boys were both killed during the Second World War. Captain Theodore David Hyamson RE who died of wounds in Singapore aged 27 in February 1942. Corporal Philipp Hyamson RAF was killed on active service in August 1944.

In 1904 he was the honorary secretary of the Union of Jewish Literary Societies. He became a Fellow of the Royal Historical Society. Hyamson was President of the Jewish Historical Society of England from 1945 to 1947, and Honorary Editor of Publications for the society from 1944 until his death in 1954.

== Bibliography ==
- Albert Montefiore Hyamson (1903). The Lost Tribes, and the influence of the search for them on the return of the Jews to England. The Jewish Quarterly Review.
- Albert Montefiore Hyamson (1906). A dictionary of artists and art terms: (architects, engravers, painters, sculptors, etc.). G. Routledge & Sons.
- John Bertram Askew; Albert Montefiore Hyamson (1906). Pros and cons: a newspaper reader's and debater's guide to the leading controversies of the day. Routledge.
- Albert Montefiore Hyamson (1907). A dictionary of the Bible. Illustrated.
- Albert Montefiore Hyamson (1909). The humour of the post office. George Routledge & Sons.
- Albert Montefiore Hyamson (1916). A dictionary of universal biography of all ages and of all peoples. Routledge.
- Albert Montefiore Hyamson; Richard Hakluyt; Edward Handley-Read (1912). Elizabethan adventurers upon the Spanish Main (adapted from the "Voyages" of Richard Hakluyt): by Albert M. Hyamson ... with eight plates by Edward Handley-Read. G. Routledge & sons, limited.
- Albert Montefiore Hyamson (1917). British projects for the restoration of the Jews. The British Palestine committee.
- Albert Montefiore Hyamson (1917). Palestine, the Rebirth of an Ancient People. Nabu Press. ISBN 1-176-92036-7.
- Albert Montefiore Hyamson (1922). A dictionary of English phrases: phraseological allusions, catchwords, stereotyped modes of speech and metaphors, nicknames, sobriquets, derivations from personal names, etc., with explanations and thousands of exact references to their sources or early usage. Routledge.
- Albert Montefiore Hyamson (1928). A History of the Jews in England. Forgotten Books. ISBN 1-4400-4236-5.
- Albert Montefiore Hyamson (1928). Palestine old and new. R. M. McBride & company.
- Edgar Fletcher-Allen; Albert Montefiore Hyamson (1932). The Mediterranean. Methuen & Co. Ltd.
- Albert Montefiore Hyamson (1933). Moses Montefiore, his life and times. Jewish Religious Educational Publications.
- Albert Montefiore Hyamson (1934). Judas Maccabaeus: the hammer of God. M. L. Cailingold.
- Albert Montefiore Hyamson; Abraham Maurice Silbermann (1938). Vallentine's Jewish Encyclopedia. Shapiro, Vallentine.
- Albert Montefiore Hyamson (1939). David Salomons. Methuen.
- Albert Montefiore Hyamson (1939). The British Consulate in Jerusalem in Relation to the Jews of Palestine, 1838–1914, Volume 2. Jewish Historical Society of England. ISBN 0-404-56278-7.
- Albert Montefiore Hyamson (1942). Palestine: A Policy. Methuen & Co., Ltd. ISBN 0-88355-325-2.
- Albert Montefiore Hyamson (1946). A dictionary of international affairs. Public Affairs Press, American Council on Public Affairs.
- Albert Montefiore Hyamson (1947). The Jews of England. Union of Liberal and Progressive Synagogues.
- Albert Montefiore Hyamson (1950). Palestine under the mandate, 1920–1948. Methuen.
- Albert Montefiore Hyamson (1951). The Sephardim of England: a history of the Spanish and Portuguese Jewish community, 1492–1951. Methuen.
- Albert Montefiore Hyamson (1954). The London Board for Shechita, 1804–1954. London Board for Shechita.
- Albert Montefiore Hyamson (1955). Jews' College, London, 1855–1955. Jews' College.
