= John Kennedy (British Army officer, born 1878) =

British Army officer (1878–1948)

Major-General Sir John Kennedy GBE CB CMG DSO & Bar
- Born: 1878
- Died: 1948 (aged 69–70)
- Military career
- Allegiance: United Kingdom
- Branch: British Army
- Service years: 1898–1937
- Rank: Major-General
- Unit: Argyll and Sutherland Highlanders
- Commands: 1st Division; 44th (Home Counties) Division; 19th Indian Infantry Brigade; 2nd Battalion Buffs (Royal East Kent Regiment); 26th Brigade; 7th Battalion Seaforth Highlanders
- Conflicts: First World War
- Awards: Knight Grand Cross of the Order of the British Empire; Companion of the Order of the Bath; Companion of the Order of St Michael and St George; Distinguished Service Order & Bar; Mentioned in Despatches; Officer of the Order of the Nile (Egypt)

Major-General Sir John Kennedy (1878–1948) was a senior British Army officer who served in the First World War and commanded the 1st Division.

== Military career ==
Educated at Haileybury, Kennedy was commissioned into the Argyll and Sutherland Highlanders in 1898.

He served with the Egyptian Army until the First World War, when he fought on the Western Front; he became commanding officer of the 7th Battalion, Seaforth Highlanders in 1916 and succeeded Archibald Ritchie, was promoted to temporary brigadier general, and was assigned to command the 26th (Highland) Brigade in December 1916. He was appointed inspector of infantry in October 1918 and, after relinquishing his temporary rank and assignment in June 1919, became an instructor at the Senior Officers School in 1919 and commanding officer of the 2nd Battalion, The Buffs in 1923.

He went on to lead the 19th Indian Infantry Brigade in 1926, and was appointed General Officer Commanding 44th (Home Counties) Division in January 1933 and General Officer Commanding the 1st Division in April 1934 before retiring in 1937.

Military offices
| Preceded by Henry Peck | GOC 44th (Home Counties) Division; 1933–1934 | Succeeded by John Minshull-Ford |
| Preceded by Wentworth Harman | GOC 1st Division; 1934–1936 | Succeeded by Clement Armitage |
