= David Barbour =

British writer (1841–1928)

David Miller Barbour
- Portrait of Barbour in 1917 by Walter Stoneman
- Born: 28 December 1841
- Died: 12 November 1928 (aged 86)

Sir David Miller Barbour KCSI KCMG (28 December 1841 – 12 November 1928) was a British writer and civil servant in British India.

== Early Life ==
Barbour was born on 29 December 1841, at Calkill House near Omagh. His parents were Miller Barbour and his wife, Margaret Denny. He was educated at Omagh Academy and Queens College Belfast, graduating in 1862. On graduating he took the ICS examination, placing sixth overall and first in mathematics.

== Career ==
He left for India in 1863, arriving in December, where he served at all times in the Finance branch ending as a Financial Member of the Indian Viceroy's Council under Henry Petty-Fitzmaurice, 5th Marquess of Lansdowne. In 1880, he published a pamphlet under the initial D. B., Our Afghan Policy and the Occupation of Candahar, that called for the withdrawal of the British occupation of Afghanistan. He was awarded an honorary LLD by the Royal University of Ireland in 1882. He became noted for his commentary of the silver markets and the potential depressive effect on the Indian economy.

In 1896 Barbour served as a royal commissioner to the sugar-growing colonies of the West Indies, and in 1897 as a commissioner to inquire into the finances of Jamaica. He was created a Knight Commander of the Order of the Star of India (KCSI) for his services in India, and subsequently Knight Commander of the Order of St Michael and St George (KCMG) on 17 July 1899 for his various financial services to the British Government.

In 1900 Barbour was chosen to go to South Africa to report on the financial situation in the newly-annexed Transvaal and Orange River Colony. He subsequently became a director of Standard Bank in 1901, holding the post to at least 1922. From 1903 to 1905 he was chairman of the Royal Commission on London Traffic.

== Family and death ==
Barbour married Katherine Constance, daughter of Thomas Gribble, in 1883. They had 3 sons, including Nevill Barbour, and one daughter. Barbour died at his home, Tiltwood, Crawley Down, Sussex, on 12 February 1928.

== Publications ==
- The Theory of Bimetallism (1885)
- The Standard of Value (1912)
- The Influence of the Gold Supply on Profits and Prices (1913)
