= MacDonald letter =

The MacDonald letter, also known in contemporary Arabic sources as the Black Letter (Arabic : الورقة السوداء), was a letter from British prime minister Ramsay MacDonald to Chaim Weizmann on 13 February 1931 regarding the passage of the Passfield white paper, which recommended restrictions on Jewish immigration to Palestine, as well as Jewish purchases of land in Palestine. Zionist organizations worldwide mounted a vigorous campaign against the document, which culminated in MacDonald's "clarification" of the White Paper, reaffirming British support for the continuation of Jewish immigration and land purchase in Palestine. It was considered a withdrawal of the Passfield white paper, despite the fact that Prime Minister stated in parliament on 11 February 1931 that he was "very unwilling to give the letter the same status as the dominating document" i.e. the Passfield white paper. The letter itself also claimed the importance of justice for "non-Jewish sections of the community".

In secret testimony to the Peel Commission, Weizmann admitted that he was sent a draft of the letter in advance so that he could make necessary amendments.

Palestinian Arabs renounced the letter as the "Black Letter", primarily upset because Jewish immigration continued with increasing numbers, the purchase of land by Jews continued without restrictions, and the steps taken to protect Arab peasants from being removed from their land were ineffective. By confirming that the policy of the Palestine Mandate was to continue to support Jewish immigration, the letter in effect negated the implications of the White Paper and facilitated increasing Jewish immigration until the White Paper of 1939.
