= Churchill White Paper =

1922 British Policy in Palestine

Front cover of the white paper

Pages 17–21, "British Policy in Palestine" sometimes known as the "Churchill memorandum"

The Churchill White Paper of 3 June 1922 (sometimes referred to as "British Policy in Palestine") was drafted at the request of Winston Churchill, then Secretary of State for the Colonies, partly in response to the 1921 Jaffa Riots. The official name of the document was Palestine: Correspondence with the Palestine Arab Delegation and the Zionist Organisation. The white paper was made up of nine documents and "Churchill's memorandum" was an enclosure to document number 5. While maintaining Britain's commitment to the Balfour Declaration and its promise of a Jewish national home in Mandatory Palestine, the paper emphasized that the establishment of a national home would not impose a Jewish nationality on the Arab inhabitants of Palestine. To reduce tensions between the Arabs and Jews in Palestine the paper called for a limitation of Jewish immigration to the economic capacity of the country to absorb new arrivals. This limitation was considered a great setback to many in the Zionist movement, though it acknowledged that the Jews should be able to increase their numbers through immigration rather than sufferance.

== Antecedents ==
=== Emergent resistance ===
On 23 October 1918 following the Sinai and Palestine Campaign of World War I, the Occupied Enemy Territory Administration was established over Levantine provinces of the former Ottoman Empire. Earlier, on 1 October 1918, General Allenby had been authorized to permit the hoisting of the Arab flag at Damascus. An Arab government was announced on 5 October 1918 and gained de facto independence after the withdrawal of the British forces on 26 November 1919. During 1918, Muslim-Christian Associations were set up across Palestine with a view to opposing Zionism and later established the Palestine Arab Congress to further that objective. On the first anniversary of the Balfour Declaration in November 1918 there were non-violent protests. Petitions against Zionist policy were delivered to Ronald Storrs as well as the Governor of Jaffa. In early 1919, the first Palestinian Arab Congress rejected political Zionism. Palestine was seen as part of an independent Syria under Faisal bin Hussein. It was decided to send a delegation to Damascus and representatives attended the Syrian National Congress in Damascus on 8 June 1919 "to inform Arab patriots there of the decision to call Palestine Southern Syria and unite it with Northern Syria".

The Arab Kingdom of Syria was an unrecognized state proclaimed as a Kingdom on 8 March 1920 and existed until 25 July 1920. During its brief existence, the kingdom was led by Faisal, the son of Sharif Hussein bin Ali. Despite its claims to the region of Syria, Faisal's government controlled a limited area and was dependent on Britain which, along with France, generally opposed the idea of a Greater Syria and refused to recognize the kingdom.

Shortly after the Jerusalem riots of early April, the San Remo conference at the end of April 1920, awarded the Palestine mandate to Britain and the authorities decided to refuse permission for the convening of a second Palestinian Arab Congress intended to address the new situation.

In a lecture given at the UN, Rashid Khalidi noted that the Palestine reaction to the declaration was delayed by the continuing closure of newspapers for two years and the dismal post-war circumstances of the country. The military administration had decided not to publish the Balfour Declaration for fear of the consequences. After the appointment of Herbert Samuel was known, on 28 April 1920 in Acre, General Bols informed the "representatives of all communities" that the mandate and declaration would be included in the peace treaty with Turkey. The Palin Commission speculated that, in view of all the later "misunderstandings", it might have been wiser to have published the declaration in the first instance and avoid the confusion. It was not until May 1920 that the text of the Balfour Declaration was read out in Nablus by Sir Louis Bols.

=== At Cairo and Jerusalem ===
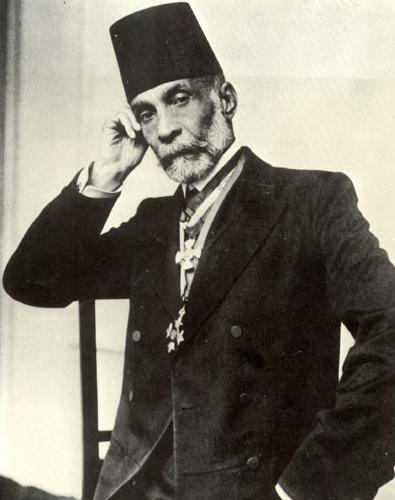
Musa Kazim al-Husayni, ex-mayor of Jerusalem

The Executive Committee of the third Palestine Arab Congress, headed by Musa Kazim al-Husseini, met the new High Commissioner, Herbert Samuel, who refused to give them any official recognition unless they accepted British policy for a Jewish national home. Having been rebuffed in their attempt to have discussions with Churchill in Cairo, on 28 March 1921, the committee instead met Churchill in Jerusalem for that part of the Cairo conference and presented a memorandum detailing their complaints; while he assured the committee that in respect of the second part of the Balfour Declaration,"if one promise stands so does the other", he said that it was a matter of policy and the Arabs could do nothing other than accept it and the consequences, including Jewish immigration.

In Cairo, Palestine had been discussed with Emir Abdullah who argued that he should be given control of the entire area of Mandate Palestine responsible to the High Commissioner. Alternatively he advocated a union with Iraq. Churchill rejected both demands. Responding to Abdullah's fear for a Jewish kingdom west of the Jordan, Churchill decreed it was not only not contemplated "that hundreds and thousands of Jews were going to pour into the country in a very short time and dominate the existing population", but even was quite impossible. "Jewish immigration would be a very slow process and the rights of the existing non-Jewish population would be strictly preserved." About British policy in Palestine, Herbert Samuel added that "There was no question of setting up a Jewish Government there ... No land would be taken from any Arab, nor would the Moslem religion be touched in any way."

=== In London ===
The fourth congress, on 25 June 1921, voted to send a six-man delegation to London which left Palestine on 19 July 1921. After a short visit to Cairo, the delegation went to Rome where they were received in audience by Pope Benedict XV who expressed sympathy with their cause. The delegation (usually referred to as the Palestinian Arab or Muslim-Christian Delegation) arrived in London on August 8. Three members of the delegation went to Geneva and joined the Syrian–Palestinian Congress to put their case to the League of Nations and to protest the draft mandate. The president of the delegation was Musa Kazim al-Husseini. Its secretary was Shibli al-Jamal (Dr. Fu'ad Samad, assistant secretary) and the other 4 delegates were Tawfiq Hammad, Amin al-Tamimi, Ibrahim Shammas, Mu'in al-Madi. Three meetings with Churchill were had in August and other discussions and correspondence with Colonial Office officials along with meeting Weizmann in November all of which were fruitless since the delegation effectively wanted the policy abandoned altogether and the British were not prepared to countenance anything other than minor adjustments. Finally, the draft of the proposed Palestine constitution was sent to the delegation in February and their response marks the first document published in the white paper.

=== Jaffa riots ===
The May 1921 riots in and around Jaffa were the subject of a report published on 1 October 1921, determining the main cause as being due to Arab discontent about Jewish immigration and perceived pro-Jewish bias by Mandatory authorities. Its remit was expanded to include looking into any recent disturbances in Palestine so also considered the unpublished Palin report into the April 1920 Jerusalem riots. The White paper was intended to address the issues that had been identified.

== Statement of policy in Palestine ==
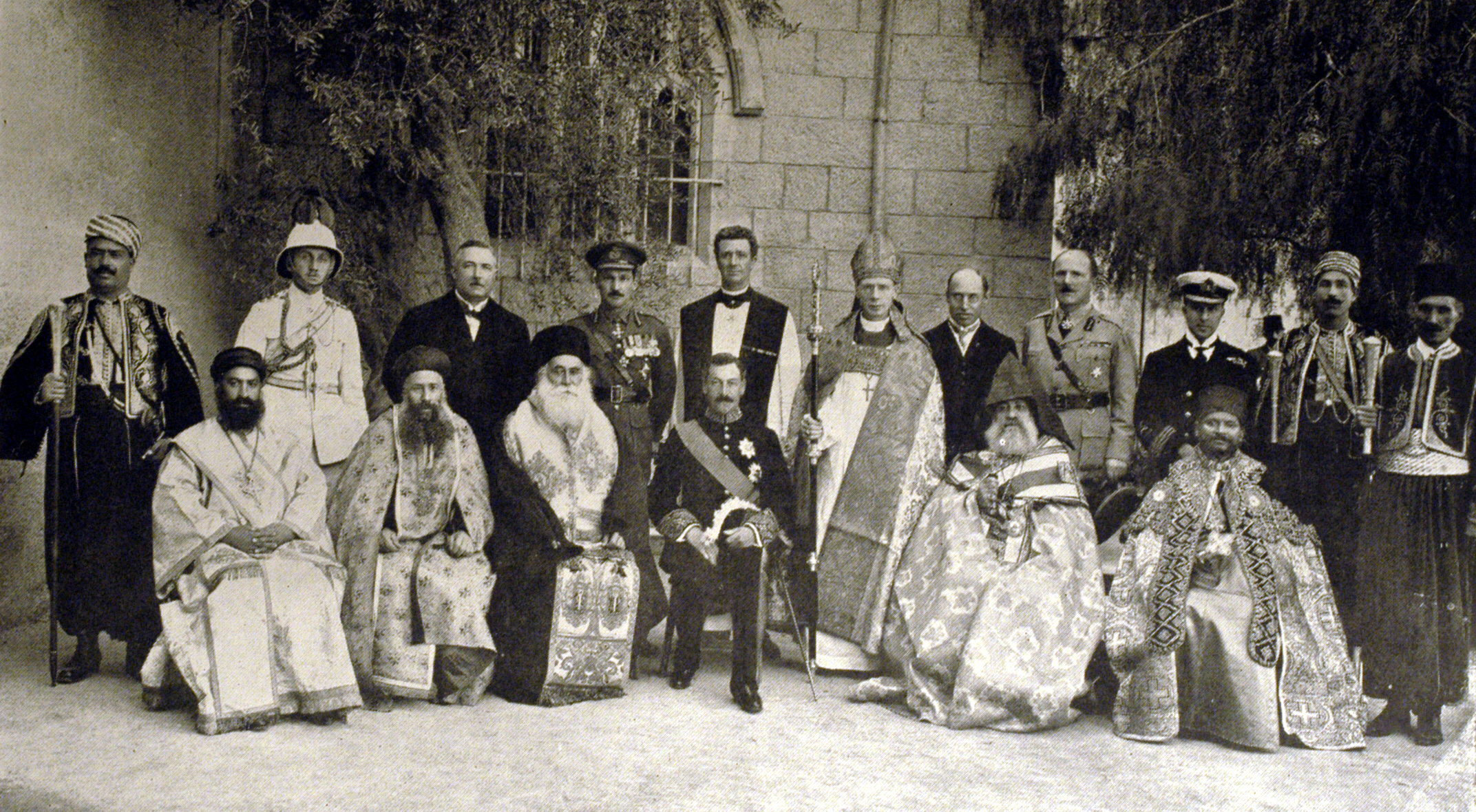
Sir Herbert Samuel, seated centre, with Jerusalem church leaders and British officials, 1922.

On 3 June 1921, Samuel made a speech (quoted from in paragraph 6 of the 1 March 1922 document #2 of the white paper) which McTague describes as a necessary effort, after more than three years, to define the Balfour Declaration. As one author put it, quoting a 6 June 1920 report to the Foreign Office, "..what struck me most of all was that nobody seemed to know what the Zionist policy of His Majesty’s Government meant." Churchill quoted Samuel in the first full parliamentary debate of 14 June 1921 on Palestine and wherein he defended the policy and the mandates arguing that it had all been agreed prior, it was important for Britain to keep its word and that provided immigration were properly regulated then that would benefit the economy.

It was Herbert Samuel who insisted, on returning to London in May, on a "definitive" interpretation of the Declaration. Although supporting the principle, the policy restricted the interpretation of a "national home," geographically excluding the territory east of the Jordan River; politically, by defining it in terms of "development of the existing community"; and numerically, limiting future immigration to "the economic capacity of the country".

The "British Policy in Palestine" (enclosure in document #5 of the white paper) was accepted by the Zionist Organization (document #7 of the white paper) and rejected by the Palestinians (document #6 of the white paper) Shortly thereafter, the House of Lords rejected a Palestine Mandate that incorporated the Balfour Declaration by 60 votes to 25. The vote was subsequently overruled by a vote of 292 to 35 in the House of Commons. (Note: Churchill concluded the Commons debate with the following argument: "Palestine is all the more important to us... in view of the ever-growing significance of the Suez Canal; and I do not think £1,000,000 a year... would be too much for Great Britain to pay for the control and guardianship of this great historic land, and for keeping the word that she has given before all the nations of the world." Mathew described Churchill's manoeuvre as follows: "...the judgment was overturned by a large majority in the Commons, a result not of a sudden opinion shift but of Churchill's skillful opportunism in turning at the last minute a general debate on funding for the colonies worldwide into a vote of confidence on the government's Palestine policy, emphasizing in his concluding remarks not a Zionist argument but imperial and strategic considerations.)

The white paper, formalized as the Palestine Order in Council in August, reaffirmed the British commitment to a national home, promised that Palestine would not become a Jewish State and that Arabs would not be subordinated to Jews. Fieldhouse further says that the white paper "interpreted and subtly modified the harshness of the mandate." It pointed out that the Balfour Declaration did "not contemplate that Palestine as a whole should be converted into a Jewish national home, but that such a home should be founded in Palestine" and affirming the right to Jewish immigration but subject to the concept of "economic absorptive capacity".

Evyatar Friesel says that the terms of the Churchill Memorandum and the Mandate were "clearly contradictory". There was a "double obligation" to Jew and non-Jew. The idea of a national home in Palestine as a whole was refuted while accepting that Jews were in Palestine "as of right and not on sufferance".

Renton, while noting that Zionist commitments in the Mandate went beyond the Declaration in recognizing the historical connection of the Jewish people with Palestine, along with the "grounds for reconstituting their national home in that country" and that Britain had to secure the establishment of a "Jewish national home" also says that the Mandatory had the responsibility for developing self-governing institutions for the whole population of Palestine, not just Jews, and for "safeguarding the civil and religious rights of all the inhabitants of Palestine". The problem was that neither the declaration nor the Mandate defined the national home; the rights of the "non-Jewish" population and how they might be affected by the creation of the national home, and how they were to be "safeguarded", were not specified. These loose terms did not provide any clarity as to how the country should be governed, or its essential purpose, a fundamental deficiency inherited from the Declaration.

In the matter of the claim put forward by the Palestinian Arab delegation with respect to the McMahon-Hussein correspondence, Kedourie notes that McMahon was asked about the matter and that his letter of 12 March 1922 only "added to the confusion". Although Samuel pressed for publication John Evelyn Shuckburgh, head of Colonial Office Middle East policy, considered nothing would be gained not least because the Palestinian Arab delegation had already been given a different argument for the exclusion of Palestine from McMahon's pledge. Kedourie also opines that it is doubtful that publication would have put an end to the argument and that the reply given in the white paper correspondence was "by no means" an answer to the claim.

== Subsequent developments ==
In February 1923, following a change in government, Cavendish, in a lengthy memorandum for the Cabinet, laid the foundation for a secret review of Palestine policy:

It would be idle to pretend that the Zionist policy is other than an unpopular one. It has been bitterly attacked in Parliament and is still being fiercely assailed in certain sections of the press. The ostensible grounds of attack are threefold:(1) the alleged violation of the McMahon pledges; (2) the injustice of imposing upon a country a policy to which the great majority of its inhabitants are opposed; and (3) the financial burden upon the British taxpayer. ...

His covering note asked for a statement of policy to be made as soon as possible and that the cabinet ought to focus on three questions: (1) whether or not pledges to the Arabs conflict with the Balfour declaration; (2) if not, whether the new government should continue the policy set down by the old government in the 1922 White Paper; and (3) if not, what alternative policy should be adopted.

Stanley Baldwin, replacing Bonar Law, in June 1923 set up a cabinet subcommittee whose terms of reference were:

examine Palestine policy afresh and to advise the full Cabinet whether Britain should remain in Palestine and whether if she remained, the pro-Zionist policy should be continued.

The Cabinet approved the report of this committee on 31 July 1923. Describing it as "nothing short of remarkable", Quigley noted that the government was admitting to itself that its support for Zionism had been prompted by considerations having nothing to do with the merits of Zionism or its consequences for Palestine. As Huneidi noted, "wise or unwise, it is well nigh impossible for any government to extricate itself without a substantial sacrifice of consistency and self-respect, if not honour."

The wording of the declaration was thus incorporated into the British Mandate for Palestine, a legal instrument that created Mandatory Palestine with an explicit purpose of putting the declaration into effect and was finally formalized in September 1923. Unlike the declaration itself, the Mandate was legally binding on the British government. In June, 1924, Britain made its report to the Permanent Mandates Commission for the period July 1920 to the end of 1923 containing nothing of the candor reflected in the internal documents; the documents relating to the 1923 reappraisal stayed secret until the early 1970s.

== See also ==
- Sykes-Picot Agreement
- Passfield white paper
- White Paper of 1939

== Bibliography ==
- Huneidi, Sahar (2001). A Broken Trust: Sir Herbert Samuel, Zionism and the Palestinians. I.B.Tauris. p. 84. ISBN 978-1-86064-172-5.
- Ingrams, Doreen (2009). Palestine papers: 1917–1922: seeds of conflict. Eland. ISBN 978-1-906011-38-3.
- Mathew, William M. (1 January 2011). "War-Time Contingency and the Balfour Declaration of 1917: An Improbable Regression". Journal of Palestine Studies. 40 (2): 26–42. doi:10.1525/jps.2011.xl.2.26.
- McTague, John (1983). British Policy in Palestine, 1917-22. University Press of America. p. 286. ISBN 0-8191-2934-8.
- Quigley, John (2011). "Britain's Secret Re-Assessment of the Balfour Declaration.The Perfidy of Albion". Journal of the History of International Law. 13 (2): 249–283. doi:10.1163/15718050-13020001.
- Huneidi, Sahar (1998). "Was Balfour Policy Reversible? The Colonial Office and Palestine, 1921–23". Journal of Palestine Studies. 27 (2): 23–41. doi:10.1525/jps.1998.27.2.00p0033m. JSTOR 2538282.
- Cohen, Michael J. (2010). "Was the Balfour Declaration at risk in 1923? Zionism and British imperialism". Journal of Israeli History. 29 (1).
- Renton, James (2016). "Flawed Foundations: The Balfour Declaration and the Palestine Mandate". In Miller, Rory (ed.). Britain, Palestine and Empire: The Mandate Years. Routledge. pp. 15–37. ISBN 978-1-317-17233-8.
- Porath, Yehoshua (1974). The emergence of the Palestinian-Arab national movement, 1918-1929. Cass. ISBN 978-0-7146-2939-1.
- United Nations (1978). The Origins and Evolution of the Palestine Problem 1917-1988. United Nations. p. 278.
