= Union of Jewish Literary Societies =

The Union of Jewish Literary Societies was an association of societies founded in 1902 in London for the diffusion of Jewish literature, history, and sociology, and for the co-ordination of the work of Jewish literary societies. The organization grew out of a conference of Jewish literary societies convened by the North London Jewish Literary and Social Union, chief among whose objects was the study of Jewish literature, history, and sociology. Its first president was Israel Abrahams.

The union had constituent societies in many districts of the British Empire. Each reserved its complete local independence, and was not controlled by the central organization. The union, however, rendered assistance to the constituent societies in many ways. It published a directory of Anglo-Jewish lecturers, with a supplementary list of Jewish literateurs living abroad who had placed papers prepared by them at its disposal. It also provided literary material and guidance for members of the constituent societies desirous of preparing lectures, and it arranged a number of illustrated lectures for their use.

An important feature of the work of the union was its publications. In addition to a number of pamphlets, it issued yearly, in time for the annual conference of constituent societies held in the month of June, the Jewish Literary Annual, which, besides supplying a record of the work of the union and its constituent societies during the previous year, contained the installation address of the retiring president and a selection of the papers read before the constituent societies during the preceding twelve months. Another feature was a bibliography of books and essays of Jewish interest published in English during the year.

The union was instrumental in introducing the Jewish Chautauqua movement into England. It arranged with considerable success summer gatherings at English seaside resorts.
