= Palestine: A Policy =

1942 book by Albert Montefiore Hyamson

- Title page of 1942 edition of the book
- Author: Albert Montefiore Hyamson
- Original title: Palestine: A Policy
- Language: English
- Subject: Zionism - History, Mandates - Palestine, Jews - Palestine
- Genre: History
- Published: 1942 Methuen & co., ltd.
- Publication place: UK
- Media type: Print
- Pages: 214
- ISBN: 0883553252
- OCLC: 3068318
- Dewey Decimal: 296.09569
- LC Class: DS149 .H83

Palestine: A Policy is a history book by British civil servant and historian, Albert Montefiore Hyamson, which provides a history of the idea and practise of Zionism from the Eighteenth Century and the British Mandate for Palestine until 1942.

== Background ==
In 1937, against the background of the deliberations and findings of the Peel Commission, Hyamson wrote a number of letters to the editor of The Times newspaper. The first, in May, said that partition of Palestine was a bad idea and would mark a surrender to extremists on both sides. He wrote that partition would destroy the ideal of a Palestinian state with Jewish and Arab citizens living together, and lead to the creation of two mutually hostile countries that would require the British army to keep the peace between them. Hyamson's alternative was of 'the ideal of a united Palestine, with Jewish and Arab citizens all civilly and politically equal and free', organised under a system similar to the Ottoman millet approach where all communities would be given the widest possible autonomy in all matters. His second letter, written in July, entreated the British government to postpone partition while the moderate Jews and Arabs came to a measure of cooperation.

In August he wrote to point out that it was the Jewish Agency and rather than the World Zionist Organization that could properly claim to represent the Jews of Palestine. Further, he believed that proposals for a hundred thousand Jewish immigrants per year would make the country impossibly crowded. Finally, in October he wrote to say partition was unpopular and should be avoided. He wrote another letter in April 1938 reflecting on the vote in the House of Commons to extend Palestinian citizenship to Jewish sufferers of Nazi oppression in Europe could only remain a gesture of sympathy, but remained impossible in practise and that it might be seen as a threat by Palestinian Arabs.

In the early and mid 1940s Hyamson promoted the bi-nationalism of Judah L Magnes whenever he could. He collaborated with Norman Bentwich and others in 1943 to distribute a pamphlet on the policy by Magnes. In an article published in The Contemporary Review in 1945 he set forth his reasons for supporting bi-nationalism (as the best compromise between either Zionist or Arab dominance of Palestine), which he reiterated in a letter to The Jewish Chronicle in 1946. Hyamson also wrote a number of articles supporting Magnes in The Jewish Outlook, the journal of the Jewish Fellowship.

Prior to the publication of Palestine: A Policy, Hyamson was apparently worried by the Zionist reaction within the Jewish community and wrote to his friend Sir Ronald Storrs that he believed he would be 'in for a bout of persecution' on account of the book. He also asked Storrs, who wrote the foreword to the book, if he wouldn't mind toning down his comments as he was facing enough pressure without Storrs’ contribution adding to this. Storrs’s introduction likened Hyamson’s book to Norman Bentwich’s Wanderer Between Two Worlds for its ability to explain Jews and Zionism to Gentiles and its ability to see both sides of the argument. He also mentions that Hyamson’s dispassionate analysis might be taken as betrayal by more extreme Zionists. However, Storrs believes it would be a strange paradox if territorial Zionism overcame spiritual Zionism. After recapping a few of Hyamson’s main points (including that Hyamson would consider himself a Zionist), he concludes that few people would disagree that Arabs would benefit from Jewish cooperation and prosperity, and the book may be a step towards that understanding.

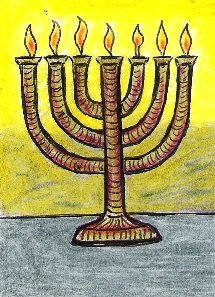
"One can be a Zionist without being a nationalist, even an unaggressive one. The earlier Zionism, that which has had a far longer career than the Neo-Zionism of to-day, was none the less Zionist, even though it had no tinge of nationalism in the modern semi-aggressive sense. That Zionism was not based on a Jewish nation, whose existence in the modern sense it did not admit, but on the Jewish people."(from Hyamson's preface to Palestine: A Policy (pps. xi and xii))

== Synopsis ==
In his preface, Hyamson states that he is a spiritual Zionist, rather than a nationalist, or political Zionist. In his first chapter, The Jew and the Mission of Israel, he makes a distinction between Jews who are of the Jewish religion, Hebrews who are of the Jewish race, and Israelites who are a member of the Jewish community or nationality. The Mission of the Jews is the main justification of the survival of the Jews (i.e. the religion), to be "priests and a holy nation", which is a purely religious vocation. To avoid assimilation all Jews who want Jewry to survive must be Zionists. The following four chapters give a history of different forms of Zionism, usually as to how it relates to England. Starting with messianic Zionism which is often millenarian and played a role in Oliver Cromwell’s resettlement of the Jews in England. He then looks at British advocates for Zionism, largely Christian, who he points out didn’t usually envision a Jewish state. In a chapter titled Practical Zionism he gives a history of the previous 200 years of Jewish settlement in Palestine. Political Zionism looks at Theodor Hertzl and the Zionist organisation, and makes the point that Political Zionism which needs a Jewish state is ultimately assimilationist. The following five chapters look at recent British involvement in Palestine, starting with the Balfour Declaration and finishing shortly after the White Paper of 1939. It is clear that his sympathies lie with practical Zionists (those who would settle in Palestine), but not political Zionists (who wanted a Jewish state). Whenever he talks of Jewish immigration to Palestine, he links it to the ‘economic absorptive capacity’ of the country.

In the final chapter, The Next Step, Hyamson lays out a solution to the issues faced by Palestine in 1942. After pointing out that the situation seems to be insoluble, he writes that it must be possible for both Jews and Arabs to live together with their ambitions for "individual freedom and communal or national liberty"(and more specifically, providing a National Home for Jews and freedom from domination by others for Arabs) being met. To achieve this, the idea of specifically Arab and Jewish states must be abandoned. A system like the Swiss cantons, or the United Kingdom with specific community laws and protections for minorities should be adopted. Weizmann wanted this in 1919, and similar schemes were also proposed by General Nuri el Said and George Antonius. Such an arrangement would be the true successor the Council of the Four Lands and the Lithuanian Council. Further, Palestine, even if the majority of the population were Jewish, would have to be part of a Greater Syria. In this manner conflict between Jews and Arabs could be overcome and we could see mutual cooperation like in the Arab Golden Age.

== Reception and later writing ==
Foreign Affairs magazine gave the book a short review, calling it "one of the more sensible and objective books on the "too much promised land," by a non-Zionist Jew".

In June 1946 Hyamson added his name to a letter to The Times with a number of Indian Civil Servants to say that the situation in Palestine and the possibility of reconciliation between Jew and Arab had been made more difficult by the conclusions of the Anglo-American Committee of Inquiry. They proposed self-government for all Palestinians, Jew and Arab, within a single state before goodwill is established between the parties. Once the status of each community was assured, cooperation would follow. Practical efforts should be made along the lines of the Cabinet Mission to India, which they say worked in a vastly more complicated situation. In April 1948 he wrote his final letter to The Times which called for a bi-national or federal solution to the situation in Palestine.

In 1950 Hyamson published his final book on the issue of Palestine in Palestine under the Mandate, 1920-1948. The book included a chapter on the eviction of Arab tenant farmers from lands sold by absentee Arab landlords to Jewish agencies from the 1920s.
