= John Bertram Askew =

British writer and translator

John Bertram Askew (16 October 1869 – 5 February 1929) was a British writer and translator, who translated some of the work of Karl Kautsky from German to English.

== Life ==
Askew was born in Edinburgh, Scotland, to English parents Watson Askew, from Buckland, Portsmouth, and Sarah Robertson, from London. He was educated at Eton and Christ Church, Oxford. "It was difficult from his own vague allusions in latter years to imagine in what orgy of extravagance this mild, scholarly person might have dissipated his youthful fortunes and become estranged from his family." In 1896, he published Pros and Cons, a compilation of views on both sides of topical political controversies, which went through several editions. Becoming a socialist, he went to live in Germany, where he knew Friedrich Engels. Trotsky's life of Lenin mentions him as a London associate.

Askew separated from his first wife, and in June 1911 a German court ruled that the marriage was dissolved. On 24 April 1912, he married his second wife, Anna Wengels, from Berlin.

Askew died in Moscow. After his death, the legitimacy of his second marriage was debated as a question of the conflict of laws in British courts.

== Works ==
=== Translations ===
- The Social Revolution and, On the Morrow of the Social Revolution by Karl Kautsky. London: Twentieth Century Press, 1903.
- Ethics and the materialist conception of history by Karl Kautsky. Chicago: C. H. Kerr & Co.

=== Other ===
- Pros and cons: A newspaper reader's and debater's guide to the leading controversies of the day (political, social, religions, etc.), London: Swan Sonnenschein & Co., Limited, 1896.
- Der britische Imperialismus, Stuttgart: Dietz, 1914
