= Faisal–Weizmann agreement =

1919 agreement

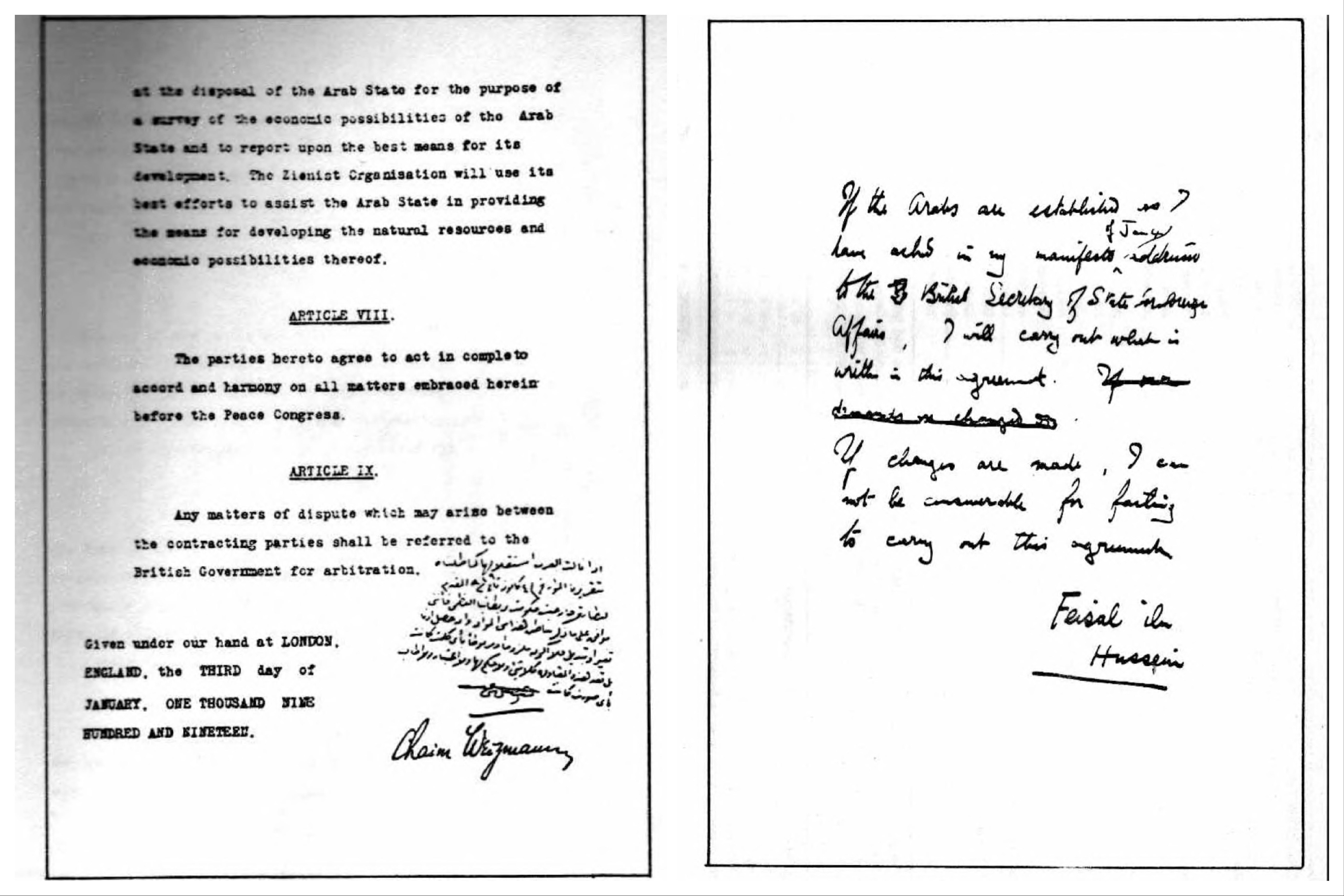
Signature page of the agreement, showing Faisal's caveat in Arabic, and T. E. Lawrence's appended translation of the caveat (Faisal could not read or write English).

The Faisal–Weizmann agreement was signed by Emir Faisal, the third son of Hussein ibn Ali al-Hashimi, King of the short-lived Kingdom of Hejaz, and Chaim Weizmann, President of the Zionist Organization on 3 January 1919. Signed two weeks before the start of the Paris Peace Conference, it was presented by the Zionist delegation alongside a March 1919 letter written by T. E. Lawrence in Faisal's name to American Zionist leader Felix Frankfurter as two documents to argue that the Zionist plans for Palestine had prior approval of Arabs.

The agreement was presented to Faisal in his room at the Carlton Hotel on 3 January in English, which Faisal could not read, and its contents were translated and explained to Faisal by Lawrence. Faisal signed the document in the same meeting, without consulting his advisors awaiting him in a separate room, but added a caveat in Arabic next to his signature, such that Faisal considered the agreement as conditional on Palestine being within the area of Arab independence. (Note: Ali Allawi explained this as follows: "When Faisal left the meeting with Weizmann to explain his actions to his advisers who were in a nearby suite of offices at the Carlton Hotel, he was met with expressions of shock and disbelief. How could he sign a document that was written by a foreigner in favour of another foreigner in English in a language of which he knew nothing? Faisal replied to his advisers as recorded in 'Awni 'Abd al-Hadi's memoirs, "You are right to be surprised that I signed such an agreement written in English. But I warrant you that your surprise will disappear when I tell you that I did not sign the agreement before I stipulated in writing that my agreement to sign it was conditional on the acceptance by the British government of a previous note that I had presented to the Foreign Office... [This note] contained the demand for the independence of the Arab lands in Asia, starting from a line that begins in the north at Alexandretta-Diyarbakir and reaching the Indian Ocean in the south. And Palestine, as you know, is within these boundaries... I confirmed in this agreement before signing that I am not responsible for the implementation of anything in the agreement if any modification to my note is allowed"") The Zionist Organization submitted the agreement to the Paris Peace Conference without the caveat.

Israeli historian Yoav Gelber described the agreement as "of propaganda value only", since it quickly became clear that Faisal's conditions would not be met.

== Background: status of Palestine ==
At the time the agreement was made, there had preceded it (apart from the Balfour Declaration) the McMahon–Hussein Correspondence, the Sykes–Picot Agreement, the Hogarth message, the Bassett Letter, the Declaration to the Seven and the Anglo-French Declaration. Of these, the Sykes–Picot Agreement had been made public by the Bolsheviks and the Declaration to the Seven as well as the Anglo-French Declaration were also public documents. The Sykes–Picot Agreement had called for an "Arab State or a Confederation of Arab States ... under the suzerainty of an Arab chief". The French and British also proposed an international administration in the "brown area" (an area including Jerusalem, similar to and smaller than Mandate Palestine), the form of which was to be decided upon after consultation with Russia, and subsequently in consultation with the other Allies, "and the representatives of the Shereef of Mecca".

Henry McMahon had exchanged letters with Faisal's father Hussein bin Ali, Sharif of Mecca in 1915, in which he had promised Hussein control of Arab lands with the exception of "portions of Syria" lying to the west of "the districts of Damascus, Homs, Hama and Aleppo". Palestine lies to the southwest of these areas and wasn't explicitly mentioned. That modern-day Lebanese region of the Mediterranean coast was set aside as part of a future French Mandate. After the war the extent of the coastal exclusion was hotly disputed. Hussein had protested that the Arabs of Beirut would greatly oppose isolation from the Arab state or states, but did not bring up the matter of Jerusalem or Palestine. Between 1916 and 1920, the British government interpreted these commitments as including Palestine in the Arab area. However, in the 1922 Churchill White Paper they argued instead that Palestine had been excluded. (Note: Lord Grey had been the foreign secretary during the McMahon-Hussein negotiations. Speaking in the House of Lords on 27 March 1923, he made it clear that he entertained serious doubts as to the validity of the British government's interpretation of the pledges which he, as foreign secretary, had caused to be given to Hussein in 1915. He called for all of the secret engagements regarding Palestine to be made public. Many of the relevant documents in the National Archives were later declassified and published. Among them were the minutes of a Cabinet Eastern Committee meeting, chaired by Lord Curzon, which was held on 5 December 1918. Balfour was in attendance. The minutes revealed that in laying out the government's position Curzon had explained that: "Palestine was included in the areas as to which Great Britain pledged itself that they should be Arab and independent in the future".)

On the basis of McMahon's assurances the Arab Revolt began on 5 June 1916. However, the British and French also secretly concluded the Sykes–Picot Agreement on 16 May 1916. This agreement divided many Arab territories into British- and French-administered areas and allowed for the internationalisation of Palestine. Hussein learned of the agreement when it was leaked by the new Russian government in December 1917, but was satisfied by two disingenuous telegrams from Sir Reginald Wingate, High Commissioner of Egypt, assuring him that the British government's commitments to the Arabs were still valid and that the Sykes–Picot Agreement was not a formal treaty.

Following the publication of the Balfour Declaration the British had dispatched Commander David George Hogarth to see Hussein in January 1918 bearing the message that the "political and economic freedom" of the Palestinian population was not in question. Hogarth reported that Hussein "would not accept an independent Jewish State in Palestine, nor was I instructed to warn him that such a state was contemplated by Great Britain". According to Isaiah Friedman, Hussein was not perturbed by the Balfour Declaration and on 23 March 1918, in Al Qibla, the daily newspaper of Mecca, attested that Palestine was "a sacred and beloved homeland of its original sons", the Jews; "the return of these exiles to their homeland will prove materially and spiritually an experimental school for their [Arab] brethren." He called on the Arab population in Palestine to welcome the Jews as brethren and cooperate with them for the common welfare. Whereas Kedourie (as well as Friedman) have argued that Hussein accepted the Balfour Declaration, Charles D.Smith has argued that both Friedman and Kedourie misrepresent documents and violate scholarly standards in order to reach their conclusions. while Schneer says that historians have spilled oceans of ink tracing the initial reactions of Hussein and his sons to the Balfour Declaration without settling the debate, noting that Hussein considered Palestine to be Arab land.

Continuing Arab disquiet over Allied intentions also led during 1918 to the British Declaration to the Seven and the Anglo-French Declaration, the latter promising "the complete and final liberation of the peoples who have for so long been oppressed by the Turks, and the setting up of national governments and administrations deriving their authority from the free exercise of the initiative and choice of the indigenous populations".

== Prelude to the agreement ==
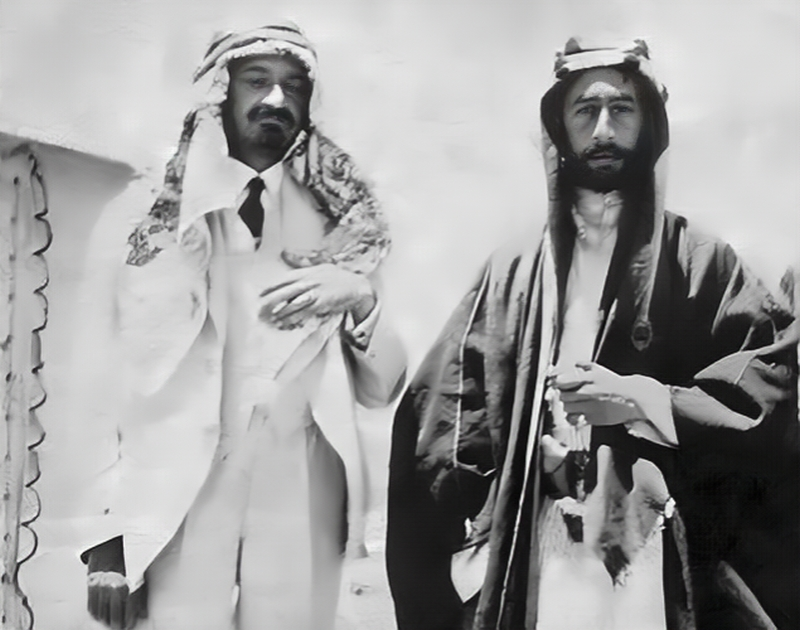
Emir Faisal I and Chaim Weizmann (left, wearing Arab headdress as a sign of friendship) in 1918 in Transjordan

Weizmann first met Faisal in June 1918, (Note: In preparation for the meeting British diplomat Mark Sykes, expressing "entrenched pre-conceptions about the Jews" common in his time among the English elite, had written to Faisal about the Jewish people: "I know that the Arabs despise, condemn, and hate the Jews" but he added "I speak the truth when I say that this race, despised and weak, is universal, is all-powerful and cannot be put down" and he suggested that Faisal view the Jews as a powerful ally.) during the British advance from the South against the Ottoman Empire in World War I. As leader of an impromptu "Zionist Commission", Weizmann traveled to southern Transjordan for the meeting. Weizmann had assured Faisal that "the Jews did not propose to set up a government of their own but wished to work under British protection, to colonize and develop Palestine without encroaching on any legitimate interests". Antonius commented in 1938 that: "The combined effect of those assurances had been to induce in him a belief that there was nothing either in the Zionist aspirations as such or in the policy professed by the British Government in regard to their fulfilment that would interfere with Arab political and economic freedom in Palestine".

Weizmann's intended purpose was to forge an agreement between Faisal and the Zionist movement to support an Arab Kingdom and Jewish settlement in Palestine, respectively. The wishes of the Palestinian Arabs were to be ignored, and, indeed, both men seem to have held the Palestinian Arabs in considerable disdain. (Note: Weizmann had called them "treacherous", "arrogant", "uneducated", and "greedy" and had complained to the British that the system in Palestine did "not take into account the fact that there is a fundamental qualitative difference between Jew and Arab". After his meeting with Faisal, Weizmann allegedly reported that Faisal was "contemptuous of the Palestinian Arabs whom he doesn't even regard as Arabs".) In the event, Weizmann and Faisal established an informal agreement under which Faisal would support close Jewish settlement in Palestine while the Zionist movement would assist in the development of the vast Arab nation that Faisal hoped to establish.

After concerns were expressed by Cecil regarding draft proposals put forward by the Advisory Committee on Palestine (chaired by Herbert Samuel), Balfour suggested to Weizmann that "it would be very helpful indeed if the Zionists and Feisal could act unitedly and reach an agreement on certain points of possible conflict." Weizmann and Faisal met again on 11 December 1918, while both were in London preparing their statements for the upcoming peace conference in Paris.

Three weeks prior to signing the agreement, on 12 December 1918, Faisal was quoted in The Times, in a piece which Ali Allawi writes was "no doubt instigated by Lawrence and the Foreign Office":

The two main branches of the Semitic family, Arabs and Jews, understand one another, and I hope that as a result of interchange of ideas at the Peace Conference, which will be guided by ideals of self-determination and nationality, each nation will make definite progress towards the realization of its aspirations. Arabs are not jealous of Zionist Jews, and intend to give them fair play and the Zionist Jews have assured the Nationalist Arabs of their intention to see that they too have fair play in their respective areas. Turkish intrigue in Palestine has raised jealousy between the Jewish colonists and the local peasants, but the mutual understanding of the aims of Arabs and Jews will at once clear away the last trace of this former bitterness, which, indeed, had already practically disappeared before the war by the work of the Arab Secret Revolutionary Committee, which in Syria and elsewhere laid the foundation of the Arab military successes of the past two years.

Two days prior to the agreement, on 1 January 1919, Faisal's delegation submitted a statement to the Peace Conference, and a further memorandum was submitted on 29 January. The statement referred to the goal to "unite the Arabs eventually into one nation", defining the Arab areas as "from a line Alexandretta – Persia southward to the Indian Ocean" (1 January) or "from the line Alexandretta – Diarbekr southward to the Indian Ocean" (29 January). The latter memorandum described boundaries of any new states as "matters for arrangement between us, after the wishes of their respective inhabitants have been ascertained" in a reference to US President Woodrow Wilson's policy of self determination.

== Signing ==
They signed the written agreement, which bears their names, on 3 January 1919. (Note: Sicker says the agreement was signed on 4 January) Faisal was not explicitly authorised by his father to enter into such an agreement, with his instructions from his father limited to the requirement that he accept only fulfilment of the previous British promises for Arab independence; (Note: George Antonius described this as follows:"Faisal found himself placed in a difficult position. The proposals which his friends in Whitehall were pressing him to endorse were not only extraneous to the terms of his mission, which amounted to a few lines of summary instructions issued by his father, but also in conflict with the general and somewhat inflamed feeling in the northern Arab countries. He tried to obtain specific directions from King Husain, but all he could elicit from his autocratic and single-minded father was an order to accept nothing less than the fulfilment of the pledges made by Great Britain with regard to Arab independence. The order gave him no latitude whatever... He felt keenly the insufficiency of his equipment, his ignorance of English, his unfamiliarity with the methods of European diplomacy, and, above all, the limitations imposed upon his usefulness by his father’s refusal to grant him full powers.) the caveat was added as a result. The next day, Weizmann arrived in Paris to head the Zionist delegation to the Peace Conference. (Note: It was a triumphal moment for Weizmann; it was an accord that climaxed years of negotiations and ceaseless shuttles between the Middle East and the capitals of Western Europe and that promised to usher in an era of peace and cooperation between the two principal ethnic groups of Palestine: Arabs and Jews.)

=== Text of the agreement ===
Agreement Between Emir Feisal and Dr. Weizmann

3 January 1919

His Royal Highness the Emir Feisal, representing and acting on behalf of the Arab Kingdom of Hedjaz, and Dr. Chaim Weizmann, representing and acting on behalf of the Zionist Organization, mindful of the racial kinship and ancient bonds existing between the Arabs and the Jewish people, and realizing that the surest means of working out the consummation of their natural aspirations is through the closest possible collaboration in the development of the Arab State and Palestine, and being desirous further of confirming the good understanding which exists between them, have agreed upon the following:

Articles: (Note: Article I; The Arab State and Palestine in all their relations and undertakings shall be controlled by the most cordial goodwill and understanding, and to this end Arab and Jewish duly accredited agents shall be established and maintained in the respective territories.: Article II; Immediately following the completion of the deliberations of the Peace Conference, the definite boundaries between the Arab State and Palestine shall be determined by a Commission to be agreed upon by the parties hereto.: Article III; In the establishment of the Constitution and Administration of Palestine, all such measures shall be adopted as will afford the fullest guarantees for carrying into effect the British Government's Declaration of the 2nd of November, 1917.: Article IV; All necessary measures shall be taken to encourage and stimulate immigration of Jews into Palestine on a large scale, and as quickly as possible to settle Jewish immigrants upon the land through closer settlement and intensive cultivation of the soil. In taking such measures the Arab peasant and tenant farmers shall be protected in their rights and shall be assisted in forwarding their economic development.: Article V; No regulation or law shall be made prohibiting or interfering in any way with the free exercise of religion; and further, the free exercise and enjoyment of religious profession and worship, without discrimination or preference, shall forever be allowed. No religious test shall ever be required for the exercise of civil or political rights.: Article VI; The Mohammedan Holy Places shall be under Mohammedan control.: Article VII; The Zionist Organization proposes to send to Palestine a Commission of experts to make a survey of the economic possibilities of the country, and to report upon the best means for its development. The Zionist Organization will place the aforementioned Commission at the disposal of the Arab State for the purpose of a survey of the economic possibilities of the Arab State and to report upon the best means for its development. The Zionist Organization will use its best efforts to assist the Arab State in providing the means for developing the natural resources and economic possibilities thereof.: Article VIII; The parties hereto agree to act in complete accord and harmony on all matters embraced herein before the Peace Congress.: Article IX; Any matters of dispute which may arise between the contracting parties hall be referred to the British Government for arbitration.)

Given under our hand at London, England, the third day of January, one thousand nine hundred and nineteen

Chaim Weizmann Feisal Ibn-Hussein (Note: Reservation by the Emir Feisal If the Arabs are established as I have asked in my manifesto of 4 January, addressed to the British Secretary of State for Foreign Affairs, I will carry out what is written in this agreement. If changes are made, I cannot be answerable for failing to carry out this agreement.)

=== Main points of the agreement ===
- The agreement committed both parties to conducting all relations between the groups by the most cordial goodwill and understanding, to work together to encourage immigration of Jews into Palestine on a large scale while protecting the rights of the Arab peasants and tenant farmers, and to safeguard the free practice of religious observances. The Muslim Holy Places were to be under Muslim control.
- The Zionist movement undertook to assist the Arab residents of Palestine and the future Arab state to develop their natural resources and establish a growing economy.
- The boundaries between an Arab State and Palestine should be determined by a Commission after the Paris Peace Conference.
- The parties committed to carrying into effect the Balfour Declaration of 1917, calling for a Jewish national home in Palestine.
- Disputes were to be submitted to the British Government for arbitration.

Weizmann signed the agreement on behalf of the Zionist Organization, while Faisal signed on behalf of the short-lived Arab Kingdom of Hedjaz.

=== Faisal's caveat ===
Faisal conditioned his acceptance on the fulfillment of British wartime promises to the Arabs, who had hoped for independence in a vast part of the Ottoman Empire. He appended to the typed document a hand-written statement, next to which Lawrence added a slightly inaccurate translation:

Text of the caveat
Original Arabic	Literal translation (Professor Philip K. Hitti, 1943)	T. E. Lawrence's translation (appended to the original document)
إذا نالت العرب استقلالها كما طلبناه بتقريرنا المؤرخ في 4 كانون الثاني يناير سنة 1919 المقدم لنظارة خارجية حكومة بريطانيا العظمى فإنني موافق على ما ذكرنا في هذا من المواد وإن حصل أدنى تغيير أو تبديل فلا أكون ملزوماً ومربوطاً بأي كلمة كانت بل تعد هذه الوثيقة كلا شيء ولا حكم لها ولا اعتبار ولا أطالب بأي صورة كانت	Provided the Arabs obtain their independence as demanded in my Memorandum dated the 4th of January 1919, to the Foreign Office of the Government of Great Britain, I shall concur in the above articles. But if the slightest modification or departure were to be made [sc. in relation to the demands of the memorandum] I shall not then be bound by a single word of the present agreement which shall be deemed void and of no account or validity, and I shall not be answerable in any way whatsoever.	If the Arabs are established as I have asked in my manifesto of Jan 4, addressed to the British Secretary of State for Foreign Affairs, I will carry out what is written in this agreement. If changes are made, I cannot be answerable for failing to carry out this agreement.

The date of 4 January referred to in the caveat is either a mistake or refers to a document unknown to historians. Allawi interprets Faisal as referring to his memorandum submitted on 1 January.

== Subsequent discussions ==
=== Paris Peace Conference ===
Faisal submitted his written proposals to the Conference on 27 January. A draft memorandum that Lawrence had brought at Faisal's request to Stephen Bonsal of the American delegation shortly after the Zionists had made their initial presentation, according to Bonsal's memoirs, stated very different views from the agreement with Weizmann:

If the views of the radical Zionists, as presented to the Peace Conference, should prevail, the result will be a ferment, chronic unrest, and sooner or later civil war in Palestine. But I hope I will not be misunderstood. I assert that we Arabs have none of the racial or religious animosity against the Jews which unfortunately prevail in many other regions of the world. I assert that with the Jews who have been seated for some generations in Palestine our relations are excellent. But the new arrivals exhibit very different qualities from those "old settlers" as we call them, with whom we have been able to live and even co-operate on friendly terms. For want of a better word I must say that new colonists almost without exception have come in an imperialistic spirit. They say that too long we have been in control of their homeland taken from them by brute force in the Dark Ages, but that now under the new world order we must clear out; and if we are wise we should do so peaceably without making any resistance to what is the fiat of the civilised world.

Faisal made his appearance before the Supreme Council on 6 February and, in a further sign that his Zionist sympathy might be wavering, suggested that "Palestine, in consequence of its universal character, be left on one side for the mutual consideration of all parties concerned".

The Zionists written submission was made on 3 February with their appearance before the Supreme Council on 27 February.

=== Le Matin interview ===
A 1 March interview by Le Matin quoted Faisal as saying:

This feeling of respect for other religions dictates my opinion about Palestine, our neighbor. That the unhappy Jews come to reside there and behave as good citizens of this country, our humanity rejoices given that they are placed under a Muslim or Christian government mandated by The League of Nations. If they want to constitute a state and claim sovereign rights in this region, I foresee very serious dangers. It is to be feared that there will be a conflict between them and the other races. (Note: Ce sentiment de respect pour les autres religions dicte mon opinion touchant la Palestine, notre voisine. Que les juifs malheureux viennent s'y refugieret se comportent en bons citoyens de ce pays, notre humanite s'en rejouit mais quells soient places sous un gouverment musulman ou chretien mandate par La Societe des nations. S’ils veulent constituer un Etat et revendiquer des droits souveraigns dans cette region je prevois de tres graves dangers. Il est a craindre qu’il y ait conflit entre eux et les autres races.)

=== Frankfurter correspondence ===
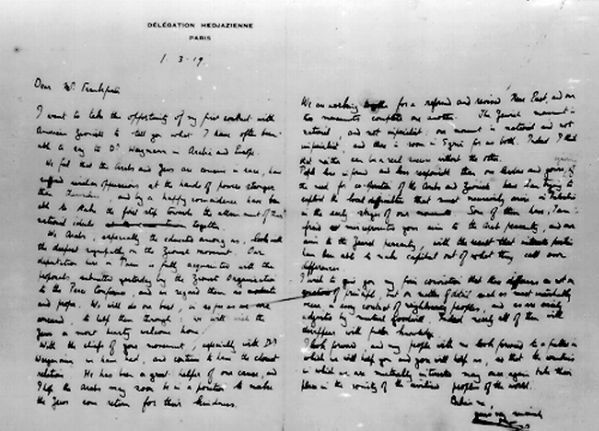
Letter to Felix Frankfurter written by T. E. Lawrence in the name of Prince Faisal, March 1919

Although Allawi states that Faisal had been misquoted he says that the Le Matin interview resulted in difficulties with the Zionists leading to a meeting between Faisal and Frankfurter followed by Lawrence drafting of a letter to Felix Frankfurter, President of the Zionist Organization of America, on 3 March 1919, signed by Faisal:

"The Arabs, especially the educated among us, look with the deepest sympathy on the Zionist movement. Our deputation here in Paris is fully acquainted with the proposals (Note: Part of the proposals submitted by the Zionist Organization to the Peace Conference on 3 February were: "The boundaries of Palestine shall follow the general lines set out below: Starting on the North at a point on the Mediterranean Sea in the vicinity South of Sidon and following the watersheds of the foothills of the Lebanon as far as Jisr el Karaon, thence to El Bire following the dividing line between the two basins of the Wadi El Korn and the Wadi Et Teim thence in a southerly direction following the dividing line between the Eastern and Western slopes of the Hermon, to the vicinity West of Beit Jenn, thence Eastward following the northern watersheds of the Nahr Mughaniye close to and west of the Hedjaz Railway. In the East a line close to and West of the Hedjaz Railway terminating in the Gulf of Akaba. In the South a frontier to be agreed upon with the Egyptian Government. In the West the Mediterranean Sea. The details of the delimitations, or any necessary adjustments of detail, shall be settled by a Special Commission on which there shall be Jewish representation.") submitted yesterday by the Zionist Organization to the Peace Conference, and we regard them as moderate and proper."

Frankfurter replied on 5 March "..These aims are now before the Peace Conference as definite proposals by the Zionist Organisation. We are happy indeed that you consider these proposals 'moderate and proper,' and that we have in you a staunch supporter for their realisation."

==== Controversy ====
When the letter was tabled at the Shaw Commission in 1929, Rustam Haidar spoke to Faisal in Baghdad and cabled that Faisal had "no recollection that he wrote anything of the sort". In January 1930, Haidar wrote to a newspaper in Baghdad that Faisal: "finds it exceedingly strange that such a matter is attributed to him as he at no time would consider allowing any foreign nation to share in an Arab country". Awni Abd al-Hadi, Faisal's secretary, wrote in his memoirs that he was not aware that a meeting between Frankfurter and Faisal took place and that: "I believe that this letter, assuming that it is authentic, was written by Lawrence, and that Lawrence signed it in English on behalf of Faisal. I believe this letter is part of the false claims made by Chaim Weizmann and Lawrence to lead astray public opinion." According to Allawi, the most likely explanation for the Frankfurter letter is that a meeting took place, a letter was drafted in English by Lawrence, but that its "contents were not entirely made clear to Faisal. He then may or may not have been induced to sign it", since it ran counter to Faisal's other public and private statements at the time.

Mack notes that Frankfurter reprinted the letter in the October 1930 issue of The Atlantic Monthly, vouched for its authenticity, commenting "Prince Feisal's letter was a document prepared under the most responsible conditions" and that although Faisal objected to interpretations that understood his letter to mean consent to Zionist policy, he did not disavow its authorship.

== Failure of the agreement ==
=== Syrian National Congress and Kingdom of Syria ===
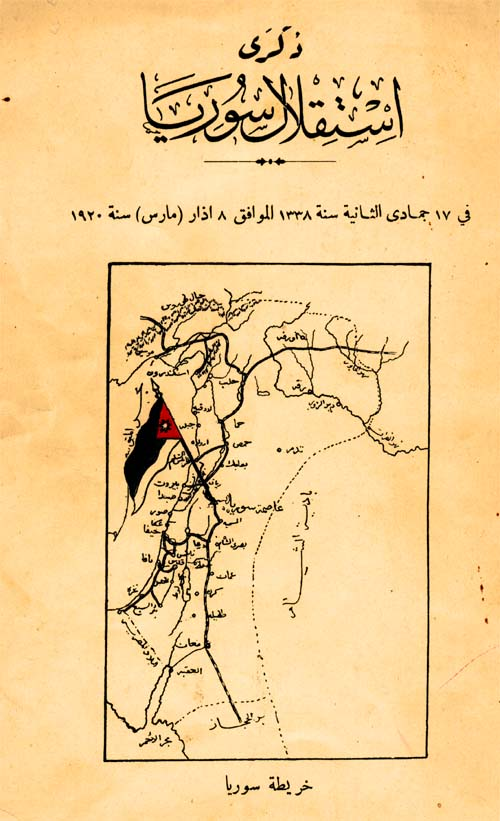
Book of the Independence of Syria, 8 March 1920, showing the declared borders of Faisal's Arab Kingdom of Syria, including Palestine.

In October 1918, British and Arab forces had captured Damascus during the Arab Revolt and Faisal formed a government. In May 1919, elections were held for the Syrian National Congress. On 2 July 1919 the Congress in a memorandum presented to the King-Crane Commission completely opposed any migration to Palestine and the latter not to be separated from Syria. (Note: The text was published in the Arab press at the time. George Antonius's translation in 1938 included Article 7 as follows: "We reject the claims of Zionists for the establishment of a Jewish commonwealth in that part of southern Syria which is known as Palestine and we are opposed to Jewish immigration into any part of the country. We do not acknowledge that they have a title, and we regard their claims as a grave menace to our national, political, and economic life. Our Jewish fellow-citizens shall continue to enjoy the rights and to bear the responsibilities which are ours in common.") According to C.D. Smith, the Syrian National Congress had forced Faisal to back away from his tentative support of Zionist goals. At this point, the agreement could be seen as a dead letter. On 7 March 1920, Faisal was proclaimed King of Arab Kingdom of Syria (Greater Syria).

In April 1920, the San Remo conference gave France the mandate for Syria, which led to the Franco-Syrian War. In the Battle of Maysalun on 24 July 1920, the French were victorious and Faisal was expelled from Syria after which he contended that the conditions he appended were not fulfilled and the agreement therefore moot. According to contemporaries, including Gertrude Bell and Lawrence, the French, with British support, betrayed Faisal and the Arab cause rendering the treaty invalid.

=== Hussein's views ===
St. John Philby, a British representative in Palestine, later stated that Hussein bin Ali, the Sharif of Mecca and King of Hejaz, on whose behalf Faisal was acting, had refused to recognize the agreement as soon as it was brought to his notice.

== Disclosure of the agreement ==
The agreement was first disclosed to the public in 1936.

It was noted by UNSCOP that "To many observers at the time, conclusion of the Feisal-Weizmann agreement promised well for the future co-operation of Arab and Jew in Palestine", and further referring to the 1937 report of the Palestine Royal Commission which noted that "Not once since 1919 had any Arab leader said that co-operation with the Jews was even possible" despite expressed hopes to the contrary by British and Zionist representatives. UNSCOP did not regard the agreement as ever being valid, although Weizmann asserted that the treaty should be considered valid (Note: "A postscript was also included in this treaty. This postscript relates to a reservation by King Feisal that he would carry out all the promises in this treaty if and when he would obtain his demands, namely, independence for the Arab countries. I submit that these requirements of King Feisal have at present been realized. The Arab countries are all independent, and therefore the condition on which depended the fulfillment of this treaty, has come into effect. Therefore, this treaty, to all intents and purposes, should today be a valid document".) while at the same time agreeing that Faisal had the right to void it after losing Syria to the French. (Note: Mr. WEIZMANN: Yes, the promises were not carried out at the time. He was expelled from Syria, he had to go to Iraq. What I contend now is that the Arabs have obtained all the independence they had been claiming under Feisal. CHAIRMAN: I should like to ask you the question whether Emir Feisal, after he had been driven out from Damascus, was entitled to consider the agreement made with you as void? Mr. WEIZMANN: I think he was. I think he was, and this agreement was never pressed.)

== See also ==
- Israeli–Palestinian peace process
- List of Middle East peace proposals
- Projects working for peace among Israelis and Arabs
