= Declaration to the Seven =

Document published in 1918

The Declaration to the Seven was a document written by Sir Mark Sykes, approved by Charles Hardinge, the Permanent Under-Secretary at the Foreign Office and released on June 16, 1918, in response to a memorandum issued anonymously by seven Syrian notables in Cairo that included members of the soon to be formed Syrian Unity Party, established in the wake of the Balfour Declaration and the November 23, 1917, publication by the Bolsheviks of the secret May 1916 Sykes–Picot Agreement between Britain and France. The memorandum requested a "guarantee of the ultimate independence of Arabia". The Declaration stated the British policy that the future government of the regions of the Ottoman Empire occupied by Allies of World War I "should be based upon the principle of the consent of the governed".

== Significance of the Declaration ==
The Declaration to the Seven is notable as the first British pronouncement to the Arabs advancing the principle of national self-determination. Although the British sought to secure their position by adopting the Wilsonian doctrine of Woodrow Wilson, neither Britain nor France was prepared to implement their promises to the Arabs nor to abdicate the position won by victory over the Ottoman Empire.

The document was not widely publicised. The Declaration may explain the action of General Edmund Allenby, who ordered a halt to the advance after the rout of Turkish forces outside Damascus and allowed the city to be captured by Arab forces in September 1918 after the Battle of Megiddo acting on instructions from London, thus bolstering the Arab claim to the independence of Syria whilst simultaneously undermining the French claims to the territory under the terms of the Sykes–Picot Agreement.

== The Seven ==
- Rafiq al-Azm;
- Sheikh Kamal al-Qassab;
- Mukhtar al-Sulh;
- Abdul Rahman Shahbandar;
- Khaled al-Hakim;
- Fauzi al-Bakri (brother of Nasib al-Bakri, both members of Al-Fatat);
- Hasan Himadeh.

== See also ==
- Damascus Protocol
- McMahon–Hussein correspondence
- Anglo-French Declaration
