= Hogarth Message =

1918 diplomatic letter

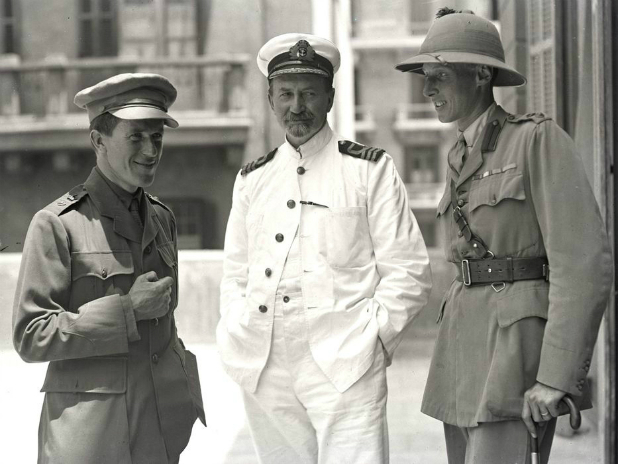
T. E. Lawrence; D. G. Hogarth; Lt. Col. Dawnay

The Hogarth Message was a January 1918 message from Commander David Hogarth, head of the Arab Bureau in Cairo, to Hussein bin Ali, Sharif of Mecca, following Hussein's request for an explanation of the Balfour Declaration.

Hogarth was dispatched to Jeddah to deliver the letter, which had been written by Sir Mark Sykes on behalf of the British Government.

== The message ==
The message assured Hussein that

"(1) The Entente Powers are determined that the Arab race shall be given full opportunity of once again forming a nation in the world. This can only be achieved by the Arabs themselves uniting, and Great Britain and her Allies will pursue a policy with this ultimate unity in view.

"(2) So far as Palestine is concerned we are determined that no people shall be subject to another, but

(a) In view of the fact that there are in Palestine shrines, Wakfs and Holy places, sacred in some cases to Moslems alone, to Jews alone, to Christians alone, and in others to two or all three, and inasmuch as these places are of interest to vast masses of people outside Palestine and Arabia, there must be a special regime to deal with these places approved of-by the world.

(b) As regards the Mosque of Omar it shall be considered as a Moslem concern alone and shall not be subjected directly or indirectly to any non-Moslem authority.

"(3) Since the Jewish opinion of the world is in favour of a return of Jews to Palestine and inasmuch as this opinion must remain a constant factor, and further as His Majesty’s Government view with favour the realisation of this aspiration, His Majesty’s Government are determined that in so far as is compatible with the freedom of the existing population both economic and political, no obstacle should be put in the way of the realisation of this ideal.

In this connexion the friendship of world Jewry to the Arab cause is equivalent to support in all States where Jews have a political influence. The leaders of the movement are determined to bring about the success of Zionism by friendship and co-operation with the Arabs, and such an offer is not one to be lightly thrown aside,"

== Interpretation ==
The message was not formally released in translation until 1939; after its release, it was used in testimony to the Permanent Mandates Commission by Malcolm MacDonald then Secretary of State for the Colonies in order to controversially reinterpret the meaning that had been given to the Mandate terms at prior meetings. (Note: "Regarding interpretation, in January 1918 the British Government assured King Hussein in the "Hogarth Message", that the aspirations of the Jews for a return to Palestine would be realized "in so far as is compatible with the freedom of the existing population, both economic and political." This interpretation, however, was not officially made known to the Permanent Mandates Commission until 1939 nor was it acceptable to the Commission as a whole.")

Friedman and Kedourie argue that Hussein accepted the Balfour Declaration while Charles D. Smith argues that both Friedman and Kedourie misrepresent documents and violate scholarly standards in order to reach their conclusions. Hogarth reported that Hussein "would not accept an independent Jewish State in Palestine, nor was I instructed to warn him that such a state was contemplated by Great Britain".

The secret Sykes–Picot Agreement had been revealed in the British press in late November of the previous year and in response to a query by Hussein, the British had sent the Bassett Letter of 8 February. It did not call for Arab sovereignty, but the French and British agreement did call for "suzerainty of an Arab chief" in its A and B areas and "an international administration, the form of which is to be decided upon after consultation with Russia, and subsequently in consultation with the other allies, and the representatives of the Shereef of Mecca" in its brown area (a reduced Palestine).

== See also ==
- Damascus Protocol
- Hussein-McMahon Correspondence
