= Garland grenade =

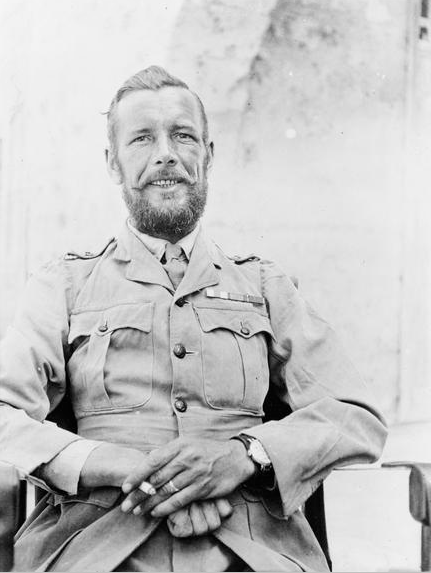
Herbert Garland in 1917

The Garland grenade was a grenade and trench mortar bomb developed and used by British Empire forces in the First World War. It was invented by the metallurgist Herbert Garland at the Cairo Citadel, and more than 174,000 were issued to the Mediterranean Expeditionary Force. The grenade was also used during the Arab Revolt. The Mark I grenade was relatively primitive, being formed of an explosive-filled food tin with a fuse that was lit with a match. The Mark II version was made of cast iron and could be fired from the Garland Trench Mortar.

== Background ==
The Garland grenade was invented by Herbert Garland, a pre-war metallurgist who was Superintendent of the Explosives Laboratory and Magazines at Cairo Citadel. Garland developed the grenades during the first year of the First World War (1914-1918); some 174,000 would be produced and issued to the Mediterranean Expeditionary Force. They were also used by T. E. Lawrence's Arab Revolt forces in their attacks on the Hejaz Railway. Garland served with Lawrence in Arabia as an explosives expert and was responsible for much of the damage caused to the Ottoman railway system.

== Mark I ==
The first version of the grenade was made from empty food tins that were filled with explosive, barbed wire and spent bullet cases. This version was activated by manually lighting a fuse with a match. This was usually a two-man operation with the thrower holding the grenade behind his back with a match pressed against the fuse. An assistant would then rub a match box striker against the match, calling "ready" when the fuse was lit. The thrower would then hurl the grenade at the target. One user of the grenade during the Gallipoli campaign described them as "unreliable and dangerous". The Mark I grenade was the only grenade available to the British Empire troops at Gallipoli until May 1915.

== Mark II ==
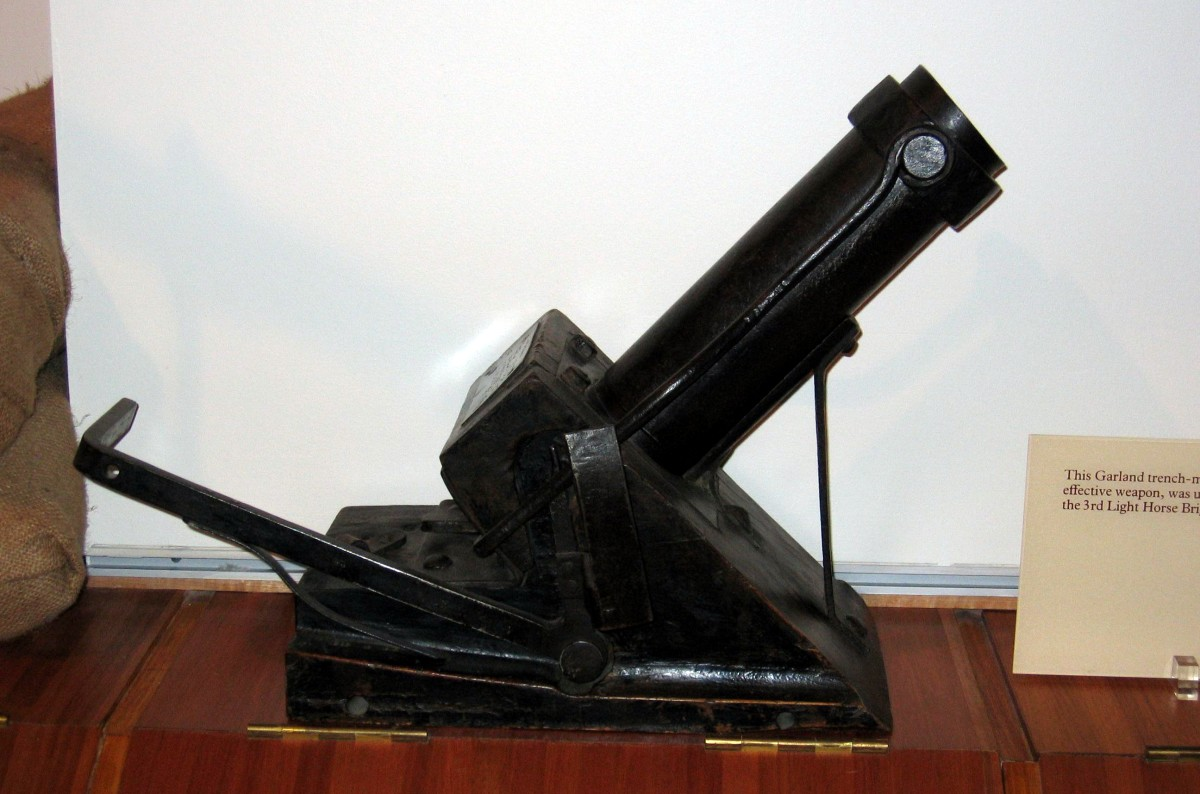
The Garland Trench Mortar could be used to fire the MkII grenade

The Mark II version of the Garland grenade was typically used in conjunction with the Garland Trench Mortar (or "howitzer"), though it could also be thrown by hand. The Mark II grenade was housed in a mushroom-shaped, cast-iron case. When shipped a plug prevented the detonator, housed in a moving zinc tube, from activating. Upon arrival at the battlefield, the plug was removed and replaced with a bronze screw-threaded pin. The pin would be unscrewed to free the detonator and screwed into the nose of the grenade where it acted as a firing pin. When the grenade struck the ground, nose first, the detonator tube would impact on the firing pin. This would trigger the fuse to detonate 3 ounces (85 g) of gelignite within the zinc tube, fragmenting the case to act as shrapnel. To improve the likelihood the grenade landed nose first, a cloth streamer was fitted at the base within a wooden block that fell away once the grenade was in the air.
