= Herbert Garland =

British Army officer (1880-1921)

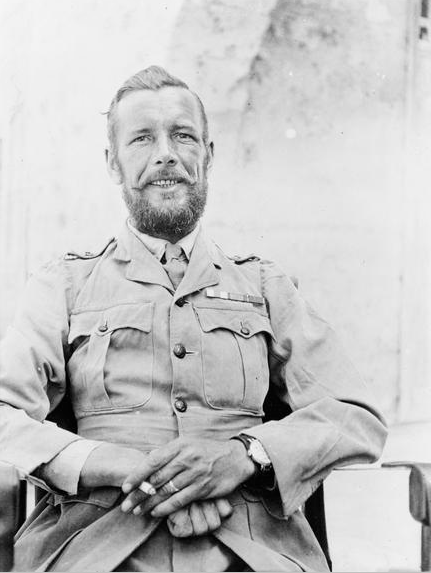
- Garland in Arabia, December 1917
- Born: 1880; Sheffield, England
- Died: 2 April 1921 (aged 40–41); England
- Burial place: Gravesend
- Military career
- Allegiance: United Kingdom / British Empire
- Branch: British Army
- Rank: Major
- Conflicts: First World War; Arab Revolt
- Awards: Military Cross; Officer of the Order of the British Empire; Order of the Nile (fourth class); Order of El Nahda (third class)

Major Herbert Garland OBE MC FCS M. Inst. Metals (1880 – 2 April 1921) was a British metallurgist and army officer. An Army Ordnance Corps member, in 1906 he was stationed on Guernsey, where he wrote a novel, Diverse Affections: a Romance of Guernsey. Garland rose to become Superintendent of Laboratories at the Cairo Citadel, Egypt by 1913 and received a grant from the Chemical Society, of which he was a fellow, to conduct research into ancient Egyptian alloys. The outbreak of war saw him commissioned as a Special List officer with the Arab Bureau. Garland developed explosives for the army, including the Garland grenade and was, in September 1916, assigned to train T. E. Lawrence and the fighters of the Arab Revolt in explosives. His mines were used against the Hejaz Railway and may have been involved in the first derailing of a moving train by explosives. Garland commanded the desperate defence of Yanbu in which he forced an attacking superior Ottoman force to withdraw with almost no bloodshed. Awarded the Military Cross and appointed an Officer of the Order of the British Empire, Garland became director of the Arab Bureau after the war and was involved in the post-war negotiations for the future of Arabia. Returning from Egypt because of poor health, Garland died within days of setting foot in England.

== Early career ==
Garland was born in Sheffield in 1880. In 1906, he published a novel, Diverse Affections: a Romance of Guernsey, written whilst stationed on the island with the Army Ordnance Corps. Garland was later transferred to Khartoum, Sudan and by the outbreak of the First World War was Superintendent of Laboratories at the Cairo Citadel, Egypt, where he had received a grant from the Chemical Society to research ancient Egyptian alloys. He was elected a fellow of the society the same year. He was one of the first to study the crystalline structures of ancient metals by polishing, etching and examination by microscope. He had three papers published in the Cairo Scientific Journal in 1913-4 entitled Ancient Egyptian Metal Tools; Outlines of Metallography and Some Physical Properties of Tin.

== First World War ==
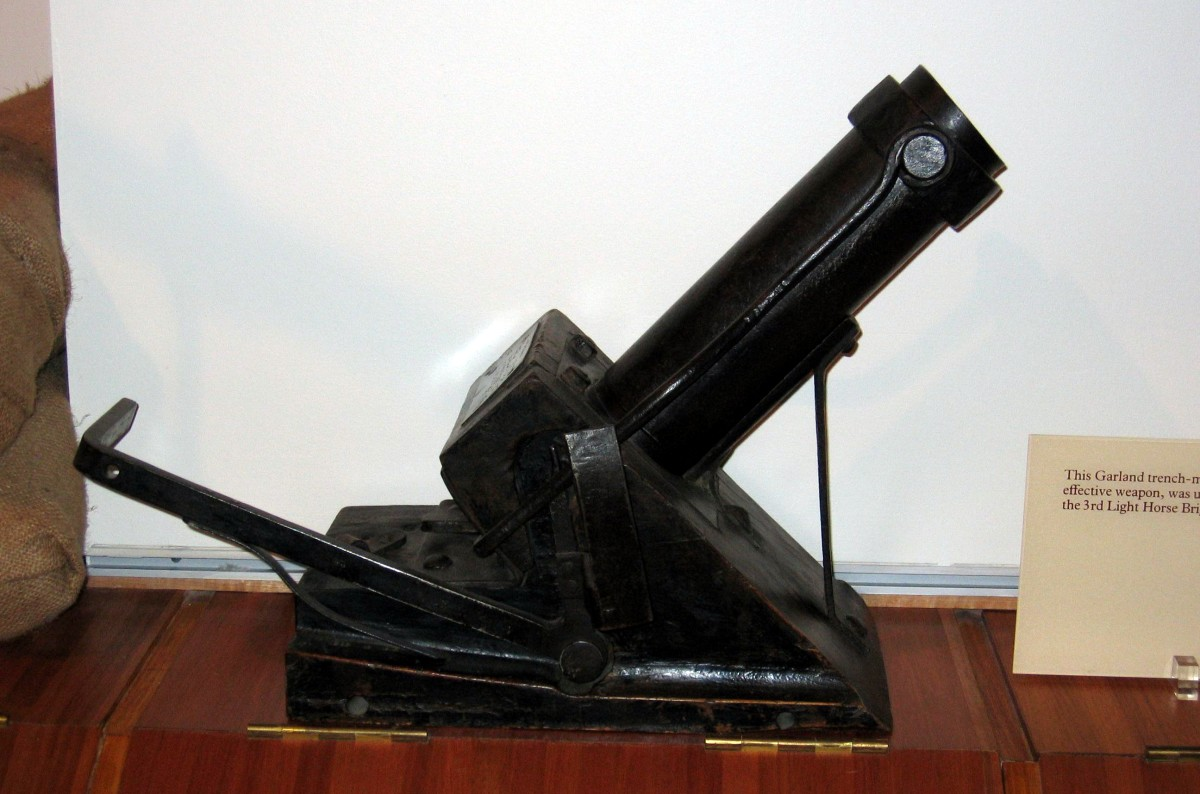
A surviving Garland Trench Mortar

Initially involved with the development of new weapons, Garland devised the Garland grenade in 1914 – 174,000 of these weapons were produced and supplied to the Mediterranean Expeditionary Force during the war and Lawrence's forces used them in their campaign to disrupt the Hejaz Railway. He also developed the Garland Trench Mortar, a 65mm calibre improvised device that was trialled by Australian forces at Gallipoli.

Garland, who spoke Arabic, was assigned to British Intelligence's Arab Bureau and was posted to Hejaz in September 1916. There he applied his practical knowledge of explosives to developing mines, teaching T. E. Lawrence and the Arab rebels to use them during their guerilla campaign and contributing to the British capture of Damascus and the eventual downfall of the Ottoman Empire. One of his initial tasks was to help fortify the town of Jiddah, recently captured by Arab forces.

He taught me how to be familiar with high explosive. Sappers handled it like a sacrament, but Garland would shove a handful of detonators into his pocket with a string of primers, fuse, and fusees and jump gaily on his camel for a week's ride to the Hejaz railway.

— TE Lawrence

On 2 and 3 December 1916 Garland commanded the Arab forces inside the town during the Battle of Yanbu. The Arabs numbered no more than 1,500 men and the Ottomans were expected to descend upon the town imminently. Garland saw to it that a defensive trench was dug by the townsfolk, barbed wire entanglements were established, machine gun positions were correctly sited and the towns' 300-year-old coral walls were strengthened. He even brought into service an old Turkish cannon that, in Garlands words, was "apt to fire astern instead of forward". With the supporting gunfire and searchlights of five Royal Navy vessels he held off advancing Ottoman forces in a relatively bloodless victory that ensured the continuance of the Arab Revolt. The searchlights were thought by one of Garland's men to have been key to winning the battle, being used to discourage an Ottoman attack by highlighting the coverless plain that had to be crossed prior to reaching the town.

The Hejaz railway which Garland sought to disrupt

One of Garland's contact mines derailed an Ottoman locomotive in 1917, in what some consider the first such attack on a moving train. During the Siege of Medina he served as military advisor to Abdullah I of Jordan. In the final days of the war in Arabia Garland was sent to Medina to oversee the surrender of that town to the allies. As a temporary captain on the Special List he was awarded the Military Cross on 3 June 1917. Garland was appointed a Member of the Order of the British Empire in the King's Birthday Honours on 3 June 1918. He received permission to accept the fourth class award of the Order of the Nile on 26 November 1919 and the third class of the Order of El Nahda on 16 January 1920. Garland was also appointed an Officer of the Order of the British Empire and mentioned in dispatches several times.

== Post-war ==
Garland transferred to the General List of officers on 6 May 1920 with the grade of a class FF staff officer (equivalent to staff captain), but without pay or allowances. He relinquished his commission on 14 May that year, but received permission to retain his rank. He was later appointed major and became director of the Arab Bureau in Cairo, under the High Commissioner to Egypt Lord Allenby. Garland's main task was to resolve the post-war state of the Arabian Peninsula which the war had left in the hands of a number of competing Arab tribes and to tackle the delicate matter of the ending of lavish subsidies from the British treasury to Hussein bin Ali, Sharif of Mecca.

In 1921 Garland left Egypt on health grounds, returning to England on 28 March. He died suddenly on 2 April of a ruptured aortic aneurysm, and was buried in Gravesend. His notes were published posthumously in 1927, as Ancient Egyptian Metallurgy, having been written up by Charles Olden Bannister, Professor of metallurgy at Liverpool University.

Garland's papers are archived at the Imperial War Museum, London, having been donated by his daughter, Mena.

== Bibliography ==
- Garland, Herbert (1906). Diverse Affections: a Romance of Guernsey. The Century Press.
- Garland, Herbert; Bannister, Charles Olden (1927). Ancient Egyptian Metallurgy. Charles Griffin & Company.
