= David George Hogarth =

British archaeologist (1862–1927)

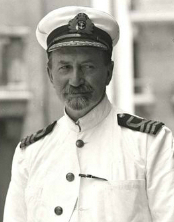
- Commander Hogarth in 1918
- Born: 23 May 1862; Barton-upon-Humber, Lincolnshire, England
- Died: 6 November 1927 (aged 65); Oxford, Oxfordshire, England
- Education: Oxford University
- Spouse: Laura Violet (Hogarth) Uppleby
- Scientific career
- Fields: Orientalist Archaeology, classics, education, journalism, fund directorship, museum curatorship, intelligence operations and directorship, diplomacy
- Workplaces: Magdalen College, Oxford; British School at Athens; Ashmolean Museum

David George Hogarth CMG FRGS FBA (23 May 1862 – 6 November 1927), also known as D. G. Hogarth, was a British orientalist archaeologist and scholar associated with T. E. Lawrence and Arthur Evans. He was Keeper of the Ashmolean Museum, Oxford from 1909 to 1927.

Hogarth was commissioned into the Royal Naval Volunteer Reserve during the First World War and served with the Naval Intelligence Division. During 1916, he was the acting director of the Arab Bureau, and was later responsible for delivering the Hogarth message.

== Early life and education ==
D. G. Hogarth was the son of Reverend George Hogarth, Vicar of Barton-upon-Humber, and Jane Elizabeth (Uppleby) Hogarth. He had a sister three years younger, Janet E. Courtney, an author and feminist. In one of his autobiographical works, Hogarth claimed to be an antiquary who was made so, rather than born to it. He said, "nothing disposed me to my trade in early years." Those years included a secondary education, 1876–1880, at Winchester College, which claims to be, and was labelled by Hogarth as, "our oldest Public School."

In October 1881, Hogarth matriculated into Magdalen College, Oxford to study Literae Humaniores. He achieved first class honours in both Mods (1882) and Greats (1885). He graduated with a Bachelor of Arts (BA) degree in 1885: as per tradition, his BA was promoted to a Master of Arts (MA Oxon) degree.

== Career ==
In 1886, Hogarth was elected a Fellow of Magdalen College, Oxford. Between 1887 and 1907, he travelled to excavations in Cyprus, Crete, Egypt, Syria, Melos, and Ephesus (the Temple of Artemis). On the island of Crete, he excavated Zakros and Psychro Cave. Hogarth was named director of the British School at Athens in 1897 and occupied the position until 1900. He was the keeper of the Ashmolean Museum in Oxford from 1909 until his death in 1927.

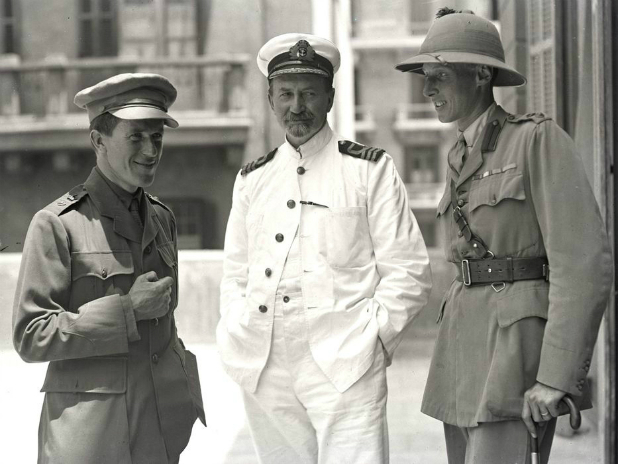
Hogarth (centre), with T. E. Lawrence (left) and Lt Col. Dawnay at the Arab Bureau, Cairo, May 1918

In 1915, during the First World War, Hogarth was commissioned with the temporary rank of lieutenant commander in the Royal Naval Volunteer Reserve and joined the Geographical Section of the Naval Intelligence Division. Professor Hogarth was appointed the acting director of the Arab Bureau, for a time during 1916 when Sir Mark Sykes went back to London. Kinahan Cornwallis was his deputy. Hogarth was close with T. E. Lawrence and worked with Lawrence to plan the Arab Revolt.

Sykes befriended Hogarth, who had described the Indian Government as believing they had a moral imperative to the British Raj as the best form of government and could not fail in their duty to impose it on a Province of Mesopotamia. The Arabists rejected this proposal vehemently; Sykes took Hogarth's research as evidence of the uniquely different situation in the Protectorate. The archaeologists knew it was clear that the Raj had no understanding of the different conditions, and that there needed to be a specific "Arab Policy" for what had become a frontier of empire.

Hogarth returned to Oxford and the Ashmolean Museum in June 1919. From 1925 to 1927, he was President of the Royal Geographical Society.

== Personal life ==
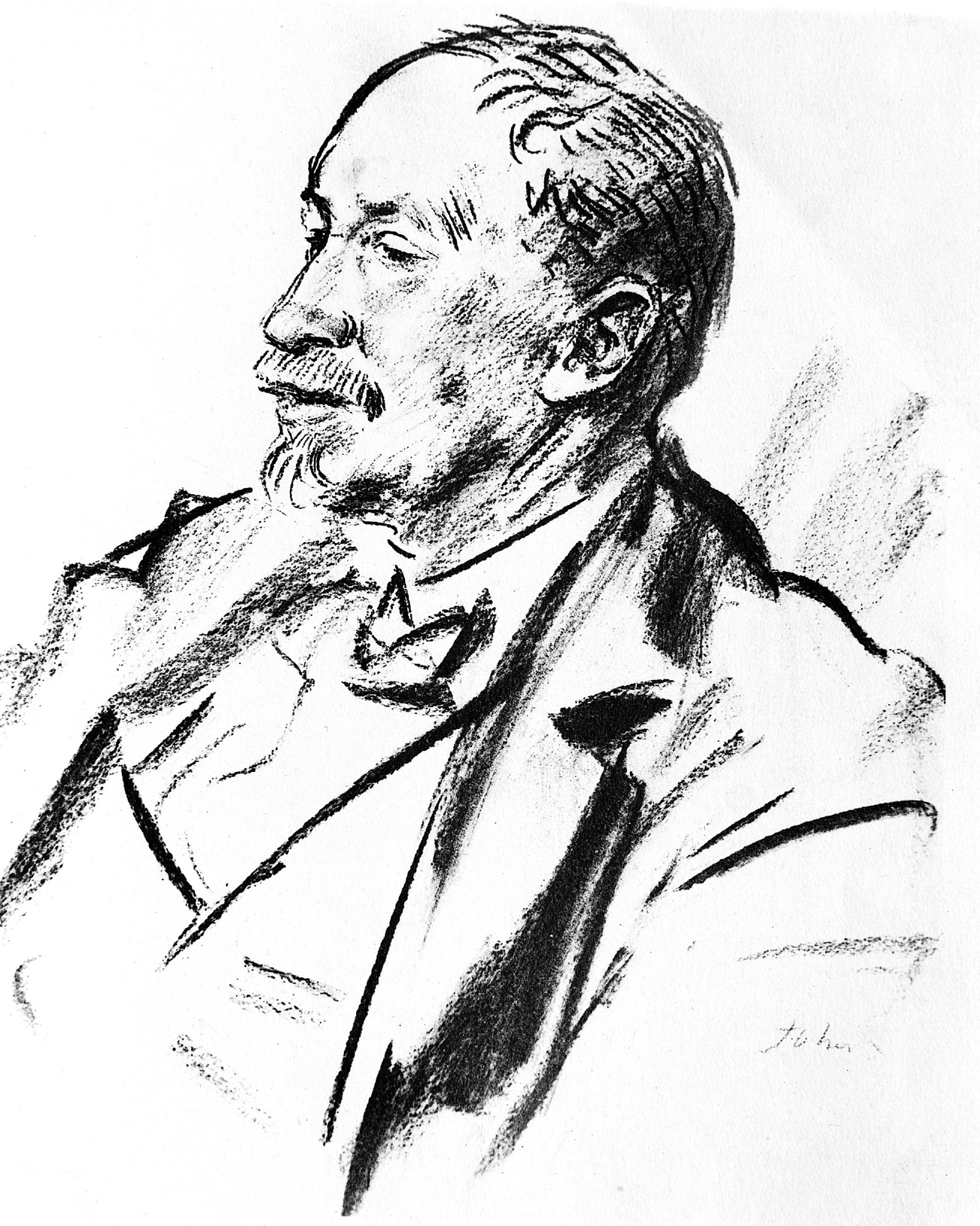
D. G. Hogarth M.A. by Augustus John

On 7 November 1894, Hogarth married Laura Violet Uppleby, daughter of George Charles Uppleby. His wife and mother shared a common great-great-grandfather, one John Uppleby of Wootton, Lincolnshire. Laura Violet was 26 at the time; David George, 32. They had one son, William David Hogarth (1901–1965). A granddaughter, Caroline Barron, is a historian of later medieval England.

In 1926, Hogarth's health began rapidly deteriorating due to a heart condition, and he was granted leave from Oxford in October 1927. He died on 6 November 1927 at his home in Oxford (20 St Giles' Street). He was aged 65.

== Honours ==
Handwriting (1906)

In 1896, Hogarth was elected a Fellow of the Royal Geographical Society (FRGS). In 1905, he was elected a Fellow of the British Academy (FBA), the United Kingdom's national academy for the humanities and social sciences. In 1917, he was made a Commander of the Order of the Nile by the Sultan of Egypt, and awarded the Founder's Medal of the Royal Geographical Society. In the 1918 New Year Honours, he was appointed a Companion of the Order of St Michael and St George (CMG) for his efforts during the First World War. In 1919, he was awarded the Order of Nahda (Hejaz) 2nd class by Hussein bin Ali, Sharif of Mecca.

== See also ==
- Gertrude Bell
- Mr. Dryden

== Bibliography ==
=== By Hogarth ===
- Hogarth, D. G.; James, M. R.; Smith, R. Elsey; Gardner, E. A. (1888). 'Excavations in Cyprus, 1887-88. Paphos, Leontari, Amargetti'. The Journal of Hellenic Studies. 9: 147–271. doi:10.2307/623675. ISSN 0075-4269.
- Hogarth, David George (1889). Devia Cypria: notes of an archaeological journey in Cyprus in 1888. London: H. Frowde.
- —— (1896). A wandering scholar in the Levant. London: J. Murray.
- —— (1897). Philip and Alexander of Macedon: two essays in biography. New York: C. Scribner's Sons.
- Grenfell, Bernard Pyne, Hunt, Arthur Surridge, and Hogarth, David George (1900). Fayûm Towns and Their Papyri, London: Kegan Paul, Trench, Trübner/Quaritch/Frowde.
- —— (1902). The Nearer East. London: W. Heinemann.
- —— (1904). The penetration of Arabia : a record of the development of Western knowledge concerning the Arabian peninsula. London: Lawrence and Bullen.
- The Archaic Artemisia of Ephesus (1908)
- —— (1909). Ionia and the East; six lectures delivered before the University of London. Oxford: Clarendon Press.
- —— (1910). Accidents of an antiquary's life. London: MacMillan and Co., Limited.
- The Ancient East (1914)
- Hogarth, D. G. and Benson, E. F. (n.d.) Report on prospects of Research in Alexandria. London: Society for the Promotion of Hellenic Studies,
- Forbes, Nevill; Toynbee, Arnold J.; Mitrany, D.; Hogarth, D. G. (1915). "Turkey". The Balkans: A History of Bulgaria, Serbia, Greece, Rumania, Turkey. Oxford: At the Clarendon Press – via Internet Archive.
- —— (1920). Hittite seals, with particular reference to the Ashmolean collection. Oxford: Clarendon Press.
- Arabia (1922) (also as A History of Arabia)
- Kings of the Hittites (1926) (Schweich Lectures for 1924)
- The Life of Charles M. Doughty (1928)

=== With Hogarth as editor ===
- Authority and Archaeology – Sacred and Profane – Essays on the relation of monuments to Biblical and Classical Literature (1899 2nd Edition)

== Bibliography ==
- İpek, Mübarek, Oryantalist David George Hogarth'ın Hayatı ve İngiliz İstihbarat Servisi İle İlişkisi (1862-1927), Mukaddime, 2023
- Graves, Robert (1927). Lawrence and the Arabs. London: Jonathan Cape.
- M. J. L. (1927). "Dr. D. G. Hogarth, C.M.G." Nature. 120 (3029): 735–737. Bibcode:1927Natur.120..735J. doi:10.1038/120735a0.
- Onley, James (2007). The Arabian Frontier of the British Raj. New York: Oxford University Press.
- Townshend, Charles (2010). When God Made Hell: The British Invasion of Mesopotamia and the Creation of Iraq 1914-1921. Faber and Faber.
- Wilson, Jeremy (1989). Lawrence of Arabia. Atheneum. ISBN 9780689119347.

Academic offices
Preceded by Cecil Harcourt Smith	Director of the British School at Athens; 1897 to 1900	Succeeded by R. C. Bosanquet
Preceded by Sir Arthur Evans	Keeper of the Ashmolean Museum; 1909 to 1927	Succeeded by Edward Thurlow Leeds
