= Bassett letter =

The Bassett letter was a letter dated 8 February 1918 from the British government to Hussein bin Ali, Sharif of Mecca, following Hussein's request for an explanation of the Sykes–Picot Agreement. It was delivered by Lieutenant Colonel J. R. Bassett, Acting British Agent at Jeddah, who was forwarding a message he had received by telegram from the Foreign Office in London.

The letter dismissed the publication of the Sykes–Picot Agreement as an attempt by the Ottoman Empire to create mistrust between the Arabs and Britain during the Arab Revolt.

It was a formal message to support a telegram sent a few days previously to Hussein by Reginald Wingate, High Commissioner in Egypt. The preface to the Bassett letter noted that Wingate had directed the sending of the letter.

== The letter ==
The letter was written in Arabic. An English translation was published in 1938 in The Arab Awakening, whereby its author, George Antonius, noted that the text of the original communication had "often appeared in the Arabic Press in facsimile reproduction from a photostat copy supplied by the late King Hussein":

The loyal motives which have prompted Your Majesty to forward to the High Commissioner the letters addressed by the Turkish commander-in-chief in Syria to His Highness the Amir Faisal and to Ja'far Pasha have caused His Majesty's Government the liveliest satisfaction. The steps taken by Your Majesty in this connexion are only a token of the friendship and mutual sincerity which have always inspired the relations between the Government of the Hejaz and His Majesty's Government. It would be superfluous to point out that the object aimed at by Turkey is to sow doubt and suspicion between the Allied Powers and those Arabs who, under Your Majesty's leadership and guidance, are striving nobly to recover their ancient freedom. The Turkish policy is to create dissension by luring the Arabs into believing that the Allied Powers have designs on the Arab countries, and by represent to the Allies that the Arabs might be made to renounce their aspirations. But such intrigues cannot succeed in sowing dissension among those whose minds are directed by a common purpose to a common end.
His Majesty's Government and their allies stand steadfastly by every cause aiming at the liberation of the oppressed nations, and they are determined to stand by the Arab peoples in their struggle for the establishment of an Arab world in which law shall replace Ottoman injustice, and in which unity shall prevail over the rivalries artificially provoked by the policy of Turkish officials. His Majesty's Government re-affirm their former pledge in regard to the liberation of the Arab peoples. His Majesty's Government have hitherto made it their policy to ensure that liberation, and it remains the policy they are determined unflinchingly to pursue by protecting such Arabs as are already liberated from all dangers and perils, and by assisting those who are still under the yoke of the tyrants to obtain their freedom.

== Bibliography ==
- Antonius, George (1938). The Arab Awakening: The Story of the Arab National Movement. Hamish Hamilton. ISBN 9780710306739.
- Margaret Pope (1946). "The Bassett Letter". ABC of the Arab world. The Socialist Book Centre Ltd.
- Steve Posner (1987). Israel Undercover. Syracuse University Press. pp. 140–. ISBN 978-0-8156-5203-8.
- Rom Landau (2013). Islam and the Arabs. Routledge. pp. 243–. ISBN 978-1-134-53671-9.

== See also ==
- Sykes–Picot Agreement
- Hogarth Message
