= Arab Bureau =

Department of British Intelligence in Cairo during the First World War

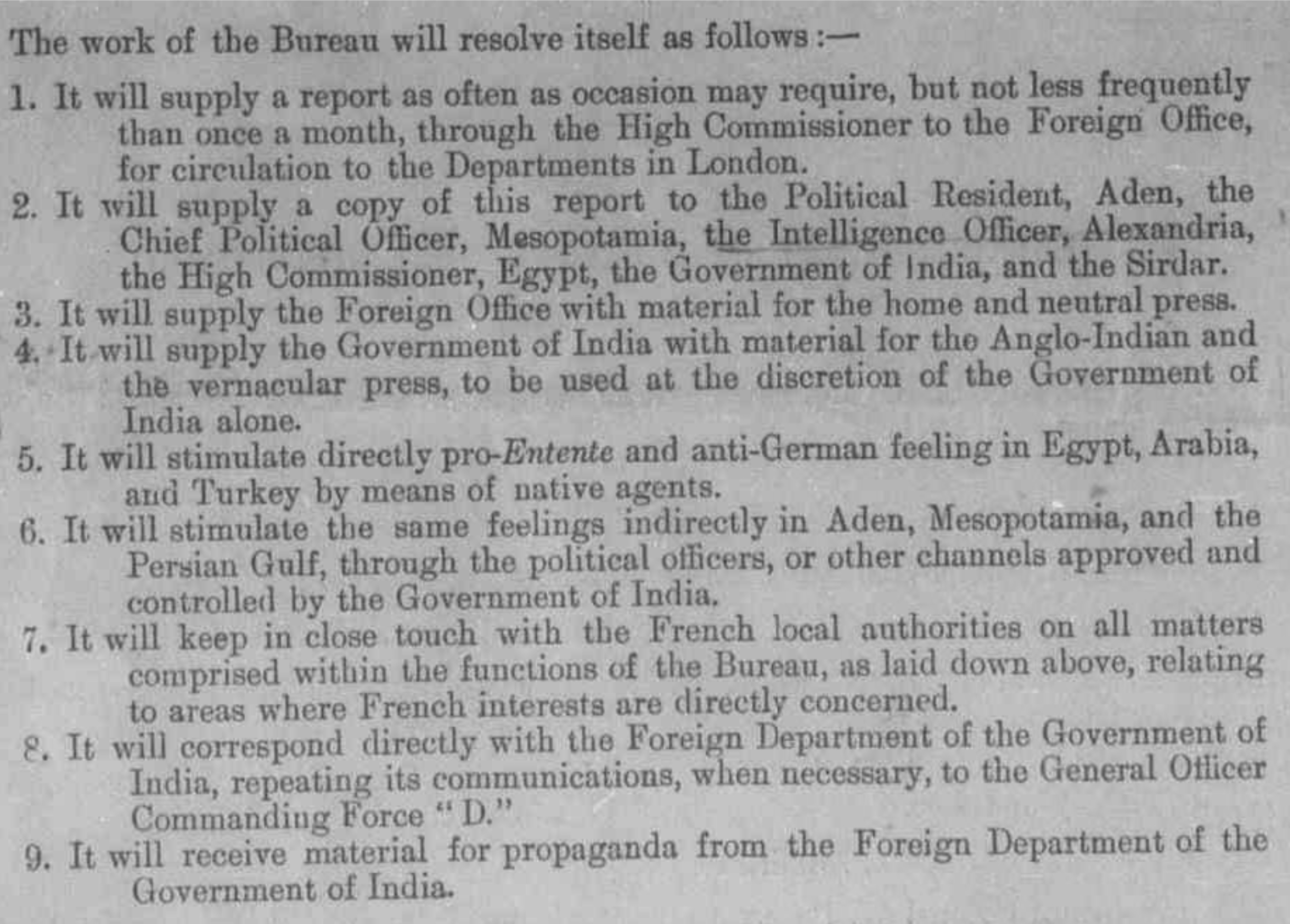
Arab Bureau terms of reference at the Interdepartmental meeting for establishment of the Bureau, 7 January 1916

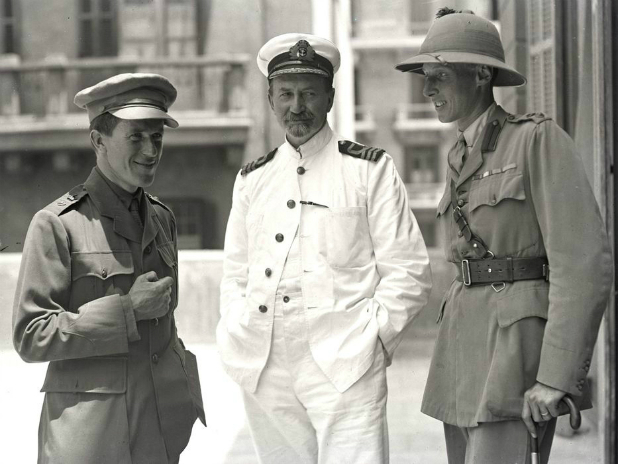
Lieutenant-Colonel Thomas Edward Lawrence (Lawrence of Arabia) (1888 - 1935, left); David George Hogarth (1862 - 1927) and Lieutenant-Colonel Dawnay (1878-1952), at the Arab Bureau of Britain's Foreign Office, Cairo, May 1918.

The Arab Bureau was a section of the Cairo Intelligence Department established in 1916 during the First World War, and closed in 1920, whose purpose was the collection and dissemination of propaganda and intelligence about the Arab regions of the Middle East.

According to a Committee of Imperial Defence paper from 7 January 1916, the Arab Bureau was established to "harmonise British political activity in the Near East...[and] keep the Foreign Office, the India Office, the Committee of Defence, the War Office, the Admiralty, and Government of India simultaneously informed of the general tendency of Germano-Turkish Policy."

Bruce Westrate wrote in his 1992 history of the Arab Bureau that "the agency has subsequently borne much of the blame for Britain's terrible mishandling of Middle Eastern policy during and shortly after World War I."

== History ==
=== Beginnings ===
It was constituted on the initiative of Mark Sykes who, in December 1915, reported to London that, in a recent tour of the Middle East from Egypt to India, he had discovered that the German and Turkish Governments were widely distributing anti-British wartime propaganda that countered British efforts and action in the Middle East. Sykes was concerned because British command posts in the Middle East were generally uncooperative and thus far unable to produce effective counterpropaganda. Sykes proposed the creation of a London office under his auspices to gather, filter, and distribute intelligence on the German and Turkish Middle East policy and "co-ordinate propaganda in favour of the United Kingdom among non-Indian Moslems."

=== Support ===
Sykes' proposal was welcomed by Gilbert Clayton, the director of civilian and military intelligence in Egypt and Sudan. Clayton believed that such an office might not only discover and counter enemy propaganda but be capable of overseeing a wider collection of political and military information regarding the Middle East and in turn produce easily understood reports to inform policymaking in Cairo and London toward the Ottoman Arab territories.

=== Opposition ===
Clayton's preference for locating the Arab Bureau in Cairo met with resistance from the Indian Government (under the Viceroy Charles Hardinge) and the India Office (under the Secretary of State for India, Austen Chamberlain), who did not want interference in their control of territories around the Persian Gulf and particularly the Iraq provinces that they planned to occupy and cultivate for grain production for India. Newly discovered oil deposits located around the North Gulf brought further attention to the region. But the director of Naval Intelligence in Britain, Captain Reginald 'Blinker' Hall, supported Clayton's concept and urged government approval.

=== Establishment ===
The result was a compromise. In January 1916, the Arab Bureau was established as a section of Sudan Intelligence in Cairo, ultimately answering to the High Commissioner in Egypt (Henry McMahon) who in turn was overseen by the Foreign Office and the Secretary of State for Foreign Affairs (Edward Grey) in London. It was staffed by Middle East experts from military intelligence, Egypt Force who shared Clayton's outlook.

=== Closure ===
Arnold Wilson later wrote that:

The Arab Bureau in Cairo died unregretted in 1920, having helped to induce His Majesty's Government to adopt a policy which brought disaster to the people of Syria, disillusionment to the Arabs of Palestine and ruin to the Hijaz.

== Staff ==
Gilbert Clayton was named head or "chief" of the Arab Bureau. David Hogarth, a naval intelligence officer, was acting director of the Arab Bureau and Kinahan Cornwallis his deputy. Herbert Garland, George Ambrose Lloyd, George Stewart Symes, Philip Graves, Gertrude Bell, Aubrey Herbert, William Ormsby-Gore, Thomas Edward Lawrence, Alfred Guillaume and Tracy Philipps were also part of the Arab Bureau.

In 1920, Garland was appointed director, under High Commissioner to Egypt Lord Allenby.

== Bibliography ==
- A Peace to End All Peace, David Fromkin, Avon Books, New York, 1990.
- Arabian Personalities of the Early Twentieth Century with a new Introduction by Robin Bidwell (reprints from Bureau's Handbooks) The Oleander Press 1986, ISBN 0-906672-39-2.
- Military Intelligence and the Arab Revolt: The First Modern Intelligence War, Polly Mohs, Routledge, New York, 2008.
- The Arab Bureau, Bruce Westrate, Penn State Press, 1992.
