= Garland trench mortar =

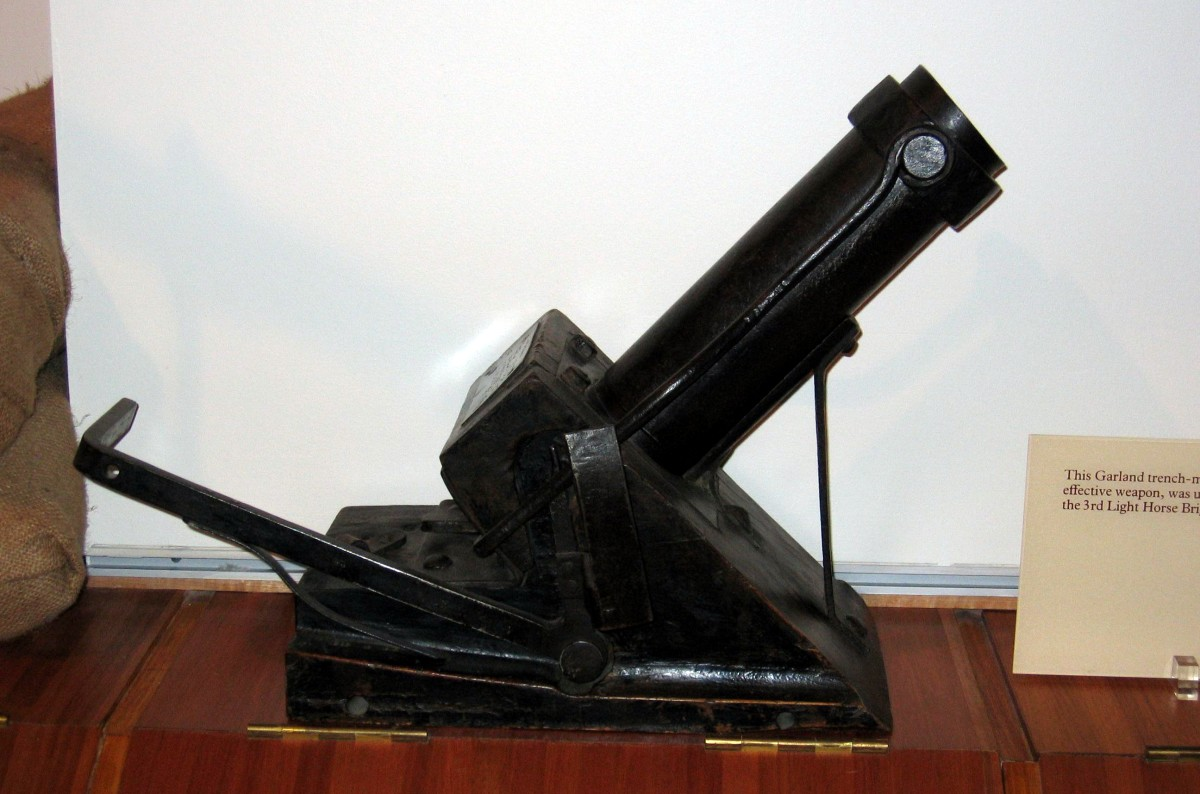
- A Garland trench mortar recovered from Gallipoli in 1919 and now in the collection of the Australian War Memorial, Canberra
- Type: Trench mortar
- Place of origin: United Kingdom

Service history
- Used by: United Kingdom; Australia
- Wars: World War I

Production history
- Designer: Herbert Garland
- Manufacturer: Cairo Citadel

Specifications
- Shell: Jam tin grenade
- Calibre: 65mm
- Elevation: Fixed at 45°
- Traverse: None

The Garland trench mortar was an improvised mortar used by Australian and British forces at Gallipoli during the Dardanelles Campaign of 1915–16. Developed early in the war by Herbert Garland, a pre-war metallurgist and superintendent of laboratories at the Cairo Citadel, it was the most numerous mortar of the Gallipoli Campaign. A simple, improvised design, the Garland mortar consisted of a smoothbore steel barrel fixed at 45 degrees to a solid wooden base. By means of a powder charge it propelled a variant of the jam tin grenade. Its design meant that the whole weapon had to be turned to change its traverse and raised on a box to increase its range but despite these limitations it was reported to have done "good work" in the front line.

== Design ==
The mortar was developed by Herbert Garland, superintendent of laboratories at the Cairo Citadel in Egypt. The weapon was of straightforward construction, comprising a plain, smoothbore, tempered steel barrel of 65 mm calibre fitted at a fixed 45-degree angle to a solid wooden base. There are references to the bombs themselves being variants of the improvised Jam Tin Grenade with a steel shaft affixed. However the Australian War Museum holds an example of a more complex bomb with a three ounce gelignite charge and an impact detonation mechanism, mounted on a wooden shaft. This latter type of grenade could also be modified to be thrown by hand.

The shaft protruded down the barrel of the mortar to the charge (of 5 drams of smokeless powder), leaving the bomb itself outside the barrel. A white calico tail was affixed to the bomb to improve the accuracy of its flight. With the barrel affixed to the base the only means of traversing was to turn the entire unit. Since the barrel was fixed at a 45-degree angle, the mortar was already set up to fire the grenade the maximum theoretical distance for a ballistic projectile. To change the range the entire mortar had to be raised vertically, typically by propping it up on a box. Raising only the front of the mortar so the barrel was at an angle greater than 45 degrees would reduce the distance travelled by launching the grenade into a higher trajectory more typical of a mortar. Raising the back would also reduce the distance travelled by launching the grenade into a flatter trajectory more typical of a cannon. A spotter was able to track the progress of the bomb during daylight by watching for the shaft revolving in the air and at night the sparks from the bomb's fuse marked its progress.

== In service ==
General William Birdwood, commander of the Australian and New Zealand Army Corps, in correspondence with Garland, agreed to trial the mortar during the Dardanelles Campaign. The weapon was manufactured at the Citadel in Cairo and proved to be in great demand by units posted to Gallipoli. Several Australian units had them in service as well as the Highland Light Infantry, Worcestershire Regiment and Suffolk Regiment. Ammunition was in plentiful supply and the Garland soon became the most common mortar in use at Gallipoli, the Australian 1st Division having seven in service by October 1915.

At least one batch of bombs consistently failed to detonate, according to a report from the front line. The problem was blamed on the gelatine used in the charge. The same source also stated that the quantity of propellant specified was insufficient and had been increased by two drams to throw the charge the required distance. Nevertheless, the mortar was reported to have done "good work" in the trenches.

There is an example of the weapon in the Australian War Memorial, Canberra, that was recovered from Lone Pine, Gallipoli, in January 1919.

== Gallery ==
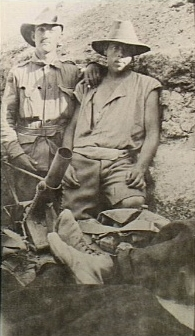
A Garland mortar in a trench with men of the 6th battalion

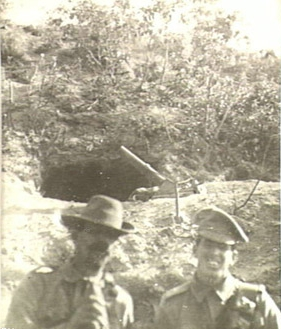
A Garland mortar in firing position at Quinn's Post

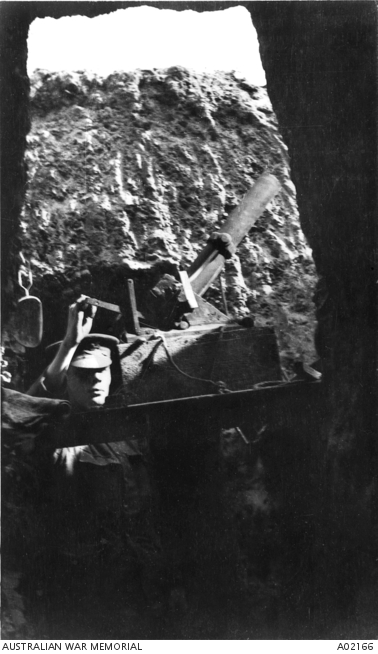
A Garland mortar operated by the 10th battalion at Gallipoli
