= Anglo-French Declaration =

Document published in 1918

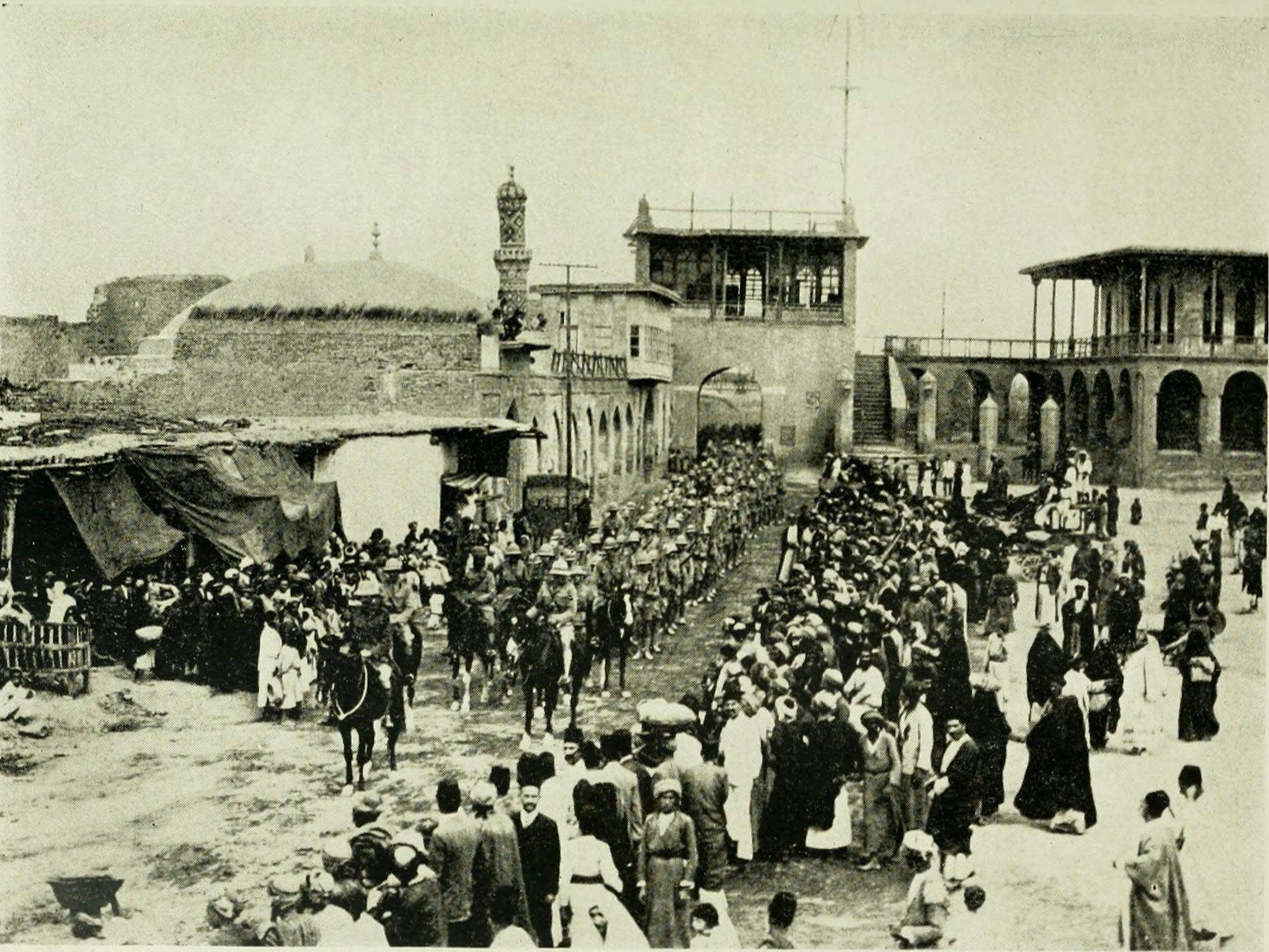
British troops entering Baghdad.

The Anglo-French Declaration was published by Great Britain and France, shortly after the Armistice of Mudros saw the capitulation of the Ottoman Empire. Some sources mention as publication date 7 November 1918, others 9 November 1918.

The declaration attempted to explain the reason why the two powers had decided to take part in the battle for Ottoman territories. France and Great Britain contended that their intentions were "the complete and final liberation of the people" who had been oppressed by the Ottoman Empire, and the establishment of democratic governments in Ottoman Syria, Ottoman Palestine, Ottoman Iraq (Mesopotamia), and other territories still to be assisted in obtaining their "liberation".

The declaration made it explicit that the form of the new governments was to be determined by local populations rather than imposed by the signatory powers. The declaration was meant to allay Arab suspicions of possible European colonialist or imperialist ambitions.

== The text ==
ANGLO-FRENCH DECLARATION
November 7, 1918

=== Translation given by the British government in Command Paper No. 5974 of 16 March 1939 ===
The object aimed at by France and Great Britain in prosecuting in the East the War let loose by the ambition of Germany is the complete and definite emancipation of the peoples so long oppressed by the Turks and the establishment of national governments and administrations deriving their authority from the initiative and free choice of the indigenous populations.

In order to carry out these intentions France and Great Britain are at one in encouraging and assisting the establishment of indigenous Governments and administrations in Syria and, Mesopotamia, now liberated by the Allies, and in the territories the liberation of which they are engaged in securing and recognising these as soon as they are actually established.

Far from wishing to impose on the populations of these regions any particular institutions they are only concerned to ensure by their support and by adequate assistance the regular working of Governments and administrations freely chosen by the populations themselves. To secure impartial and equal justice for all, to facilitate the economic development of the country by inspiring and encouraging local initiative, to favour the diffusion of education, to put an end to dissensions that have too long been taken advantage of by Turkish policy, such is the policy which the two Allied Governments uphold in the liberated territories.

=== Translation given by Sir Abdur Rahman before the United Nations Special Committee on Palestine (UNSCOP) in 1947 ===
The goal envisaged by France and Great Britain in prosecuting in the East the war set in train by German ambition is the complete and final liberation of the peoples who have for so long been oppressed by the Turks, and the setting up of national governments and ad-ministrations that shall derive their authority from the free exercise of the initiative and choice of the indigenous populations.

In pursuit of those intentions, France and Great Britain agree to further and assist in the setting up of indigenous governments and administrations in Syria and Mesopotamia, which have already been liberated by the Allies, as well as in those territories which they have been endeavouring to liberate, and to recognize them as soon as they are actually set up.

Far from wishing to impose this or that system upon the populations of those regions, their [i.e., France's and Great Britain's] only concern is to offer such support and efficacious help as will ensure the smooth working of the governments and administrations which those populations will have elected of their own free will to have; to secure impartial and equal justice for all; to facilitate the economic development of the country by promoting and encouraging local initiative; to foster the spread of education; and to put an end to the dissensions which Turkish policy has for so long exploited. Such is the task which the two Allied Powers wish to undertake in the liberated territories.

== Aftermath ==
Whatever the real intentions of France and Great Britain may have been, most territories indeed became free, some after a period of administration under League of Nations mandate, like Lebanon, Syria and Jordan.

Not all liberated peoples got the "Governments and administrations freely chosen by the populations themselves". The Kurds were divided among the new states Syria, Iraq and Turkey, and partly remained under Persian rule. The Palestinians were ultimately scattered over the State of Israel, governed by Jewish immigrants, the Occupied Palestinian territories and Jordan. Most of the Palestinians, however, ended up as refugees scattered over several countries in the region.

== See also ==
- Arab Revolt
- Arab Federation
- Hussein-McMahon Correspondence
- Sykes-Picot Agreement
- Balfour Declaration
- St. John Philby
- Entente Cordiale
- Self-determination
- French Mandate of Lebanon
