= McMahon–Hussein correspondence =

1915–16 letters on UK recognition of Arab independence

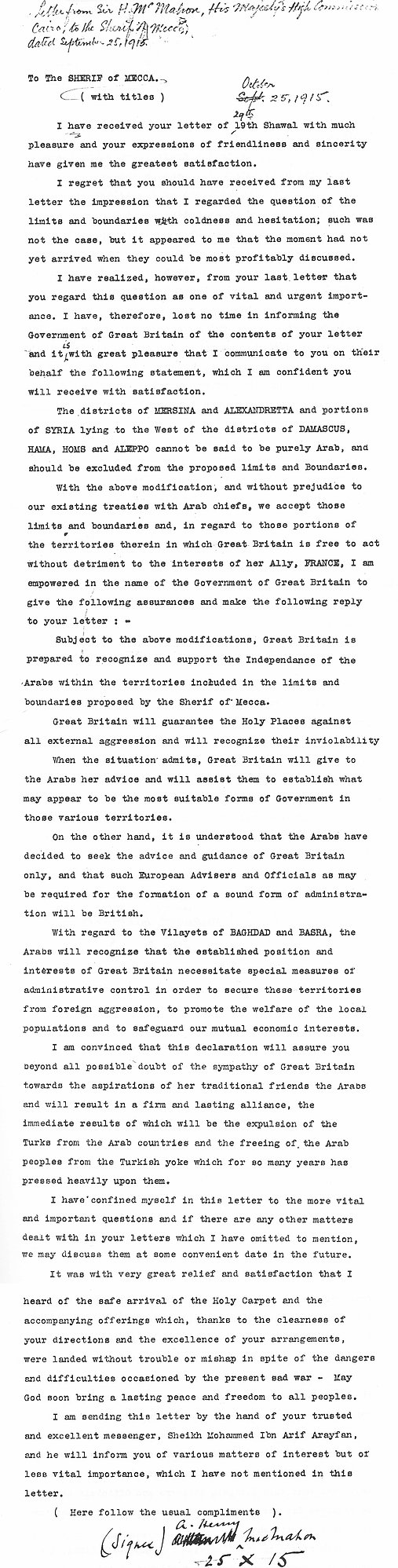
The McMahon–Hussein letter of 24 October 1915. George Antonius—who had been the first to publish the correspondence in full—described this letter as "by far the most important in the whole correspondence, and may perhaps be regarded as the most important international document in the history of the Arab national movement... is still invoked as the main piece of evidence on which the Arabs accuse Great Britain of having broken faith with them."

The McMahon–Hussein correspondence (Note: Also known as the Hussein–McMahon correspondence. (Arabic: مراسلات الحسين – مكماهون, romanized: murāsalāt al-Ḥusayn – Makmāhūn)) is a series of letters that were exchanged during World War I, in which the government of the United Kingdom agreed to recognize Arab independence in a large region after the war in exchange for the Sharif of Mecca launching the Arab Revolt against the Ottoman Empire. The correspondence had a significant influence on Middle Eastern history during and after the war; a dispute over Palestine continued thereafter. (Note: Kedouri wrote: "The genesis, and the subsequent official interpretations, of the McMahon-Husayn correspondence are essential to the understanding of a great deal of Middle-Eastern diplomatic history during and after the first world war, as well as of the Palestine dispute in the 1920s and 30s.")

The correspondence is composed of ten letters that were exchanged from July 1915 to March 1916 between Hussein bin Ali, Sharif of Mecca and Lieutenant Colonel Sir Henry McMahon, British High Commissioner to Egypt. Whilst there was some military value in the Arab manpower and local knowledge alongside the British Army, the primary reason for the arrangement was to counteract the Ottoman declaration of jihad ("holy war") against the Allies, and to maintain the support of the 70 million Muslims in British India (particularly those in the Indian Army that had been deployed in all major theatres of the wider war). The area of Arab independence was defined to be "in the limits and boundaries proposed by the Sherif of Mecca" with the exception of "portions of Syria" lying to the west of "the districts of Damascus, Homs, Hama and Aleppo"; conflicting interpretations of this description were to cause great controversy in subsequent years. One particular dispute, which continues to the present, is the extent of the coastal exclusion. (Note: William Mathew said; "The issue remains a contentious one in the historical literature (notably in the contrasting analyses of Elie Kedourie, on the exculpatory side, and George Antonius and A. L. Tibawi, on the accusatory), although the evidence for British bad faith seems clear enough.")

Following the publication of the November 1917 Balfour Declaration (a letter written by British Foreign Secretary Arthur James Balfour to Baron Rothschild, a wealthy and prominent leader in the British Jewish community), which promised a national home for the Jews in Palestine, and the subsequent leaking of the secret 1916 Sykes–Picot Agreement in which Britain and France proposed to split and occupy parts of the territory, the Sharif and other Arab leaders considered the agreements made in the McMahon–Hussein Correspondence to have been violated. Hussein refused to ratify the 1919 Treaty of Versailles and, in response to a 1921 British proposal to sign a treaty accepting the Mandate system, stated that he could not be expected to "affix his name to a document assigning Palestine to the Zionists and Syria to foreigners". A further British attempt to reach a treaty failed in 1923–24, with negotiations suspended in March 1924; within six months, the British withdrew their support in favour of their central Arabian ally Ibn Saud, who proceeded to conquer Hussein's kingdom.

The correspondence "haunted Anglo-Arab relations" for many decades thereafter. In January 1923, unofficial excerpts were published by Joseph N. M. Jeffries in the Daily Mail and copies of the letters circulated in the Arab press. (Note: Antonius described this as follows: "In actual fact, the terms of the McMahon Correspondence are known all over the Arab world. Extracts have from time to time been officially published in Mecca by the Sharif Husain himself, and several of the notes have appeared verbatim and in full in Arabic books and newspapers. It is open to any person with a knowledge of Arabic, who can obtain access to the files of defunct Arabic newspapers, to piece the whole of the McMahon notes together; and that work I have done in four years of travel and research, from Cairo to Baghdad and from Aleppo to Jedda.") Excerpts were published in the 1937 Peel Commission Report and the correspondence was published in full in George Antonius's 1938 book The Arab Awakening, then officially in 1939 as Cmd. 5957. Further documents were declassified in 1964.

== Background ==
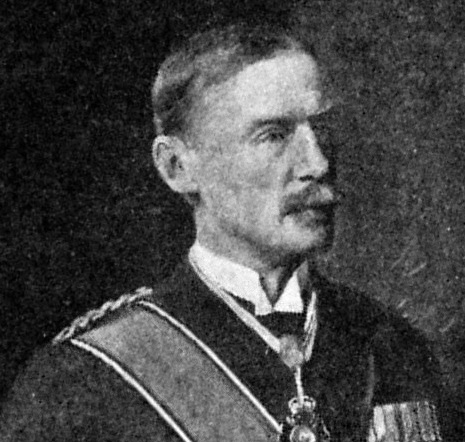
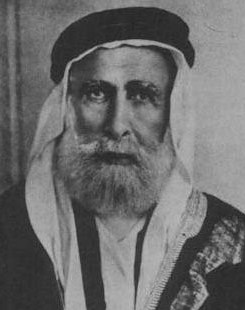
Sir Henry McMahon and Sharif Hussein

=== Initial discussions ===
The first documented discussions between the UK and the Hashemites took place in February 1914, five months before the outbreak of World War I. Discussions were between the Consul-General in Egypt Lord Kitchener and Abdullah bin al-Hussein, the second son of Hussein bin Ali, Sharif of Mecca. Hussein had grown uncomfortable with the newly appointed Ottoman governor in his Hejaz Vilayet, Wehib Pasha, reflecting on rising tensions since the 1908 completion of the Hejaz railway, which threatened to support increased Ottoman centralization in the region. Discussions culminated in a telegram sent on 1 November 1914 from Kitchener—who had recently been appointed as Secretary of War—to Hussein wherein Great Britain would, in exchange for support from the Arabs of Hejaz, "...guarantee the independence, rights and privileges of the Sharifate against all external foreign aggression, in particular, that of the Ottomans". The Sharif indicated he could not break with the Ottomans immediately but the entry of the Ottomans on Germany's side in World War I on 11 November 1914 brought about an abrupt shift in British political interests concerning an Arab revolt against the Ottomans. According to historian David Charlwood, the failure in Gallipoli led to an increased desire on the part of the UK to negotiate a deal with the Arabs. Lieshout gives further background on the reasoning behind the shift in British thinking.

=== Damascus Protocol ===
On 23 May 1915, Emir Faisal bin Hussein—the third son of Hussein—was presented with the document that became known as the Damascus Protocol. Faisal was in Damascus to resume talks with the Arab secret societies al-Fatat and Al-'Ahd that he had met in March/April; in the interim he had visited Istanbul to confront the Grand Vizier with evidence of an Ottoman plot to depose his father. The document declared the Arabs would revolt in alliance with the United Kingdom and in return the UK would recognize Arab independence in an area running from the 37th parallel near the Taurus Mountains on the southern border of Turkey, to be bounded in the east by Persia and the Persian Gulf, in the west by the Mediterranean Sea and in the south by the Arabian Sea.

== Letters, July 1915 to March 1916 ==
Following deliberations at Ta'if between Hussein and his sons in June 1915, during which Faisal counselled caution, Ali argued against rebellion and Abdullah advocated action and encouraged his father to enter into correspondence with Sir Henry McMahon, over the period 14 July 1915 to 10 March 1916 ten letters—five from each side—were exchanged between Sir Henry McMahon and Sharif Hussein. McMahon was in contact with British Foreign Secretary Edward Grey throughout; Grey was to authorise and be ultimately responsible for the correspondence. (Note: Marian Kent described this as follows: "Under the weight of such authorities and arguments Grey did not object to allowing a more precise British commitment, and authorised McMahon 'to give cordial assurances' along the lines he proposed, 'unless something more precise is required, and in that case you may give it …’…On the question of whether or not McMahon exceeded his authority it has to be concluded that although his letter of 24 October committed Britain so much more in detail, this alarmed the Foreign Office only because it was now being obliged to honor its undertakings and not because these were in any way being misinterpreted. At no other stage did McMahon do other than communicate to the Sherif anything more than that for which he had expressly requested—and received—Foreign Office authority … In the last resort the Foreign Office and its chief, Grey, and to a lesser extent, its permanent, non-political chief, Nicolson, have to bear the responsibility for the policy carried out in their name. And the conclusion that has to be drawn is that on this issue the leadership was poor. Grey let himself be swayed, against his better judgment, and to be carried along by events which he made little effort to dominate or modify. He was, as the discussions of the War Committee on 23 March 1916 show, no less than his colleagues cynical of the arrangements his department had let itself become committed to negotiating. And, what was worse, he did not even properly understand them, as his minute of June 1916 admits, commenting on British undertakings in Mesopotamia about which he did not 'have a clear head’.")

Historians have used an excerpt from a private letter sent on 4 December 1915 by McMahon halfway through the eight-month period of the correspondence as evidence of possible British duplicity:

[I do not take] the idea of a future strong united independent Arab State ... too seriously ... the conditions of Arabia do not and will not for a very long time to come, lend themselves to such a thing ... I do not for one moment go to the length of imagining that the present negotiations will go far to shape the future form of Arabia or to either establish our rights or to bind our hands in that country. The situation and its elements are much too nebulous for that. What we have to arrive at now is to tempt the Arab people into the right path, detach them from the enemy and bring them on to our side. This on our part is at present largely a matter of words, and to succeed we must use persuasive terms and abstain from academic haggling over conditions—whether about Baghdad or elsewhere. (Note: Letter from McMahon to Hardinge, 4 December 1915, Hardinge Papers, vol. 94; quoted in and)

The ten letters are summarised in the table below, from the letters published in full in 1939 as Cmd. 5957:

No.	From, To, Date	Summary
1.	Hussein to McMahon, (Note: The 1939 British publication of the letter describes it as a letter from Hussein to McMahon, but with a footnote stating: "Undated and unsigned, but enclosed in an unsigned personal letter dated 2nd Ramadan, 1333 (14th July, 1915), from the Sherif to Mr. Storrs". Kedouri notes that "The first letter in the correspondence came from Mecca, but it was not written by Husayn or addressed to McMahon. Dated 14 July 1915 and received in Egypt on 18 August, it was addressed to Ronald Storrs, oriental secretary at the British residency in Cairo, and it came from Abdullah, second son of the Sharif."); 14 Jul 1915	Boundaries: Consistent with the Damascus Protocol, requested "England to acknowledge the independence of the Arab countries, bounded on the North by Mersina and Adana up to 37 degrees of latitude, on which degree fall Birijik, Urfa, Mardin, Midiat, Jerizat (Ibn `Umar), Amadia, up to the border of Persia; on the east by the borders of Persia up to the Gulf of Basra; on the South by the Indian Ocean, with the exception of the position of Aden to remain as it is; on the west by the Red Sea, the Mediterranean Sea up to Mersina." Caliphate: Requested England to "approve of the proclamation of an Arab Khalifate of Islam."; Other: In return, England to have economic preference in Arab countries, with other foreign privileges in Arab countries being abolished. Both sides to agree to a mutual defense pact and to remain neutral should the other party begin a conflict of aggression.
2.	McMahon to Hussein, 30 Aug 1915	Confirmed British "desire for the independence of Arabia and its inhabitants, together with our approval of the Arab Khalifate"
3.	Hussein to McMahon, 9 Sep 1915	Reiterated the importance of agreeing the "limits and boundaries", such that the negotiations "are dependent only on your refusal or acceptance of the question of the limits and on your declaration of safeguarding their religion first and then the rest of rights from any harm or danger."
4.	McMahon to Hussein, 24 Oct 1915	Boundaries: Acknowledged the importance of agreeing limits, stating "The two districts of Mersina and Alexandretta and portions of Syria lying to the west of the districts of Damascus, Homs, Hama and Aleppo cannot be said to be purely Arab, and should be excluded from the limits demanded... As for those regions lying within those frontiers wherein Great Britain is free to act without detriment to the interests of her ally, France... Great Britain is prepared to recognise and support the independence of the Arabs in all the regions within the limits demanded by the Sherif of Mecca." Other: Promised to protect the Holy Places, provide advice and assistance on government, with an understanding that only Britain will play such a role. Stipulated an exception for the vilayets of Bagdad and Basra allowing "special administrative arrangements" for Britain.
5.	Hussein to McMahon, 5 Nov 1915	"Vilayets of Mersina and Adana": "we renounce our insistence on the inclusion" "[T]wo Vilayets of Aleppo and Beirut and their seacoasts": refusing the exclusion since they "are purely Arab Vilayets, and there is no difference between a Moslem and a Christian Arab" "Iraqi Vilayets": noted that "we might agree to leave under the British troops ... against a suitable sum paid as compensation to the Arab Kingdom for the period of occupation." Other: The remainder of the letter discusses Arab apprehension over the speed of any revolt, in the context of the risk that the allies were to sue for peace with the Ottomans.
6.	McMahon to Hussein, 14 Dec 1915	"Vilayets of Mersina and Adana": Acknowledged agreement. "Vilayets of Aleppo and Beirut": "as the interests of our ally, France, are involved in them both, the question will require careful consideration and a further communication on the subject will be addressed to you in due course." "Vilayet of Bagdad": Proposed to postpone discussion Other: Responds to apprehension on timing with confirmation that Britain "has no intention of concluding any peace in terms of which the freedom of the Arab peoples from German and Turkish domination does not form an essential condition."
7.	Hussein to McMahon, 1 Jan 1916	"Iraq": proposes to agree compensation after the war "[T]he northern parts and their coasts": refuses further modifications, stating "it is impossible to allow any derogation that gives France, or any other Power, a span of land in those regions."
8.	McMahon to Hussein, 25 Jan 1916	Acknowledged Hussein's prior points.
9.	Hussein to McMahon, 18 Feb 1916	Discussed initial preparations for the revolt. Appealed to McMahon for £50,000 in gold plus weapons, ammunition and food claiming that Feisal was awaiting the arrival of ‘not less than 100,000 people’ for the planned revolt.
10.	McMahon to Hussein, 10 Mar 1916	Discussed initial preparations for the revolt. Confirmed British agreement to the requests and concluded the ten letters of the correspondence. The Sharif set a tentative date for armed revolt for June 1916 and commenced tactical discussions with the British High Commissioner in Egypt, Sir Henry McMahon.

=== Legal status ===
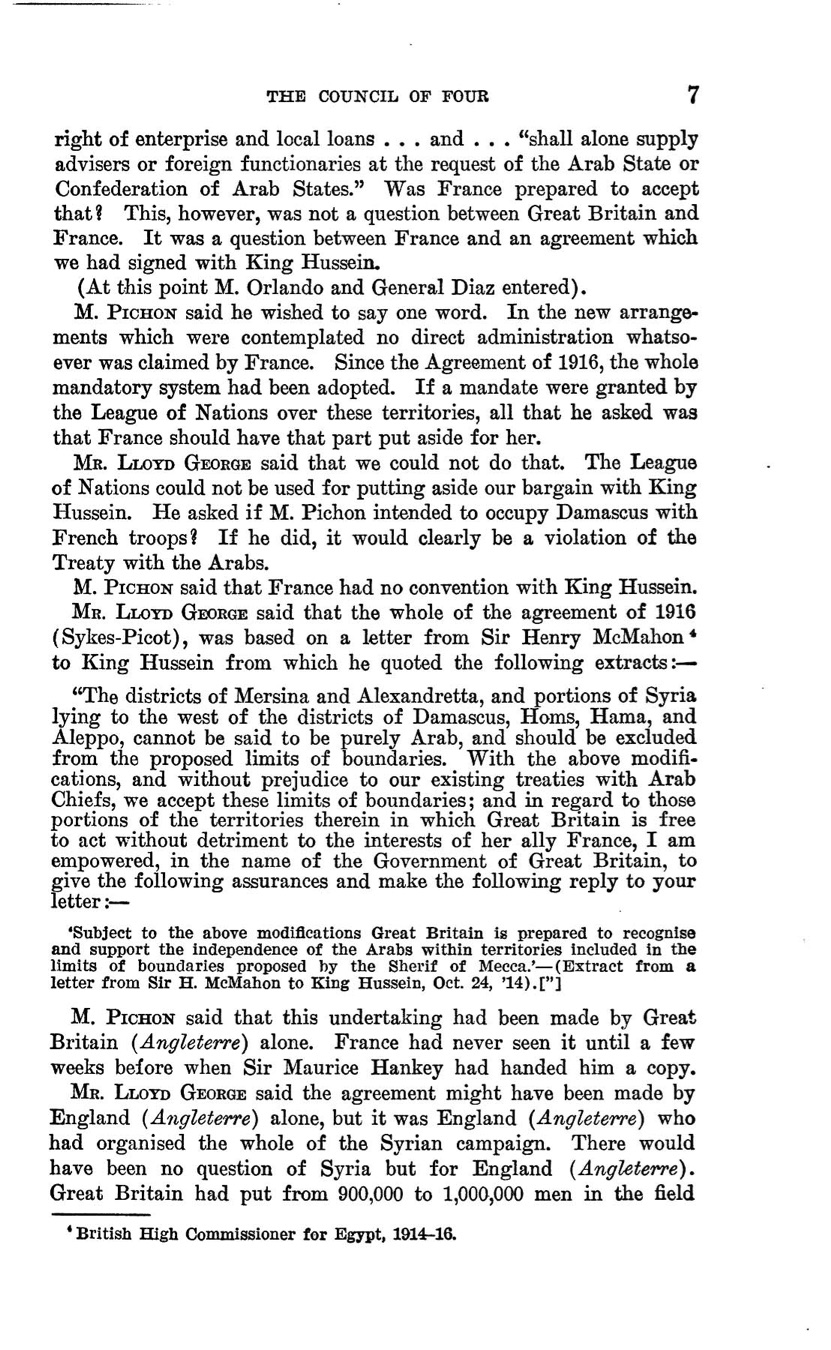
Minutes of the Paris Peace Conference 1919. The correspondence was described by David Lloyd George as "the Treaty with the Arabs"

Elie Kedourie said the October letter was not a treaty and that even if it was considered to be a treaty, Hussein failed to fulfil his promises from his 18 February 1916 letter. Arguing to the contrary, Victor Kattan describes the correspondence as a "secret treaty" and references The Secret Treaties of History that includes the correspondence. He also argues the UK government considered it to be a treaty during the 1919 Paris Peace Conference negotiations with the French over the disposal of Ottoman territory.

== Arab Revolt, June 1916 to October 1918 ==
McMahon's promises were seen by the Arabs as a formal agreement between themselves and the United Kingdom. British Prime Minister David Lloyd George and Foreign Secretary Arthur Balfour represented the agreement as a treaty during the post-war deliberations of the Council of Four. On this understanding the Arabs, under the command of Hussein's son Faisal, established a military force that fought, with inspiration from T. E. Lawrence ("Lawrence of Arabia"), against the Ottoman Empire during the Arab Revolt. In an intelligence memo written in January 1916 Lawrence described Sherif Hussein's Arab Revolt as:

beneficial to us, because it marches with our immediate aims, the break up of the Islamic 'bloc' and the defeat and disruption of the Ottoman Empire, and because the states [Sharif Hussein] would set up to succeed the Turks would be … harmless to ourselves … The Arabs are even less stable than the Turks. If properly handled they would remain in a state of political mosaic, a tissue of small jealous principalities incapable of cohesion (emphasis in original).

In June 1916, the Arab Revolt began when an Arab army moved against Ottoman forces. They participated in the capture of Aqabah and the severing of the Hejaz railway, a strategic link through the Arab peninsula that ran from Damascus to Medina. Meanwhile, the Egyptian Expeditionary Force under the command of General Allenby advanced into the Ottoman territories of Palestine and Syria. The British advance culminated in the Battle of Megiddo in September 1918 and the capitulation of the Ottoman Empire on 31 October 1918.

The Arab revolt is seen by historians as the first organized movement of Arab nationalism. It brought together Arab groups with the common goal to fight for independence from the Ottoman Empire for the first time. Much of the history of Arabian independence stemmed from the revolt beginning with the kingdom founded by Hussein. After the war was over, the Arab revolt had implications. Groups of people were classified according to whether they had fought in the revolt or and their ranks. In Iraq, a group of Sharifian officers from the Arab Revolt formed a political party of which they were head. The Hashemite kingdom in Jordan is still influenced by the actions of Arab leaders in the revolt.

== Related commitments, May 1916 to November 1918 ==
=== Sykes–Picot Agreement ===
The Sykes–Picot Agreement between the UK and France was negotiated from the end of November 1915 until its agreement in principle on 3 January 1916. The French government became aware of the UK's correspondence with Hussein during December 1915 but were not aware formal commitments had been made.

The agreement was exposed in December 1917; it was made public by the Bolsheviks after the Russian Revolution, showing the countries were planning to split and occupy parts of the promised Arab country. Hussein was satisfied by two disingenuous telegrams from Sir Reginald Wingate, who had replaced McMahon as High Commissioner of Egypt, assuring him the British commitments to the Arabs were still valid and that the Sykes–Picot Agreement was not a formal treaty. After the Sykes-Picot Agreement was published by the Russian government, McMahon resigned.

Many sources contend the Sykes-Picot Agreement conflicted with the Hussein–McMahon Correspondence of 1915–1916. There were several points of difference, the most obvious being that Persia was placed in the British area and less obviously, the idea British and French advisors would be in control of the area designated as an Arab State. While the correspondence does not mention Palestine, Haifa and Acre were to be British and a reduced Palestine area was to be internationalized.

=== Balfour Declaration ===
In 1917, the UK issued the Balfour Declaration, promising to support the establishment of a national home for the Jewish people in Palestine. The declaration and the correspondence, as well as the Sykes-Picot agreement, are frequently considered together by historians because of the potential for incompatibility between them, particularly in regard to the disposition of Palestine. According to Albert Hourani, founder of the Middle East Centre at St Antony's College, Oxford, "the argument about the interpretation of these agreements is one which is impossible to end, because they were intended to bear more than one interpretation".

=== Hogarth message ===
Hussein asked for an explanation of the Balfour Declaration and in January 1918 Commander David Hogarth, head of the Arab Bureau in Cairo, was dispatched to Jeddah to deliver a letter that was written by Sir Mark Sykes on behalf of the UK government to Hussein, who was now King of Hejaz. The Hogarth message assured Hussein "the Arab race shall be given full opportunity of once again forming a nation in the world" and referred to " ... the freedom of the existing population both economic and political ...". According to Isaiah Friedman and Kedourie, Hussein accepted the Balfour Declaration while Charles D. Smith said both Friedman and Kedourie misrepresent documents and violate scholarly standards to reach their conclusions. Hogarth reported that Hussein "would not accept an independent Jewish State in Palestine, nor was I instructed to warn him that such a state was contemplated by Great Britain".

=== Declaration to the Seven ===
In light of the existing McMahon–Hussein correspondence and in the wake of the seemingly Zionist-favourable Balfour Declaration, as well as Russia's publication weeks later of the older and previously secret Sykes–Picot Agreement with Russia and France, seven Syrian notables in Cairo from the newly formed Syrian Party of Unity (Hizb al-Ittibad as-Suri) issued a memorandum requesting clarification from the UK Government, including a "guarantee of the ultimate independence of Arabia". In response, issued on 16 June 1918, the Declaration to the Seven stated that British policy was that the future government of the regions of the Ottoman Empire that were occupied by Allied forces in World War I should be based on the consent of the governed.

=== Allenby's assurance to Faisal ===
On 19 October 1918, General Allenby reported to the UK Government that he had given Faisal:

official assurance that whatever measures might be taken during the period of military administration they were purely provisional and could not be allowed to prejudice the final settlement by the peace conference, at which no doubt the Arabs would have a representative. I added that the instructions to the military governors would preclude their mixing in political affairs, and that I should remove them if I found any of them contravening these orders. I reminded the Amir Faisal that the Allies were in honour bound to endeavour to reach a settlement in accordance with the wishes of the peoples concerned and urged him to place his trust whole-heartedly in their good faith.

=== Anglo-French Declaration of 1918 ===
In the Anglo-French Declaration of 7 November 1918 the two governments stated that:

The object aimed at by France and the United Kingdom in prosecuting in the East the War let loose by the ambition of Germany is the complete and definite emancipation of the peoples so long oppressed by the Turks and the establishment of national governments and administrations deriving their authority from the initiative and free choice of the indigenous populations.

According to civil servant Eyre Crowe, who saw the original draft of the Declaration, "we had issued a definite statement against annexation in order (1) to quiet the Arabs and (2) to prevent the French annexing any part of Syria". The Declaration is considered by historians to have been misleading at best. (Note: Paris wrote: "The Anglo-French Declaration has been described as ‘a piece of humbug as sickening as it was false’. Clearly, neither Britain nor France had the slightest intention of establishing ‘national governments’ based on free choice; they intended to control Mesopotamia and Syria plain and simple. But the Declaration was met with rejoicing in the Middle East, as Arabs fixed on the latter phrases and chose to ignore the caveat that the Allies would provide ‘support’ and ‘adequate assistance’. This was the hook, subtle and oblique, that would enable continued Anglo-French rule in the region. At a minimum, the Declaration was misleading.")

== Post-War outcome, 1919 to 1925 ==
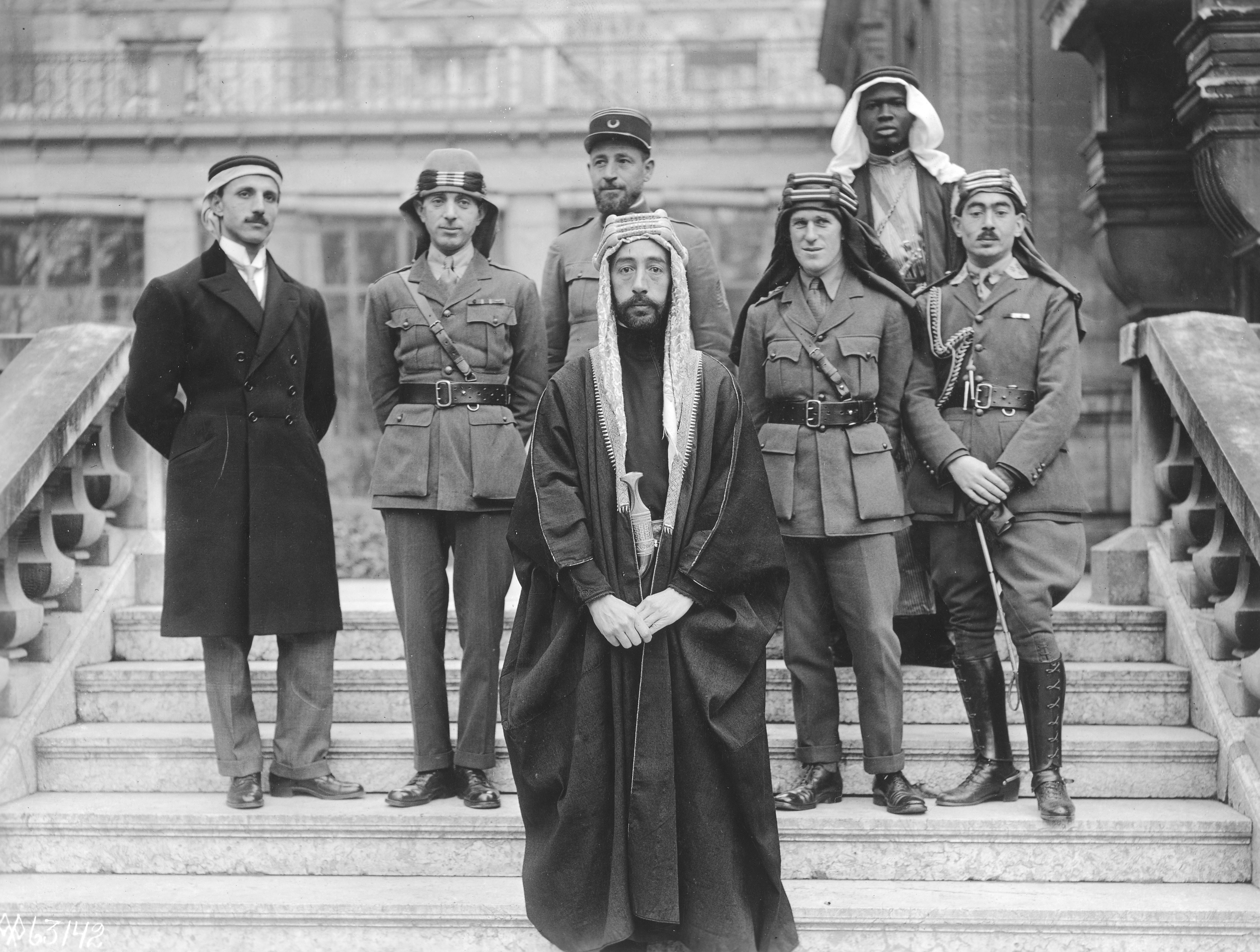
Emir Faisal's party at Versailles, during the Paris Peace Conference of 1919. At the centre, from left to right: Rustum Haidar, Nuri as-Said, Prince Faisal, Captain Pisani (behind Faisal), T. E. Lawrence (known as "Lawrence of Arabia"), unknown, Captain Tahsin Qadri.

=== Sherifian Plan ===
One day before the end of the war with the Ottomans, the British Foreign Office discussed T.E. Lawrence's "Sherifian Plan", in which Hussein's sons were proposed as puppet monarchs in Syria and Mesopotamia. (Note: Paris wrote: "At the 29 October meeting of the Eastern Committee Lawrence advanced his plan for the post-war East... Lawrence’s plan—the first proposal for a Sherifian solution for the post-war East—was supported by the Foreign Office, but roundly criticized by the India Office, which denounced ‘King Husain and his scheming sons’... Primary responsibility for the adoption of a Sherifian solution for Mesopotamia can be attributed to two men, Churchill and Lawrence. Churchill was no expert in Middle Eastern matters. He admitted as much. His knowledge, such as it was, came from his advisers, chiefly Lawrence and Young, both proponents of the Sherifian plan... Lawrence conceived the Sherifian plan and was its greatest promoter after the war. From October 1918, when he first proposed Hashemite rule before the Eastern Committee, until August 1921, when Faisal was crowned in Baghdad, he was relentless in his support of Faisal, first for Syria and then for Mesopotamia.") Part of the rationale was to satisfy a belief among the British public that a debt was owed to the Hashemites under the McMahon correspondence. (Note: Paris wrote: "The choice of a Hashemite prince for Mesopotamia had much to recommend it from both the British and Arab standpoints. For Britain, the selection of a Hashemite would satisfy many at home who believed Britain owed a debt to the Sherif for his wartime alliance with the Entente, an alliance which undercut the Sultan's call for jihad and helped win the war in the East. True, McMahon did not promise Hashemite rule in Baghdad, and even his acknowledgement of eventual Arab rule was qualified by the stipulation that Britain would implement 'special administrative arrangements' in Mesopotamia. But the sense, the palpable feeling, that Britain owed a debt to its Hashemite allies was real enough, and found frequent expression in press and Parliament in 1919–20.") Of Hussein's sons, Faisal was Lawrence's clear favourite, (Note: Paris wrote: "In very large measure this unanimity of opinion was due to the efforts of Lawrence. He may have harboured private reservations concerning Faisal, but in public, Lawrence was the Amir's most avid and influential supporter. He was responsible for Faisal's appearance in Paris as the Arab representative to the Peace Conference. He introduced Faisal to every significant political figure at Versailles. He skilfully exploited his contacts in Whitehall, in the press and in Parliament, all for the purpose of advancing the Amir's cause and removing any barriers to his eventual rule in the Middle East. And he used his own growing fame to inflate Faisal's stature as a war hero. Small wonder the French claimed that Faisal was an 'invention' of Colonel Lawrence.") while Ali was not considered a strong leader; Zaid was considered to be too young, and Abdullah was considered to be lazy. (Note: Paris wrote: "Among the Hashemites the choices were limited. For reasons discussed in Part IV below, no one wanted to extend Husain's de facto rule beyond the Hijaz. Zaid was too young. Ali was thought not to be good leadership material and, in any event, was slated to succeed his father in the Hijaz. Abdullah was the only choice until July 1920, when Faisal was ousted by the French from Syria. Lawrence had recommended Abdullah in October 1918. But he did so only because he thought Faisal was destined to remain in Syria. In fact, Abdullah was not highly regarded. His reputation had plummeted as a result of a wartime performance universally regarded as very poor. The records of the Cabinet, India, Foreign and War Offices disclose a curious repetition of the same pejoratives to describe the Amir: 'indolent', 'lazy', 'idle', 'weak' and 'fond of pleasure' appear repeatedly in official descriptions of Abdullah. And no better proof of the preference for Faisal over Abdullah can be provided than the general and widespread promotion of Faisal for Mesopotamia within days of his expulsion from Syria.")

=== Mandates ===
The Paris Peace Conference between the allies to agree territorial divisions after the war was held in 1919. The correspondence was primarily relevant to the regions that were to become Palestine, Transjordan, Lebanon, Syria, Mesopotamia (Iraq) and the Arabian Peninsula. At the conference, Prince Faisal, speaking on behalf of King Hussein, did not ask for immediate Arab independence but recommended an Arab state under a British mandate.

On 6 January 1920, Prince Faisal initialed an agreement with French Prime Minister Georges Clemenceau that acknowledged "the right of the Syrians to unite to govern themselves as an independent nation." A Pan-Syrian Congress, meeting in Damascus, declared an independent state of Syria on 8 March 1920. The new state included portions of Syria, Palestine and northern Mesopotamia, which under the Sykes–Picot Agreement had been set aside for an independent Arab state or confederation of states. Faisal was declared the head of state as king. The April 1920 the San Remo conference was hastily convened in response to Faisal's declaration. At the conference, the Allied Supreme Council granted the mandates for Palestine and Mesopotamia to Britain, and those for Syria and Lebanon to France.

The United Kingdom and France agreed to recognize the provisional independence of Syria and Mesopotamia. Provisional recognition of Palestinian independence was not mentioned. France had decided to govern Syria directly and took action to enforce the French Mandate of Syria before the terms had been accepted by the Council of the League of Nations. The French intervened militarily at the Battle of Maysalun in June 1920, deposing the indigenous Arab government and removing King Faisal from Damascus in August 1920. In Palestine, the United Kingdom appointed a High Commissioner and established their own mandatory regime. The January 1919 Faisal–Weizmann Agreement was a short-lived agreement for Arab–Jewish cooperation on the development of a Jewish homeland in Palestine, which Faisal had mistakenly understood was to be within the Arab kingdom. (Note: Ali Allawi explained this as follows: "When Faisal left the meeting with Weizmann to explain his actions to his advisers who were in a nearby suite of offices at the Carlton Hotel, he was met with expressions of shock and disbelief. How could he sign a document that was written by a foreigner in favour of another foreigner in English in a language of which he knew nothing? Faisal replied to his advisers as recorded in ‘Awni ‘Abd al-Hadi’s memoirs, "You are right to be surprised that I signed such an agreement written in English. But I warrant you that your surprise will disappear when I tell you that I did not sign the agreement before I stipulated in writing that my agreement to sign it was conditional on the acceptance by the British government of a previous note that I had presented to the Foreign Office … [This note] contained the demand for the independence of the Arab lands in Asia, starting from a line that begins in the north at Alexandretta-Diyarbakir and reaching the Indian Ocean in the south. And Palestine, as you know, is within these boundaries … I confirmed in this agreement before signing that I am not responsible for the implementation of anything in the agreement if any modification to my note is allowed.") Faisal did treat Palestine differently in his presentation to the Peace Conference on 6 February 1919, saying, "Palestine, in consequence of its universal character, be left on one side for the mutual consideration of all parties concerned."

The agreement was never implemented. (Note: Although it was noted by UNSCOP that "To many observers at the time, conclusion of the Feisal-Weizmann Agreement promised well for the future co-operation of Arab and Jew in Palestine." and further referring to the 1937 report of the Palestine Royal Commission which noted that "Not once since 1919 had any Arab leader said that co-operation with the Jews was even possible" despite expressed hopes to the contrary by British and Zionist representatives.) At the same conference, US Secretary of State Robert Lansing had asked Dr. Weizmann if the Jewish national home meant the establishment of an autonomous Jewish government. The head of the Zionist delegation had replied in the negative. (Note: Weizmann's reply to Lansing was as follows: "Dr. Weizmann replied in the negative. The Zionist organisation did not want an autonomous Jewish Government, but merely to establish in Palestine, under a mandatory Power, an administration, not necessarily Jewish, which would render it possible to send into Palestine 70 to 80,000 Jews annually. The Association would require to have permission at the same time to build Jewish schools, where Hebrew would be taught, and in that way to build up gradually a nationality which would be as Jewish as the French nation was French and the British nation British. Later on, when the Jews formed the large majority, they would be ripe to establish such a Government as would answer to the state of the development of the country and to their ideals.") Lansing was a member of the American Commission to Negotiate Peace at Paris in 1919; he said the system of mandates was a device created by the Great Powers to conceal their division of the spoils of war under the colour of international law. If the territories had been ceded directly, the value of the former German and Ottoman territories would have been applied to offset the Allies' claims for war reparations. He also said Jan Smuts had been the author of the original concept. (Note: Lansing wrote: If the advocates of the system intended to avoid through its operation the appearance of taking enemy territory as the spoils of war, it was a subterfuge which deceived no one. It seemed obvious from the very first that the Powers, which under the old practice would have obtained sovereignty over certain conquered territories, would not be denied mandates over those territories. The League of Nations might reserve in the mandate a right of supervision of administration and even of revocation of authority, but that right would be nominal and of little, if any, real value provided the mandatory was one of the Great Powers as it undoubtedly would be. The almost irresistible conclusion is that the protagonists of the theory saw in it a means of clothing the League of Nations with an apparent usefulness which justified the League by making it the guardian of uncivilized and semi-civilized peoples and the international agent to watch over and prevent any deviation from the principle of equality in the commercial and industrial development of the mandated territories. It may appear surprising that the Great Powers so readily gave their support to the new method of obtaining an apparently limited control over the conquered territories, and did not seek to obtain complete sovereignty over them. It is not necessary to look far for a sufficient and very practical reason. If the colonial possessions of Germany had, under the old practice, been divided among the victorious Powers and been ceded to them directly in full sovereignty, Germany might justly have asked that the value of such territorial cessions be applied on any war indemnities to which the Powers were entitled. On the other hand, the League of Nations in the distribution of mandates would presumably do so in the interests of the inhabitants of the colonies and the mandates would be accepted by the Powers as a duty and not to obtain new possessions. Thus under the mandatory system Germany lost her territorial assets, which might have greatly reduced her financial debt to the Allies, while the latter obtained the German colonial possessions without the loss of any of their claims for indemnity. In actual operation the apparent altruism of the mandatory system worked in favor of the selfish and material interests of the Powers which accepted the mandates. And the same may be said of the dismemberment of Turkey. It should not be a matter of surprise, therefore, that the President found little opposition to the adoption of his theory, or, to be more accurate, of the Smuts theory, on the part of the European statesmen.)

=== Hussein's downfall ===
In 1919, King Hussein had refused to ratify the Treaty of Versailles. After February 1920, the British ceased to pay subsidy to him. In August 1920, five days after the signing of the Treaty of Sèvres, which formally recognized the Kingdom of Hejaz, Curzon asked Cairo to procure Hussein's signature to both treaties and agreed to make a payment of £30,000 conditional on signature. Hussein declined and in 1921, stated that he could not be expected to "affix his name to a document assigning Palestine to the Zionists and Syria to foreigners."

Following the 1921 Cairo Conference, Lawrence was sent to try and obtain the King's signature to a treaty in exchange for a proposed £100,000 annual subsidy; this attempt also failed. During 1923, the British again tried to settle outstanding issues with Hussein; this attempt also failed and Hussein continued refusing to recognize any of the mandates he perceived as being his domain. In March 1924, having briefly considered the possibility of removing the offending article from the treaty, the UK government suspended negotiations and within six months withdrew support in favour of its central Arabian ally Ibn Saud, who proceeded to conquer Hussein's kingdom.

== Territorial reservations and Palestine ==
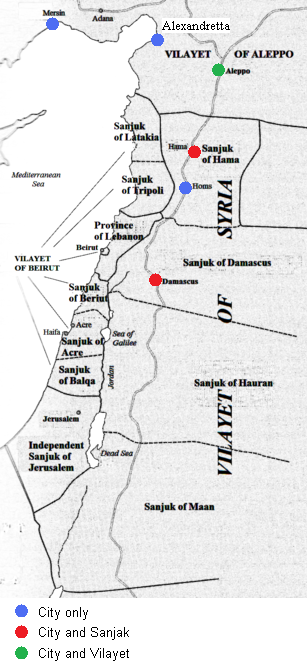
"Districts" according to the McMahon letter and their administrative category in the Ottoman Empire

McMahon's letter to Hussein dated 24 October 1915 declared Britain's willingness to recognize the independence of the Arabs subject to certain exemptions. The original correspondence was conducted in both English and Arabic; slightly differing English translations are extant.

The districts of Mersina and Alexandretta, and portions of Syria lying to the west of the districts of Damascus, Homs, Hama and Aleppo, cannot be said to be purely Arab, and must on that account be excepted from the proposed limits and boundaries.

With the above modification and without prejudice to our existing treaties concluded with Arab Chiefs, we accept these limits and boundaries, and in regard to the territories therein in which Great Britain is free to act without detriment to interests of her ally France, I am empowered in the name of the Government of Great Britain to give the following assurance and make the following reply to your letter:

Subject to the above modifications, Great Britain is prepared to recognize and support the independence of the Arabs within the territories in the limits and boundaries proposed by the Sherif of Mecca.

The correspondence was written first in English before being translated to Arabic and vice versa; the identity of the writer and translator is unclear. Kedourie and others assumed the likeliest candidate for primary author is Ronald Storrs. In his memoirs, Storrs said the correspondence was prepared by Husayn Ruhi and then checked by Storrs. The Arab delegations to the 1939 Conference had objected to certain translations of text from Arabic to English and the Committee arranged for mutually agreeable translations that would render the English text "free from actual error".

=== "Portions of Syria" debate ===
The debate regarding Palestine arose because Palestine is not explicitly mentioned in the McMahon–Hussein Correspondence but is included within the boundaries that were initially proposed by Hussein. McMahon accepted the boundaries of Hussein "subject to modification" and suggested the modification that "portions of Syria lying to the west of the districts of Damascus, Homs, Hama and Aleppo cannot be said to be purely Arab and should be excluded". Until 1920, British government documents suggested that Palestine was intended to be part of the Arab area; their interpretation changed in 1920 leading to public disagreement between the Arabs and the British, each side producing supporting arguments for their positions based on fine details of the wording and the historical circumstances of the correspondence. Jonathan Schneer provides an analogy to explain the central dispute over the meaning:

Presume a line extending from the districts of New York, New Haven, New London, and Boston, excluding territory west from an imaginary coastal kingdom. If by districts one means "vicinity" or "environs," that is one thing with regard to the land excluded, but if one means "vilayets" or "provinces," or in the American instance "states," it is another altogether. There are no states of Boston, New London, or New Haven, just as there were no provinces of Hama and Homs, but there is a state of New York, just as there was a vilayet of Damascus, and territory to the west of New York State is different from territory to the west of the district of New York, presumably New York City and environs, just as territory to the west of the vilayet of Damascus is different from territory to the west of the district of Damascus, presumably the city of Damascus and its environs.

More than 50 years after his initial report interpreting the correspondence for the British Foreign Office, Arnold J. Toynbee published his perspectives on the continuing academic debate. (Note: Toynbee's 1970 paper was structured as a conversation with Isaiah Friedman, who had published a paper on the matter earlier that year. Toynbee summarised his conclusions: "The documents written by British officials, contesting the interpretation of McMahon's word 'wilayahs' that was made by me and, before me, by the author of the Arab Bureau's History, all date from after the time at which HMG had become sure that Britain had Palestine in her pocket... I do not think that Young's or Childs' or Mr Friedman's interpretation of McMahon's use of the word 'wilayahs' is tenable. After studying Mr Friedman's paper and writing these notes, I am inclined to think that the drafting of this letter was, not disingenuous, but hopelessly muddle-headed. Incompetence is not excusable in transacting serious and responsible public business.") Toynbee set out the logical consequences of interpreting McMahon's 'districts' or 'wilayahs' as provinces rather than vicinities:

(i) First alternative: McMahon was completely ignorant of Ottoman administrative geography. He did not know that the Ottoman vilayet of Aleppo extended westward to the coast, and he did not know that there were no Ottoman vilayets of Homs and Hama. It seems to me incredible that McMahon can have been as ill-informed as this, and that he would not have taken care to inform himself correctly when he was writing a letter in which he was making very serious commitments on HMG's account.
(ii) Second alternative: McMahon was properly acquainted with Ottoman administrative geography, and was using the word 'wilayahs' equivocally. Apropos of Damascus, he was using it to mean 'Ottoman provinces'; apropos of Homs and Hama, and Aleppo, he was using it to mean 'environs'. This equivocation would have been disingenuous, impolitic, and pointless. I could not, and still cannot, believe that McMahon behaved so irresponsibly.

=== "Without detriment to France" debate ===
In the letter of 24 October, the English version reads: " ... we accept those limits and boundaries; and in regard to those portions of the territories therein in which Great Britain is free to act without detriment to the interests of her ally France" At a meeting in Whitehall in December 1920 the English and Arabic texts of McMahon's correspondence with Sharif Husein were compared. As one official, who was present, said:

In the Arabic version sent to King Husain this is so translated as to make it appear that Gt Britain is free to act without detriment to France in the whole of the limits mentioned. This passage of course had been our sheet anchor: it enabled us to tell the French that we had reserved their rights, and the Arabs that there were regions in which they wd have eventually to come to terms with the French. It is extremely awkward to have this piece of solid ground cut from under our feet. I think that HMG will probably jump at the opportunity of making a sort of amende by sending Feisal to Mesopotamia.

James Barr wrote that although McMahon had intended to reserve the French interests, he became a victim of his own cleverness because the translator Ruhi lost the qualifying sense of the sentence in the Arabic version. (Note: In his Setting the Desert on Fire published 2 years earlier, Barr had in addition described how after being missing for nearly fifteen years, copies of the Arabic versions of the two most significant letters were found in a clear-out of Ronald Storrs’s office in Cairo. "This careless translation completely changes the meaning of the reservation, or at any rate makes the meaning exceedingly ambiguous," the Lord Chancellor admitted, in a secret legal opinion on the strength of the Arab claim circulated to the cabinet on 23 January 1939.) In a Cabinet analysis of diplomatic developments prepared in May 1917 The Hon. William Ormsby-Gore, MP, wrote:

French intentions in Syria are surely incompatible with the war aims of the Allies as defined to the Russian Government. If the self-determination of nationalities is to be the principle, the interference of France in the selection of advisers by the Arab Government and the suggestion by France of the Emirs to be selected by the Arabs in Mosul, Aleppo, and Damascus would seem utterly incompatible with our ideas of liberating the Arab nation and of establishing a free and independent Arab State. The British Government, in authorising the letters dispatched to King Hussein before the outbreak of the revolt by Sir Henry McMahon, would seem to raise a doubt as to whether our pledges to King Hussein as head of the Arab nation are consistent with French intentions to make not only Syria but Upper Mesopotamia another Tunis. If our support of King Hussein and the other Arabian leaders of less distinguished origin and prestige means anything it means that we are prepared to recognise the full sovereign independence of the Arabs of Arabia and Syria. It would seem time to acquaint the French Government with our detailed pledges to King Hussein, and to make it clear to the latter whether he or someone else is to be the ruler of Damascus, which is the one possible capital for an Arab State, which could command the obedience of the other Arabian Emirs.

Declassified British Cabinet papers include a telegram dated 18 October 1915 from Sir Henry McMahon to the Secretary of State for Foreign Affairs, Lord Grey requesting instructions. McMahon described conversations with a Muhammed Sharif al-Faruqi, a member of the Ahd party who said the British could satisfy the demands of the Syrian Nationalists for the independence of Arabia. Faroqi had said the Arabs would fight if the French attempted to occupy the cities of Damascus, Homs, Hama and Aleppo, but he thought they would accept some modification of the north-western boundaries proposed by the Sherif of Mecca. Based on these conversations, McMahon suggested the language; "In so far as Britain was free to act without detriment to the interests of her present Allies, Great Britain accepts the principle of the independence of Arabia within limits propounded by the Sherif of Mecca". Lord Grey authorized McMahon to pledge the areas requested by the Sharif subject to the reserve for the Allies.

=== Arab position ===
The Arab position was that they could not refer to Palestine because that lay well to the south of the named places. In particular, the Arabs argued the vilayet (province) of Damascus did not exist and that the district (sanjak) of Damascus only covered the area surrounding the city and that Palestine was part of the vilayet of Syria A-Sham, which was not mentioned in the exchange of letters. Supporters of this interpretation also note that during the war, thousands of proclamations were dropped in all parts of Palestine carrying a message from the Sharif Hussein on one side and a message from the British Command on the other, saying "that an Anglo-Arab agreement had been arrived at securing the independence of the Arabs". (Note: The 1939 committee wrote: "The contention that the British Government did intend Palestine to be removed from the sphere of French influence and to be included within the area of Arab independence (that is to say, within the area of future British influence) is also borne out by the measures they took in Palestine during the War. They dropped proclamations by the thousand in all parts of Palestine, which bore a message from the Sharif Husain on one side and a message from the British Command on the other, to the effect that an Anglo-Arab agreement had been arrived at securing the independence of the Arabs, and to ask the Arab population of Palestine to look upon the advancing British Army as allies and liberators and give them every assistance. Under the aegis of the British military authorities, recruiting offices were opened in Palestine to recruit volunteers for the forces of the Arab Revolt. Throughout 1916 and the greater part of 1917, the attitude of the military and political officers of the British Army was clearly based on the understanding that Palestine was destined to form part of the Arab territory which was to be constituted after the War on the basis of independent Arab governments in close alliance with Great Britain.")

=== British position ===
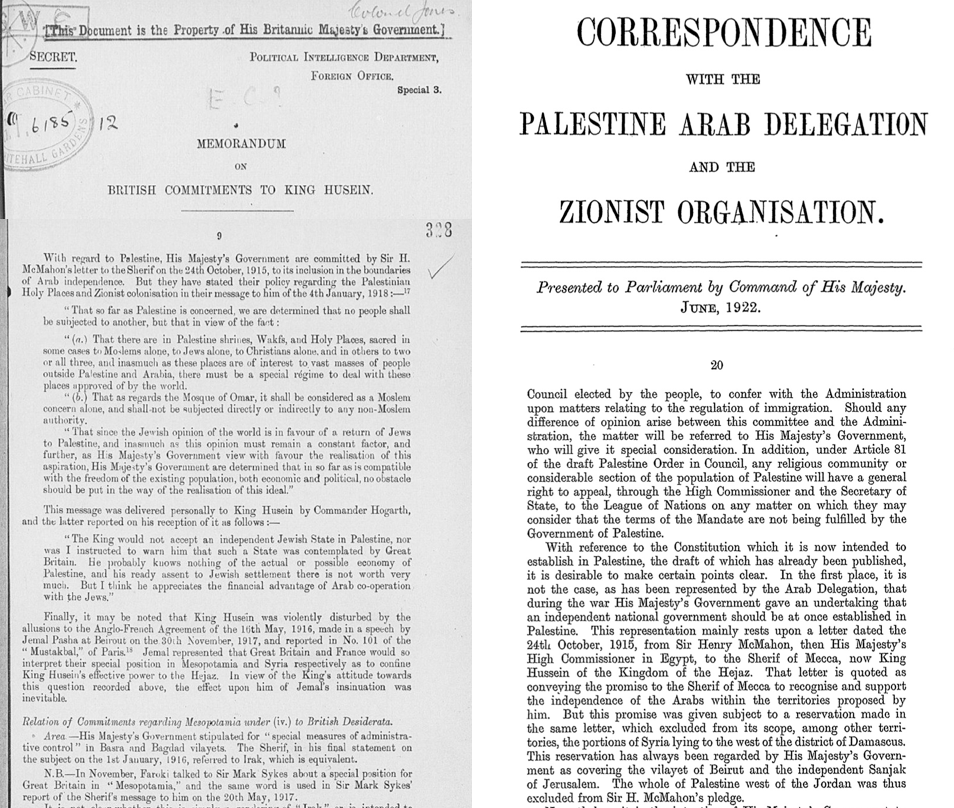
The left hand page is from CAB 24/68/86, November 1918, whilst the right hand page is from the Churchill White Paper of June 1922

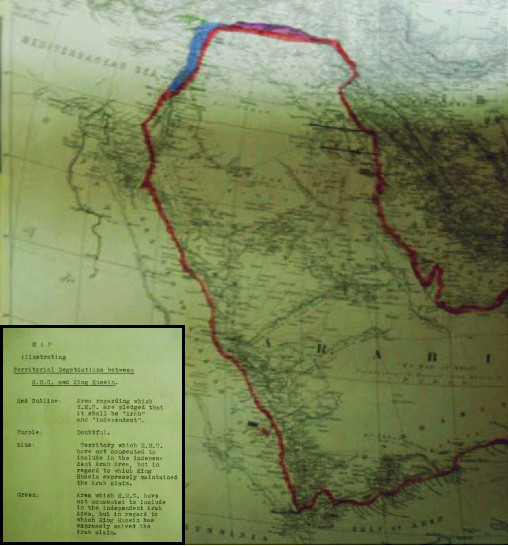
1918 British Government map entitled "Map illustrating Territorial Negotiations between H.M.G. and King Hussein"

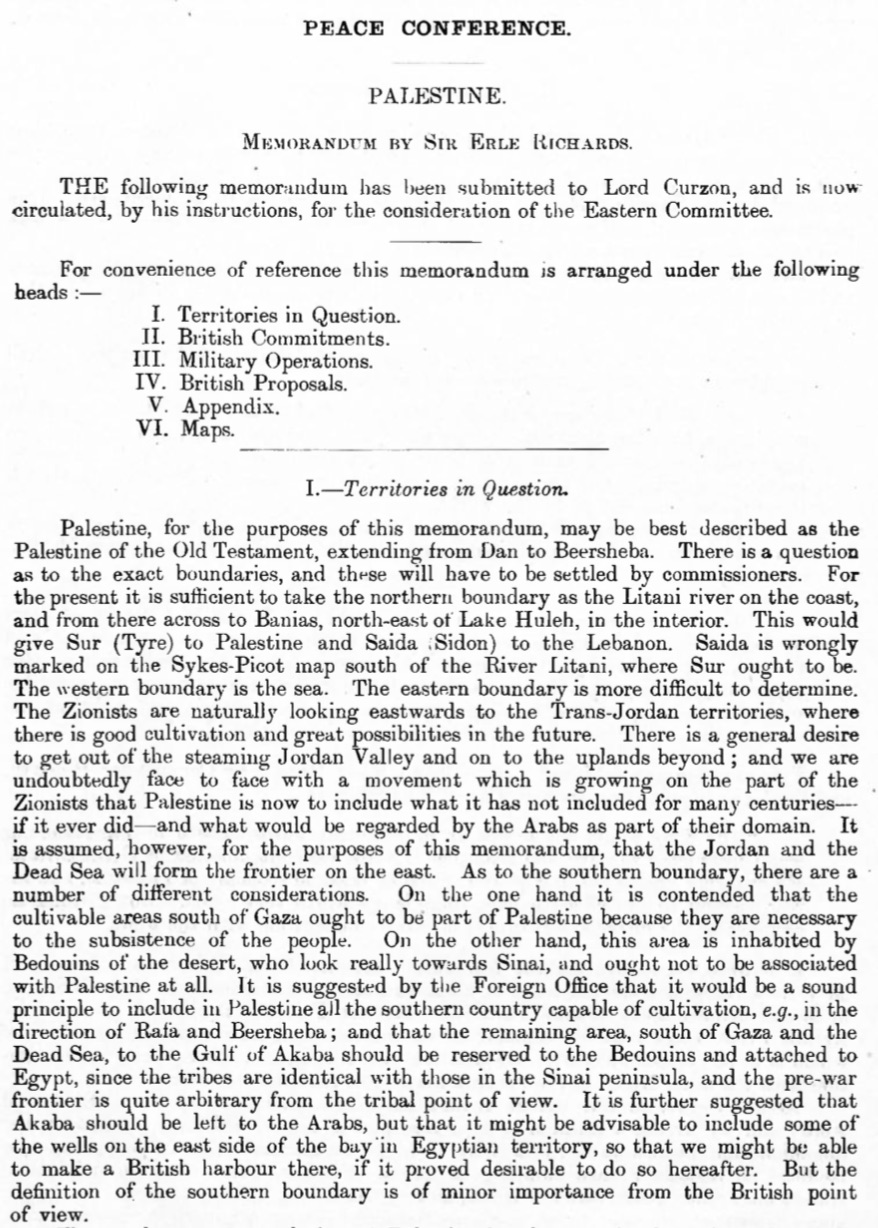
P 49 British memorandum on Palestine for 1919 Peace Conference

The interpretation of the British Government changed between 1918 and 1922.

The undated memorandum GT 6185 (from CAB 24/68/86) of November 1918 was prepared by the British historian Arnold Toynbee in 1918 while working in the Political Intelligence Department. Crowe, the Permanent Under-Secretary, ordered them to be placed in the Foreign Office dossier for the Peace Conference. After arriving in Paris, General Jan Smuts required that the memoranda be summarized and Toynbee produced the document GT 6506 (maps illustrating it are GT6506A ). The two last were circulated as E.C.2201 and considered at a meeting of the Eastern Committee (No.41) of the Cabinet on 5 December 1918, which was chaired by Lord Curzon, Jan Smuts, Lord Balfour, Lord Robert Cecil, General Sir Henry Wilson, Chief of the Imperial General Staff; representatives of the Foreign Office, the India Office, the Admiralty, the War Office, and the Treasury were present. T. E. Lawrence also attended.

The Eastern Committee met nine times in November and December to draft a set of resolutions on British policy for the benefit of the negotiators. On 21 October, the War Cabinet asked Smuts to prepare the summarized peace brief and Smuts asked Erle Richards to carry out this task. Richards distilled Toynbee's GT6506 and the resolutions of the Eastern Committee into a "P-memo" (P-49) for use by the Peace Conference delegates.

In the public arena, Balfour was criticized in the House of Commons when the Liberals and Labour Socialists moved a resolution "That secret treaties with the allied governments should be revised, since, in their present form, they are inconsistent with the object for which this country entered the war and are, therefore, a barrier to a democratic peace". In response to growing criticism arising from the seemingly contradictory commitments undertaken by the United Kingdom in the McMahon–Hussein correspondence, the Sykes–Picot Agreement and the Balfour declaration, the 1922 Churchill White Paper took the position Palestine had always been excluded from the Arab area. Although this directly contradicted numerous previous government documents, those documents were not known to the public. As part of preparations for this White Paper, Sir John Shuckberg of the British Colonial Office had exchanged correspondence with McMahon; reliance was placed on a 1920 memorandum by Major Hubert Young, who had noted that in the original Arabic text, the word translated as "districts" in English was "vilayets", the largest class of administrative district into which the Ottoman Empire was divided. He concluded "district of Damascus", i.e., "vilayet of Damascus", must have referred to the vilayet of which Damascus was the capital, the Vilayet of Syria. This vilayet extended southwards to the Gulf of Aqaba but excluded most of Palestine.

List of notable British interpretations, 1916–39, showing the debate's evolution
Source	Context	Quotation
Henry McMahon; 26 October 1915	Dispatch to British Foreign Secretary Edward Grey	"I have been definite in stating that Great Britain will recognise the principle of Arab independence in purely Arab territory... but have been equally definite in excluding Mersina, Alexandretta and those districts on the northern coasts of Syria, which cannot be said to be purely Arab, and where I understand that French interests have been recognised. I am not aware of the extent of French claims in Syria, nor of how far His Majesty's Government have agreed to recognise them. Hence, while recognising the towns of Damascus, Hama, Homs and Aleppo as being within the circle of Arab countries, I have endeavoured to provide for possible French pretensions to those places by a general modification to the effect that His Majesty's Government can only give assurances in regard to those territories "in which she can act without detriment to the interests of her ally France.""
Arab Bureau for Henry McMahon; 19 April 1916	Memorandum sent by Henry McMahon to the Foreign Office	Interpreted Palestine as being included in the Arab area:"What has been agreed to, therefore, on behalf of Great Britain is: (1) to recognise the independence of those portions of the Arab-speaking areas in which we are free to act without detriment to the interests of France. Subject to these undefined reservations the said area is understood to be bounded N. by about lat. 37, east by the Persian frontier, south by the Persian Gulf and Indian Ocean, west by the Red Sea and the Mediterranean up to about lat. 33, and beyond by an indefinite line drawn inland west of Damascus, Homs, Hama and Aleppo: all that lies between this last line and the Mediterranean being, in any case, reserved absolutely for future arrangement with the French and the Arabs."
War Office; 1 July 1916	The Sherif of Mecca and the Arab Movement	Adopted the same conclusions as the Arab Bureau memorandum of April 1916
Arab Bureau; 29 November 1916	Summary of Historical Documents: Hedjaz Rising Narrative	Included the memorandum of April 1916
Arnold J. Toynbee, Foreign Office Political Intelligence Department; November 1918 and 21 November 1918	War Cabinet Memorandum on British Commitments to King Husein; War Cabinet Memorandum Respecting Settlement of Turkey and the Arabian Peninsula	"With regard to Palestine, His Majesty's Government are committed by Sir H. McMahon's letter to the Sherif on the 24th October, 1915, to its inclusion in the boundaries of Arab independence. But they have stated their policy regarding the Palestinian Holy Places and Zionist colonisation in their message to him of the 4th January, 1918." "Palestine (west of Jordan).... (a.) We are pledged to King Husein that this territory shall be "Arab" and "independent.""
Lord Curzon; 5 Dec 1918	Chairing the Eastern Committee of the British War Cabinet	"First, as regards the facts of the case. The various pledges are given in the Foreign Office paper [E.C. 2201] which has been circulated, and I need only refer to them in the briefest possible words. In their bearing on Syria they are the following: First there was the letter to King Hussein from Sir Henry McMahon of the 24th October 1915, in which we gave him the assurance that the Hedjaz, the red area which we commonly call Mesopotamia, the brown area or Palestine, the Acre-Haifa enclave, the big Arab areas (A) and (B), and the whole of the Arabian peninsula down to Aden should be Arab and independent." "The Palestine position is this. If we deal with our commitments, there is first the general pledge to Hussein in October 1915, under which Palestine was included in the areas as to which Great Britain pledged itself that they should be Arab and independent in the future... the United Kingdom and France—Italy subsequently agreeing—committed themselves to an international administration of Palestine in consultation with Russia, who was an ally at that time... A new feature was brought into the case in November 1917, when Mr Balfour, with the authority of the War Cabinet, issued his famous declaration to the Zionists that Palestine 'should be the national home of the Jewish people, but that nothing should be done—and this, of course, was a most important proviso—to prejudice the civil and religious rights of the existing non-Jewish communities in Palestine. Those, as far as I know, are the only actual engagements into which we entered with regard to Palestine."
H. Erle Richards; January 1919	Peace Conference: Memorandum Respecting Palestine, for the Eastern Committee of the British War Cabinet, ahead of the Paris Peace Conference	"A general pledge was given to Husein in October, 1915, that Great Britain was prepared (with certain exceptions) to recognise and support the independence of the Arabs with the territories included in the limits and boundaries proposed by the Sherif of Mecca; and Palestine was within those territories. This pledge was restricted to those portions of the territories in which Great Britain was free to act without detriment to the interests of her Ally, France."
Arthur Balfour; 19 August 1919	Memorandum by Mr. Balfour respecting Syria, Palestine, and Mesopotamia	"In 1915 we promised the Arabs independence; and the promise was unqualified, except in respect of certain territorial reservations... In 1915 it was the Sherif of Mecca to whom the task of delimitation was to have been confided, nor were any restrictions placed upon his discretion in this matter, except certain reservations intended to protect French interests in Western Syria and Cilicia."
Hubert Young, of the British Foreign Office; 29 November 1920	Memorandum on Palestine Negotiations with the Hedjaz, written prior to the arrival of Faisal bin Hussein in London on 1 December 1920.	Interpreted the Arabic translation to be referring to the Vilayet of Damascus. This was the first time an argument was put forward that the correspondence was intended to exclude Palestine from the Arab area.: (Note: Kedouri wrote: "...the untruth that the government had 'always' regarded McMahon's reservation as covering the vilayet of Beirut and the sanjaq of Jerusalem, since in fact this argument was no older than Young's memorandum of November 1920") "With regard to Palestine, a literal interpretation of Sir H. McMahon's undertaking would exclude from the areas in which His Majesty's Government were prepared to recognize the 'independence of the Arabs' only that portion of the Palestine mandatory area [which included 'Transjordan '] which lies to the west of the 'district of Damascus'. The western boundary of the 'district of Damascus' before the war was a line bisecting the lakes of Huleh and Tiberias; following the course of the Jordan; bisecting the Dead Sea; and following the Wadi Araba to the Gulf of Akaba.'"
Eric Forbes Adam; October 1921	Letter to John Evelyn Shuckburgh	"On the wording of the letter alone, I think either interpretation is possible, but I personally think the context of that particular McMahon letter shows that McMahon (a) was not thinking in terms of vilayet boundaries etc., and (b) meant, as Hogarth says, merely to refer to the Syrian area where French interests were likely to be predominant and this did not come south of the Lebanon. ... Toynbee, who went into the papers, was quite sure his interpretation of the letter was right and I think his view was more or less accepted until Young wrote his memorandum."
David George Hogarth; 1921	A talk delivered in 1921	"...that Palestine was part of the area in respect to which we undertook to recognise the independence of the Arabs"
T. E. Lawrence (Lawrence of Arabia); February 1922 (first published 1926)	Autobiography: Seven Pillars of Wisdom, widely publicized (Note: Kedouri noted that Lawrence's "accusation that the British had acted in bad faith has been given a very wide currency not only by his writings, but also by Terence Rattigan's play Ross, and the Panavision technicolor film Lawrence of Arabia".)	"The Arab Revolt had begun on false pretences. To gain the Sherif's help our Cabinet had offered, through Sir Henry McMahon, to support the establishment of native governments in parts of Syria and Mesopotamia, 'saving the interests of our ally, France'. The last modest clause concealed a treaty (kept secret, till too late, from McMahon, and therefore from the Sherif) by which France, England and Russia agreed to annex some of these promised areas, and to establish their respective spheres of influence over all the rest... Rumours of the fraud reached Arab ears, from Turkey. In the East persons were more trusted than institutions. So the Arabs, having tested my friendliness and sincerity under fire, asked me, as a free agent, to endorse the promises of the British Government. I had had no previous or inner knowledge of the McMahon pledges and the Sykes-Picot treaty, which were both framed by war-time branches of the Foreign Office. But, not being a perfect fool, I could see that if we won the war the promises to the Arabs were dead paper. Had I been an honourable adviser I would have sent my men home, and not let them risk their lives for such stuff. Yet the Arab inspiration was our main tool in winning the Eastern war. So I assured them that England kept her word in letter and spirit. In this comfort they performed their fine things: but, of course, instead of being proud of what we did together, I was continually and bitterly ashamed."
Henry McMahon; 12 March 1922 and 22 July 1937	Letter to John Evelyn Shuckburgh, in preparation for the Churchill White Paper; Letter to The Times	"It was my intention to exclude Palestine from independent Arabia, and I hoped that I had so worded the letter as to make this sufficiently clear for all practical purposes. My reasons for restricting myself to specific mention of Damascus, Hama, Homs and Aleppo in that connection in my letter were: 1) that these were places to which the Arabs attached vital importance and 2) that there was no place I could think of at the time of sufficient importance for purposes of definition further South of the above. It was as fully my intention to exclude Palestine as it was to exclude the more Northern coastal tracts of Syria." "I feel it my duty to state, and I do so definitely and emphatically, that it was not intended by me in giving this pledge to King Hussein to include Palestine in the area in which Arab independence was promised. I also had every reason to believe at the time that the fact that Palestine was not included in my pledge was well understood by King Hussein."
Winston Churchill; 3 June 1922 and 11 July 1922	Churchill White Paper following the 1921 Jaffa riots House of Commons response	"In the first place, it is not the case, as has been represented by the Arab Delegation, that during the war His Majesty's Government gave an undertaking that an independent national government should be at once established in Palestine. This representation mainly rests upon a letter dated 24 October 1915, from Sir Henry McMahon, then His Majesty's High Commissioner in Egypt, to the Sharif of Mecca, now King Hussein of the Kingdom of the Hejaz. That letter is quoted as conveying the promise to the Sherif of Mecca to recognise and support the independence of the Arabs within the territories proposed by him. But this promise was given subject to a reservation made in the same letter, which excluded from its scope, among other territories, the portions of Syria lying to the west of the District of Damascus. This reservation has always been regarded by His Majesty's Government as covering the vilayet of Beirut and the independent Sanjak of Jerusalem. The whole of Palestine west of the Jordan was thus excluded from Sir. Henry McMahon's pledge." "His Majesty's Government have always regarded and continue to regard Palestine as excluded by these provisos from the scope of their undertaking. This is clear from the fact, to which the hon. Member refers, that in the following year they concluded an agreement with the French and Russian Governments under which Palestine was to receive special treatment... it would not be in the public interest to publish one or all of the documents comprising the long and inconclusive correspondence that took place with the Sheriff of Mecca in 1915–16."
Duke of Devonshire's Colonial Office; 17 February 1923	British Cabinet Memorandum regarding Policy in Palestine	"The question is: Did the excluded area cover Palestine or not? The late Government maintained that it did and that the intention to exclude Palestine was clearly under stood, both by His Majesty's Government and by the Sherif, at the time that the correspondence took place. Their view is supported by the fact that in the following year (1916) we concluded an agreement with the French and Russian Governments under which Palestine was to receive special treatment-on an international basis. The weak point in the argument is that, on the strict wording of Sir H. McMahon's letter, the natural meaning of the phrase "west of the district of Damascus" has to be somewhat strained in order to cover an area lying considerably to the south, as well as to the west, of the City of Damascus."
Duke of Devonshire; 27 March 1923	Diary of 9th Duke of Devonshire, Chatsworth MSS	"Expect we shall have to publish papers about pledges to Arabs. They are quite inconsistent, but luckily they were given by our predecessors."
Edward Grey; 27 March 1923	Debate in the House of Lords; Viscount Grey had been Foreign Secretary in 1915 when the letters were written	"I do not propose to go into the question whether the engagements are inconsistent with one another, but I think it is exceedingly probable that there are inconsistencies... A considerable number of these engagements, or some of them, which have not been officially made public by the Government, have become public through other sources. Whether all have become public I do not know, but. I seriously suggest to the Government that the best way of clearing our honour in this matter is officially to publish the whole of the engagements relating to the matter, which we entered into during the war... I regarded [the Balfour Declaration] with a certain degree of sentiment and sympathy. It is not from any prejudice with regard to that matter that I speak, but I do see that the situation is an exceedingly difficult one, when it is compared with the pledges which undoubtedly were given to the Arabs. It would be very desirable, from the point of view of honour, that all these various pledges should be set out side by side, and then, I think, the most honourable thing would be to look at them fairly, see what inconsistencies there are between them, and, having regard to the nature of each pledge and the date at which it was given, with all the facts before us, consider what is the fair thing to be done."
Lord Islington; 27 March 1923	Debate in the House of Lords	"the claim was made by the British Government to exclude from the pledge of independence the northern portions of Syria... It was described as being that territory which lay to the west of a line from the city of Damascus... up to Mersina... and, therefore, all the rest of the Arab territory would come under the undertaking... Last year Mr. Churchill, with considerable ingenuousness, of which, when in a difficult situation, he is an undoubted master, produced an entirely new description of that line."
Lord Buckmaster; 27 March 1923	Debate in the House of Lords; Buckmaster had been Lord Chancellor in 1915 when the letters were written and voted against the 1922 White Paper in the House of Lords.	"these documents show that, after an elaborate correspondence in which King Hussein particularly asked to have his position made plain and definite so that there should be no possibility of any lurking doubt as to where he stood as from that moment, he was assured that within a line that ran north from Damascus through named places, a line that ran almost due north from the south and away to the west, should be the area that should be he excluded from their independence, and that the rest should be theirs."
Gilbert Clayton; 12 April 1923	An unofficial note given to Herbert Samuel, described by Samuel in 1937, eight years after Clayton's death	"I can bear out the statement that it was never the intention that Palestine should be included in the general pledge given to the Sharif; the introductory words of Sir Henry’s letter were thought at that time—perhaps erroneously—clearly to cover that point." (Note: Samuel stated in the Lords in 1937: "Speaking to him of Lord Grey's speech, I said I wished to write to him on the subject, and he said he could tell me facts that I could communicate to Lord Grey. He gave me, quite unofficially, this note dated April 12, 1923")
Gilbert Clayton; 11 March 1919	Memorandum, 11 March 1919. Lloyd George papers F/205/3/9. House of Lords.	"We are committed to three distinct policies in Syria and Palestine:– A. We are bound by the principles of the Anglo-French Agreement of 1916 [Sykes-Picot], wherein we renounced any claim to predominant influence in Syria. B. Our agreements with King Hussein... have pledged us to support the establishment of an Arab state, or confederation of states, from which we cannot exclude the purely Arab portions of Syria and Palestine. C. We have definitely given our support to the principle of a Jewish home in Palestine and, although the initial outlines of the Zionist programme have been greatly exceeded by the proposals now laid before the Peace Congress, we are still committed to a large measure of support to Zionism. The experience of the last few months has made it clear that these three policies are incompatible ... "
Lord Passfield, Secretary of State for the Colonies; 25 July 1930	Memorandum to Cabinet: "Palestine: McMahon Correspondence"	"The question whether Palestine was included within the boundaries of the proposed Arab State is in itself extremely complicated. From an examination of Mr. Childs’s able arguments, I have formed the judgement that there is a fair case for saying that Sir H. McMahon did not commit His Majesty’s Government in this sense. But I also have come to the conclusion that there is much to be said on both sides and that the matter is one for the eventual judgement of the historian, and not one in which a simple, plain and convincing statement can be made."
Drummond Shiels, Under-Secretary of State for the Colonies; 1 August 1930	House of Commons debate	His Majesty's Government have been impressed by the feeling shown in the House of Commons on various occasions, and especially in the debate on the Adjournment on the 7th May, with regard to the correspondence which took place in 1915–16 between Sir Henry McMahon and the Sherif Husein of Mecca. They have, therefore, thought it necessary to re-examine this correspondence fully in the light of the history of the period and the interpretations which have been put upon it. There are still valid reasons, entirely unconnected with the question of Palestine, which render it in the highest degree undesirable in the public interest to publish the correspondence. These reasons may be expected to retain their force for many years to come. There are not sufficient grounds for holding that by this correspondence His Majesty's Government intended to pledge themselves, or did, in fact, pledge themselves, to the inclusion of Palestine in the projected Arab State. Sir H. McMahon has himself denied that this was his intention. The ambiguous and inconclusive nature of the correspondence may well, however, have left an impression among those who were aware of the correspondence that His Majesty's Government had such an intention.
W. J. Childs, of the British Foreign Office; 24 October 1930	Memorandum on the Exclusion of Palestine from the Area assigned for Arab Independence by McMahon–Hussein Correspondence of 1915–16	Interpreted Palestine as being excluded from the Arab area: "...the interests of France so reserved in Palestine must be taken as represented by the origins French claim to possession of the whole of Palestine. And, therefore, that the general reservation of French interests is sufficient by itself to exclude Palestine from the Arab area."
Reginald Coupland, commissioner on the Palestine Royal Commission; 5 May 1937	Explanation to the Foreign Office regarding the commission's abstention	"a reason why the Commission did not intend to pronounce upon Sir H. McMahon’s pledge was that in everything else their report was unanimous, but that upon this point they would be unlikely to prove unanimous."
George William Rendel, Head of the Eastern Department of the Foreign Office; 26 July 1937	Minute commenting on McMahon's 23 July 1937 letter	"My own impression from reading the correspondence has always been that it is stretching the interpretation of our caveat almost to breaking point to say that we definitely did not include Palestine, and the short answer is that if we did not want to include Palestine, we might have said so in terms, instead of referring vaguely to areas west of Damascus, and to extremely shadowy arrangements with the French, which in any case ceased to be operative shortly afterwards... It would be far better to recognise and admit that H.M.G. made a mistake and gave flatly contradictory promises – which is of course the fact."
Lord Halifax, Foreign Secretary; January 1939	Memorandum on Palestine: Legal Arguments Likely to be Advanced by Arab Representatives	"...it is important to emphasise the weak points in His Majesty's Governments case, e.g. :–: (i) the fact that the word "district" is applied not only to Damascus, &c., where the reading of vilayet is at least arguable, but also immediately previously to Mersina and Alexandretta. No vilayets of these names exist...and it would be difficult to argue that the word "districts" can have two completely different meanings in the space of a few lines.; (ii) the fact that Homs and Hama were not the capitals of vilayets, but were both within the Vilayet of Syria.; (iii) the fact that the real title of the "Vilayet of Damascus" was "Vilayet of Syria."; (iv) the fact that there is no land lying west of the Vilayet of Aleppo....It may be possible to produce arguments designed to explain away some of these difficulties individually (although even this does not apply in the case of (iv)), but it is hardly possible to explain them away collectively. His Majesty's Government need not on this account abjure altogether the counter-argument based on the meaning of the word "district," which have been used publicly for many years, and the more obvious defects in which do not seem to have been noticed as yet by Arab critics."
Committee Set up to Consider Certain Correspondence; 16 March 1939	Committee set up in preparation for the White Paper of 1939	"It is beyond the scope of the Committee to express an opinion upon the proper interpretation of the various statements mentioned in paragraph 19 and such an opinion could not in any case be properly expressed unless consideration had also been given to a number of other statements made during and after the war. In the opinion of the Committee it is, however, evident from these statements that His Majesty's Government were not free to dispose of Palestine without regard for the wishes and interests of the inhabitants of Palestine, and that these statements must all be taken into account in any attempt to estimate the responsibilities which—upon any interpretation of the Correspondence—His Majesty's Government have incurred towards those inhabitants as a result of the Correspondence."

1939 Committee (Cmd 5974)

While some British government officials occasionally stated that the intent of the McMahon Correspondence was not to promise Palestine to Hussein, they have occasionally acknowledged the flaws in the legal terminology of the McMahon–Hussein Correspondence that make this position problematic. The weak points of the government's interpretation were acknowledged in a detailed memorandum by the Secretary of State for Foreign Affairs in 1939. (Note: (i) the fact that the word "district" is applied not only to Damascus, &c., where the reading of vilayet is at least arguable, but also immediately previously to Mersina and Alexandretta. No vilayets of these names exist…and it would be difficult to argue that the word "districts" can have two completely different meanings in the space of a few lines. (ii) the fact that Homs and Hama were not the capitals of vilayets, but were both within the Vilayet of Syria. (iii) the fact that the real title of the "Vilayet of Damascus" was "Vilayet of Syria." (iv) the fact that there is no land lying west of the Vilayet of Aleppo. The Foreign Secretary summarized "It may be possible to produce arguments designed to explain away some of these difficulties individually (although even this does not apply in the case of (iv)), but it is hardly possible to explain them away collectively. His Majesty’s Government need not on this account abjure altogether the counter-argument based on the meaning of the word "district," which have been used publicly for many years, and the more obvious defects in which do not seem to have been noticed as yet by Arab critics".)

A committee established by the British in 1939 to clarify the arguments said many commitments had been made during and after the war and that all of them would have to be studied together. The Arab representatives submitted a statement from Sir Michael McDonnell to the committee that said whatever meaning McMahon had intended was of no legal consequence because it was his actual statements that constituted the pledge from His Majesty's Government. The Arab representatives also said McMahon had been acting as an intermediary for the Secretary of State for Foreign Affairs, Lord Grey. Speaking in the House of Lords on 27 March 1923, Lord Grey said he had serious doubts about the validity of the Churchill White Paper's interpretation of the pledges he, as Foreign Secretary, had caused to be given to the Sharif Hussein in 1915. (Note: Viscount Grey of Fallodon (McMahon’s superior when the correspondence was entered into) "A considerable number of these engagements, or some of them, which have not been officially made public by the Government, have become public through other sources. Whether all have become public I do not know, but. I seriously suggest to the Government that the best way of clearing our honour in this matter is officially to publish the whole of the engagements relating to the matter, which we entered into during the war. If they are found to be not inconsistent with one another our honour is cleared. If they turn out to be inconsistent, I 655 think it will be very much better that the amount, character and extent of the inconsistencies should be known, and that we should state frankly that, in the urgency of the war, engagements were entered into which were not entirely consistent with each other. I am sure that we cannot redeem our honour by covering up our engagements and pretending that there is no inconsistency, if there really is inconsistency. I am sure that the most honourable course will be to let it be known what the engagements are, and, if there is inconsistency, then to admit it frankly, and, admitting that fact, and having enabled people to judge exactly what is the amount of the inconsistency, to consider what is the most fair and honourable way out of the impasse into which the engagements may have led us. Without comparing one engagement with another, I think that we are placed in considerable difficulty by the Balfour Declaration itself. I have not the actual words here, but I think the noble Duke opposite will not find fault with my summary of it. It promised a Zionist home without prejudice to the civil and religious rights of the population of Palestine. A Zionist home, my Lords, undoubtedly means or implies a Zionist Government over the district in which the home is placed, and if 93 per cent. of the population of Palestine are Arabs, I do not see how you can establish other than an Arab Government, without prejudice to their civil rights. That one sentence alone of the Balfour Declaration seems to me to involve, without over-stating the case, very great difficulty of fulfilment.") The Arab representatives suggested a search for evidence in the files of the Foreign Office might clarify the Secretary of State's intentions.

== See also ==
- Pan-Arabism

== Bibliography ==
=== Specialised works ===
- Allawi, Ali A. (2014). Faisal I of Iraq. Yale University Press. pp. 216–. ISBN 978-0-300-19936-9.
- Antonius, George (1938). The Arab Awakening: The Story of the Arab National Movement. Hamish Hamilton. ISBN 978-0710306739.
- Barr, James (2011). A Line in the Sand: Britain, France and the struggle that shaped the Middle East. Simon & Schuster. p. 60. ISBN 978-1-84983-903-7.
- Bennett, G.H. (1995). British foreign Policy during the Curzon Period, 1919–24. Macmillan Press. p. 243. ISBN 978-1-349-39547-7.
- Biger, Gideon (2004). The Boundaries of Modern Palestine, 1840–1947. Psychology Press. ISBN 978-0-7146-5654-0.
- Brecher, Frank W. (1993). "French Policy toward the Levant 1914–18". Middle Eastern Studies. 29 (4): 641–663. doi:10.1080/00263209308700971. JSTOR 4283597.
- Charlwood, David J (2014). "The Impact of the Dardanelles Campaign on British Policy Towards the Arabs: How Gallipoli Shaped the Hussein-McMahon Correspondence". British Journal of Middle Eastern Studies. 42 (2): 241–252. doi:10.1080/13530194.2014.936113. S2CID 159974016.
- Dockrill; Steiner (1980). "The Foreign Office at the Paris Peace Conference in 1919". The International History Review. 2 (1): 55–86. doi:10.1080/07075332.1980.9640205.
- Kalisman, Hilary Falb (2016). "The Little Persian Agent in Palestine: Husayn Ruhi, British Intelligence, and World War I" (PDF). Institute for Palestine Studies (66): 67.
- Friedman, Isaiah (1973). The Question of Palestine: British-Jewish-Arab Relations, 1914–1918. Transaction Publishers. ISBN 978-1-4128-3868-9.
- Friedman, Isaiah (2000). Palestine, a Twice-Promised Land: The British, the Arabs & Zionism : 1915–1920. Transaction Publishers. ISBN 978-1-4128-3044-7.
- Goldstein, Erik (1987). "British Peace Aims and the Eastern Question: The Political Intelligence Department and the Eastern Committee, 1918". Middle Eastern Studies. 23 (4): 419–436. doi:10.1080/00263208708700719. JSTOR 4283203.
- Goren, Haim; Dolev, Eran; Sheffy, Yigal (2014). Palestine and World War I: Grand Strategy, Military Tactics and Culture in War. I.B. Tauris. ISBN 978-1-78076-359-0.
- Havrelock, Rachel (2011). River Jordan: The Mythology of a Dividing Line. University of Chicago Press. pp. 231–. ISBN 978-0-226-31959-9.
- Hawa, Salam (2017). The Erasure of Arab Political Identity: Colonialism and Violence. Taylor & Francis. ISBN 978-1-317-39006-0.
- Huneidi, Sahar (2001). A Broken Trust: Sir Herbert Samuel, Zionism and the Palestinians. I.B. Tauris. p. 84. ISBN 978-1-86064-172-5.
- Hadawi, Sami (1991). Bitter Harvest: A Modern History of Palestine. Olive Branch Press. ISBN 978-0-940793-81-1.
- Hourani, Albert (1981). The Emergence of the Modern Middle East. University of California Press. ISBN 978-0-520-03862-2.
- Hughes, Matthew (2013). Allenby and British Strategy in the Middle East, 1917–1919. Routledge. ISBN 978-1-136-32395-9.
- Hurewitz, J. C. (1979). The Middle East and North Africa in World Politics: A Documentary Record. British-French supremacy, 1914–1945, Vol. 2. Yale University Press. ISBN 978-0300022032.
- Ingrams, Doreen (2009). Palestine papers: 1917–1922: seeds of conflict. Eland. ISBN 978-1-906011-38-3.
- Jeffries, Joseph Mary Nagle (1939). Palestine: The Reality. Longmans, Green and Company. p. 105.
- Kattan, Victor (2009). From coexistence to conquest: international law and the origins of the Arab-Israeli conflict, 1891–1949. Pluto Press. ISBN 978-0-7453-2579-8.
- Kedouri, Elie (2014). In the Anglo-Arab Labyrinth: The McMahon-Husayn Correspondence and Its Interpretations 1914–1939. Routledge. ISBN 978-1-135-30842-1.
- Kent, Marian (1977). "Asiatic Turkey, 1914–1916". In F. H. Hinsley and Francis Harry Hinsley (ed.). British Foreign Policy Under Sir Edward Grey. Cambridge University Press. ISBN 978-0-521-21347-9.
- Khalidi, Rashid (1991). The Origins of Arab Nationalism. Columbia University Press. ISBN 978-0-231-07435-3.
- Lieshout, Robert H. (2016). Britain and the Arab Middle East: World War I and its Aftermath. I.B. Tauris. ISBN 978-1-78453-583-4.
- Lieshout, R.H. (1984). "'Keeping Better Educated Moslems Busy': Sir Reginald Wingate and the Origins of the Husayn-McMahon Correspondence". The Historical Journal. 27 (2): 453–463. doi:10.1017/S0018246X00017891. S2CID 159708580.
- Mangold, Peter (2016). What the British Did: Two Centuries in the Middle East. I.B. Tauris. ISBN 978-0857729095.
- Mathew, William M. (2011). "War-Time Contingency and the Balfour Declaration of 1917: An Improbable Regression" (PDF). Journal of Palestine Studies. 40 (2): 26–42. doi:10.1525/jps.2011.xl.2.26. JSTOR 10.1525/jps.2011.xl.2.26.
- Mousa, Suleiman (1978). "A Matter of Principle: King Hussein of the Hijaz and the Arabs of Palestine". International Journal of Middle East Studies. 9 (2): 183–194. doi:10.1017/S0020743800000052. S2CID 163677445.
- Mousa, Suleiman (1993), "Sharif Husayn and Developments Leading to the Arab Revolt", New Arabian Studies, vol. I, University of Exeter Press, pp. 49–, ISBN 978-0-85989-408-1
- Paris, Timothy J. (2003), Britain, the Hashemites, and Arab Rule, 1920–1925: The Sherifian Solution, Frank Cass, ISBN 978-0-7146-5451-5
- Prott, Volker (2016). The Politics of Self-Determination:Remaking Territories and National Identities in Europe, 1917–1923. Oxford University Press. ISBN 978-0191083549.
- Quigley, John (2010). The Statehood of Palestine: International Law in the Middle East Conflict. Cambridge University Press. pp. 11–12. ISBN 978-1-139-49124-2.
- Reid, Walter (2011). Empire of Sand: How Britain Made the Middle East. Birlinn. ISBN 978-0-85790-080-7.
- Shlaim, Avi (2009). Israel and Palestine: Reappraisals, Revisions, Refutations. Verso. ISBN 978-1-84467-366-7.
- Schneer, Jonathan (2010). The Balfour Declaration: The Origins of the Arab-Israeli Conflict. Random House. ISBN 978-1-4000-6532-5.
- Smith, Charles D. (1993). "The Invention of a Tradition The Question of Arab Acceptance of the Zionist Right to Palestine during World War I" (PDF). Journal of Palestine Studies. XXII (2): 48–61. doi:10.1525/jps.1993.22.2.00p0188v.
- Teitelbaum, Joshua (2001). The Rise and Fall of the Hashimite Kingdom of Arabia. C. Hurst & Co. Publishers. ISBN 978-1850654605.
- Wilson, Jeremy (1990). Lawrence of Arabia: The Authorized Biography of T.E. Lawrence. Atheneum. p. 1188. ISBN 978-0689119347.
- Yesilyurt, Nuri (2006). "Turning Point of Turkish Arab Relations:A Case Study on the Hijaz Revolt" (PDF). The Turkish Yearbook. XXXVII: 107–108. Archived from the original (PDF) on 12 October 2017.
- Yapp, Malcolm (1987). The Making of the Modern Near East 1792–1923. Harlow, England: Longman. ISBN 978-0-582-49380-3.

=== General histories ===
- Choueiri, Youssef M. (2001). Arab Nationalism: A History Nation and State in the Arab World. Wiley. ISBN 978-0-631-21729-9.
- Khouri, Fred John (1985). The Arab-Israeli Dilemma. Syracuse University Press. ISBN 978-0-8156-2340-3.
- Rea, Tony; Wright, John (1997). The Arab-Israeli Conflict. Oxford University Press. ISBN 978-0199171705 – via Google Books.
- Rush, Alan (1995). Records of the Hashimite dynasties: a twentieth century documentary history. Archive Editions. p. 21. ISBN 978-1-85207-590-3.

=== Works by involved parties ===
- The full text of McMahon–Hussein Correspondence at Wikisource
- Arab-British Committee (1939), Report of a Committee set up to consider certain correspondence between Sir Henry McMahon [his majesty's high commissioner in Egypt] and the Sharif of Mecca in 1915 and 1916, UNISPAL; pdf version (0.3 MB); Original pdf Archived 2 February 2021 at the Wayback Machine (7.3MB)
- McMahon, Henry; bin Ali, Hussein (1939), Cmd.5957; Correspondence between Sir Henry McMahon, G.C.M.G., His Majesty's High Commissioner at. Cairo and the Sherif Hussein of Mecca, July, 1915–March, 1916 (with map) (PDF), HMG
- Lansing, Robert (1921). "Chapter XIII 'The System of Mandates'". The Peace Negotiations. Houghton Mifflin Company.
- Palestine Royal Commission (1937), Cmd. 5479, Palestine Royal Commission Report, also known as the "Peel Report" (PDF), HMSO, "For further information see the Commission's Wikipedia article at Peel Commission"
- Storrs, Sir Ronald (June 1937). The Memoirs of Sir Ronald Storrs. G.P. Putnam’s Sons.
- Toynbee, Arnold; Friedman, Isaiah (1970). "The McMahon-Hussein Correspondence: Comments and a Reply" (PDF). Journal of Contemporary History. 5 (4): 185–201. doi:10.1177/002200947000500411. JSTOR 259872. S2CID 159516218.
- UNSCOP (1947). "United Nations Special Committee on Palestine 1947". Official Records of the Second Session of the General Assembly. United Nations.
- Council of Ten (1919), "The Council of Ten: minutes of meetings February 15 to June 17, 1919", Papers relating to the foreign relations of the United States, The Paris Peace Conference, 1919, vol. IV, United States Government Printing Office
- Council of Four (1919), "The Council of Four: minutes of meetings March 20 to May 24, 1919", Papers Relating to the Foreign Relations of the United States, The Paris Peace Conference, 1919, vol. V, United States Government Printing Office
