= African Survey =

1938 report

- Author: Malcolm Hailey, 1st Baron Hailey
- Subject: Colonial administration
- Publisher: Oxford University Press, Under the auspices of the Royal Institute of International Affairs
- Publication date: 1938 (2nd edition: 1945)
- Pages: 1,837 pp

An African Survey: A Study of Problems arising in Africa South of the Sahara, often simply known as African Survey, was a report originally published in 1938 under the auspices of The Royal Institute of International Affairs (Chatham House) which paved the way for the reorganisation of research into the situation of the British Empire in Sub-Saharan Africa through the Colonial Development and Welfare Act 1940. The report was published by Oxford University Press and ran to 1,837 pages. It was subsequently republished in several revised editions.

== Origins ==
The publication's origins arose out of a proposal by Jan Smuts in 1929 when he delivered the Rhodes Memorial Lecture at Oxford University.

The missionary Joseph Oldham played a key role in getting the survey under way. John Cell has argued that reference to Jan Smuts in Lord Lothian's foreword to the work should not be given much weight. Smuts had advocated White settlement throughout the highlands of East Africa, with a view of creating a similar dominion to South Africa. This proposal, centred on Oxford University, lost out to other viewpoints. In 1931 Oldham got an agreement for the survey to be funded from the Carnegie Foundation, however a suitable director would have to be found. Three people declined the role, William Marris, George Schuster and Whitney Shephardson before the two year search was over. Lionel Curtis, a friend of Lord Hailey sounded him out and he was soon seen as an ideal candidate for the role. Hailey formally accepted the role in July 1933.

== The production of the survey ==
As director for the Survey, Hailey became recognised as a leading voice calling for colonial reform in the 1940s. Hailey had retired from a career in British India and whilst it was officially claimed he would bring "fresh eyes" to Britain's African territories, it has also been suggested that there was a hope that a similar method of controlling separate African territories could be established as had been done in India. He was aided by Lucy Mair and Audrey Richards, both anthropology students of Bronisław Malinowski, who were seconded to the Colonial Office; E. B. Worthington, a Cambridge biologist who assisted with a scientific survey; and Hilda Matheson, who was hired as a secretary to the project, but ended up serving more as an executive manager of the endeavor.

Hailey was ill from 1937 to 1938, and much of the work was taken up by Frederick Pedler who took over editorial responsibility during this period.

One of the key points made by the report was that rather than have research develop as a piece-meal response to specific problems, it should be integrated into an overall plan with suitable funding from the treasury.

The report became a regular item to be found on administrators’ desks across colonial British Africa.

== Contents ==
The survey indicted the colonial systems and advocated for reform, particularly economic ones focussed on development. It also called for a review of the "indirect rule" system, prevalent throughout Britain's colonies.
