= British Colonial Research Committee =

The British Colonial Research Committee (or the Colonial Research Council after 1947) was an advisory organisation of the British state which existed between 1942 and 1959. 16 volumes consisting of the archives of this body are kept at The National Archive. It was established under Lord Hailey.

The Committee was established in June 1942 to offer advice on how the Secretary of State for the Colonies should spend funds allocated by the Colonial Development and Welfare Act 1940. Its role was to co-ordinate research of various sub-committees and cover any areas which came to light beyond the purview of these sub-committees. It was also inspired by the Institut Francais de l'Afrique Noire to establish regional research institutes located in colonial countries. After February 1948 This work was taken over by the Colonial Research Council. This in turn was dissolved in 1959 and replaced by the Overseas Research Council, who advised the Committee of the Privy Council on Overseas Research.

The Committee established a series of more focused committees:

- Colonial Social Science Research Council (1944)
