= Lords of the Desert =

Lords of the Desert may refer to:

- Lords of the Desert, a Palestinian criminal organization best known for kidnapping some members of the Bibas family
- Lords of the Desert, a 2018 book by James Barr
