= Malcolm Hailey, 1st Baron Hailey =

British peer and administrator

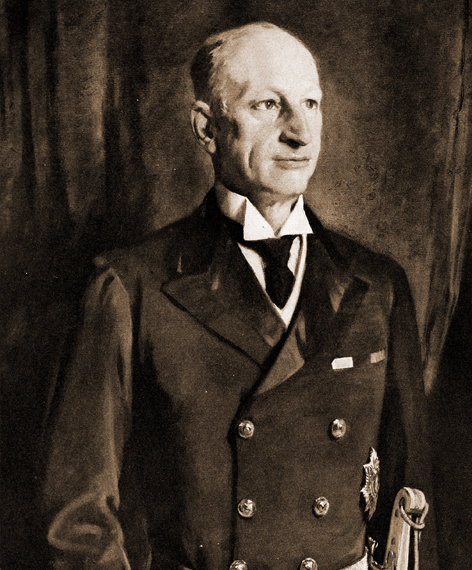
Former Governor of the Punjab

William Malcolm Hailey, 1st Baron Hailey, OM, GCSI, GCMG, GCIE, PC (15 February 1872 – 1 June 1969) known as Sir Malcolm Hailey between 1921 and 1936, was a British peer and administrator in British India.

== Early life and education ==
Malcolm Hailey was born at Newport Pagnell in 1872, to Hammet Hailey, a physician, and Maria Coelia Clode. The youngest of three brothers, he attended Merchant Taylors' School from 1883 to 1890. He subsequently earned a schlorarship to Corpus Christi College, Oxford, and there gained a first class degree in classics in 1894. In 1896 he entered the Indian Civil Service.

Hailey College of Commerce, the oldest specialized institution of commerce in Asia and a constituent institution of the University of the Punjab in Lahore, Punjab, Pakistan, is named after him. When the college was established in March 1927, Hailey was the Governor of the Punjab and the Chancellor of the university.

== Career ==
Hailey was Governor of the Punjab from 1924 to 1928, a compromiser with the Akali leadership, and Governor of the United Provinces 1928 to 1934. He was early convinced of the strength of Indian nationalism, but remained ambivalent about it.

He was appointed a CIE in 1911, a Companion of the Order of the Star of India in the 1915 Birthday Honours, a Knight Commander of the Order of the Indian Empire (KCIE) 1921 and promoted to Knight Grand Commander of the Order of the Indian Empire (GCIE) in the 1928 Birthday Honours and a Knight Grand Commander of the Order of the Star of India (GCSI) in the 1932 Birthday Honours. In the 1936 Birthday Honours, while he was the Governor of United Provinces, India's oldest national park was created and was named Hailey National Park in his honour (later renamed Jim Corbett National Park). The same year, he was raised to the peerage as Baron Hailey, of Shahpur in the Punjab and Newport Pagnell in the County of Buckingham. In 1937 he was elected President of the Royal Asiatic Society of Great Britain and Ireland. In the 1939 New Year Honours, he was made a GCMG.

He subsequently spent time on missions to Africa, producing the African Survey in 1938, a report published under the auspices of The Royal Institute of International Affairs (Chatham House) which paved the way for the reorganisation of research into the situation of the British Empire in Sub-Saharan Africa through the Colonial Development and Welfare Act 1940. He advised limited recognition of African national movements. He was invited to a meeting by the Secretary of State for the Colonies, Malcolm MacDonald, in 1939 at which the setting up of the Colonial Social Science Research Council was discussed. In 1942, he was appointed to lead the British Colonial Research Committee.

In 1949, he was made a member of the Privy Council. His powers of speaking and intellectual synthesis were widely recognised. He was appointed a member of the Order of Merit in the 1956 Birthday Honours.

Hailey also served as a Trustee of The Rhodes Trust from 1941 to 1964.

== Personal life ==
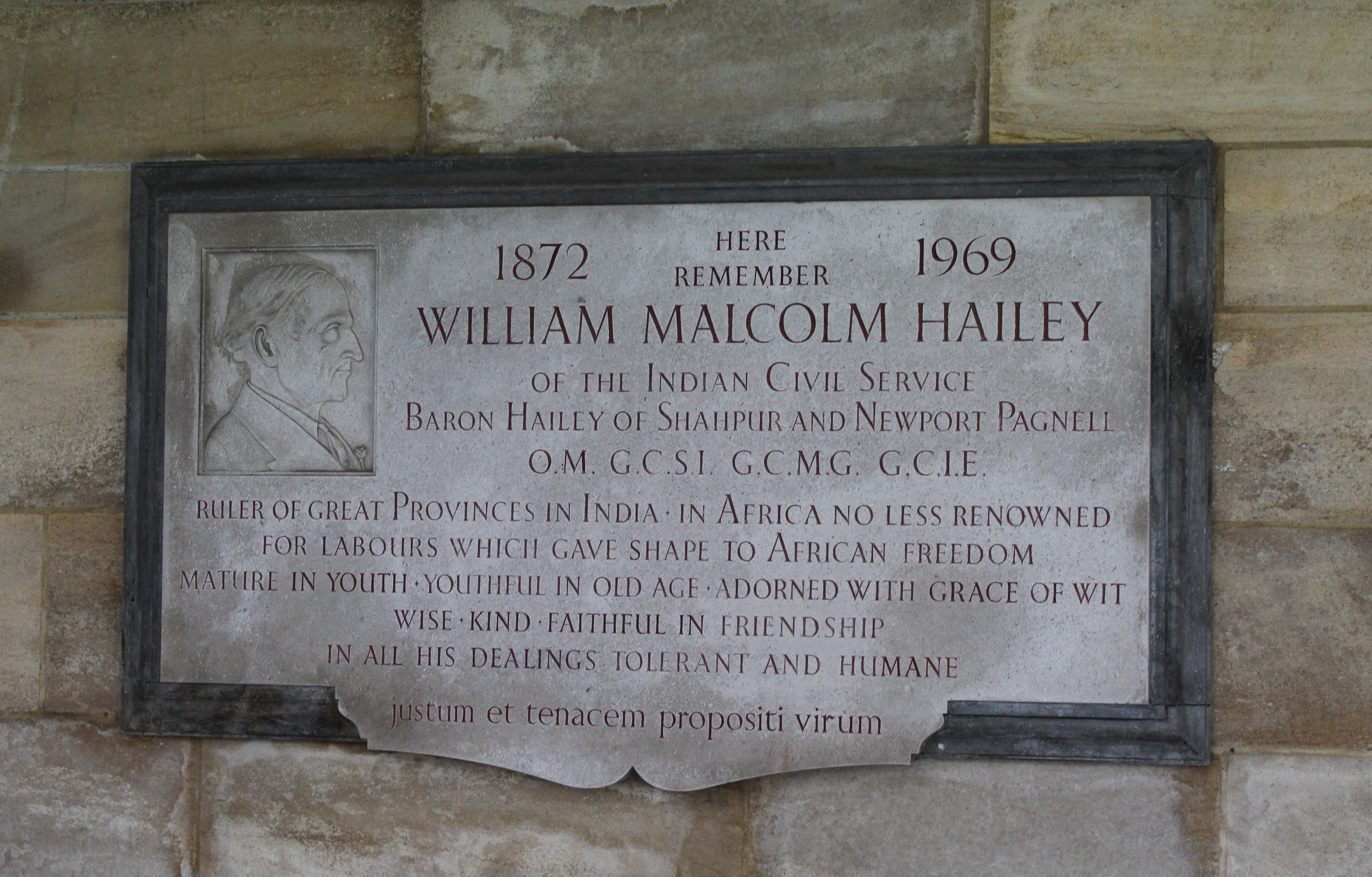
Hailey's memorial plaque in Westminster Abbey

Hailey married Andreina Alesandra Balzani in 1896.

Hailey died at Putney on 1 June 1969 and his ashes were taken for burial in the family vault at Simla in India. A memorial plaque to Hailey was unveiled in the west cloister of Westminster Abbey in 1971. With his death, the barony became extinct, as his only son and heir, Alan Hailey (1900–1943) had been killed without issue in the Middle East during the Second World War.

== Styles ==
- 1872–1911: Malcolm Hailey
- 1911–1915: Malcolm Hailey, CIE
- 1915–1921: Malcolm Hailey, CSI, CIE
- 1921–1928: Sir Malcolm Hailey, KCSI, CIE
- 1928–1932: Sir Malcolm Hailey, GCIE, KCSI
- 1932–1936: Sir Malcolm Hailey, GCSI, GCIE
- 1936–1939: The Right Honourable The Lord Hailey, GCSI, GCIE
- 1939–1948: The Right Honourable The Lord Hailey, GCSI, GCMG, GCIE
- 1948–1956: The Right Honourable The Lord Hailey, GCSI, GCMG, GCIE, PC
- 1956–1969: The Right Honourable The Lord Hailey, OM, GCSI, GCMG, GCIE, PC

== Sources ==
=== Books ===
- Concise Dictionary of National Biography
- Cell, John W. (1992). Hailey: A Study in British Imperialism, 1872-1969. Cambridge University Press. ISBN 0-521-41107-6.

=== Newspapers ===
- Newspaper clippings about Malcolm Hailey, 1st Baron Hailey in the 20th Century Press Archives of the ZBW

=== Websites ===
- 1942 speech
- Sir Malcolm Hailey, site hosted by National Informatics Centre, UP State Unit

Government offices
Preceded by Sir Alexander Phillips Muddiman	Governor of the United Provinces; 1928–1934	Succeeded by Sir Harry Graham Haig
Peerage of the United Kingdom
New creation	Baron Hailey; 1936–1969	Extinct
