= Eastern Committee =

The Eastern Committee (EC) was an interdepartmental committee of the War Cabinet of the British Government, created towards the end of World War I. Its function was to formulate a coherent Middle East policy, resolving conflicting visions of involved departments. Its creation was approved by the War Cabinet on 11 March 1918 and it held its first of 49 meetings on 28 March 1918.

It discussed the strategy Great Britain would follow at the planned after-war peace conference and the goals to achieve in the East, in order to protect its imperial interests.

While the formation of a new department in place of the Committee was blocked, it failed to bridge the conflicting interests of the competing ministers and departments. It remained in function until January 1919.

== History ==
In March 1917, the War Cabinet had set up the Mesopotamian Administration Committee. Besides Lord Curzon as chairman and Mark Sykes as secretary, members included Lord Alfred Milner, Charles Hardinge, Sir Arthur Hirtzel, Sir Thomas Holderness, Sir Ronald Graham and Sir George Clerk. Sir Henry McMahon also became a member.

In July, its powers having been expanded to cover Middle Eastern matters, its name was changed to the Middle East Committee. Edwin Montagu, Arthur Balfour and Robert Cecil also joined the new Committee.

After failed attempts to create a separate overarching Middle East Department, the Cabinet merged the Middle East Committee with the Foreign Office Russia Committee and the interdepartmental Persia Committee, to become the Eastern Committee.

== Members ==
The full members were:

- Lord Curzon, Leader of the House of Lords (Chairman)
- Arthur Balfour, Foreign Secretary (or his deputy)
- Edwin Samuel Montagu, Secretary of State for India
- Sir Henry Wilson, Chief of the Imperial General Staff
- Jan Smuts, Minister without Portfolio in the War Cabinet
- Captain E. Abraham, War Cabinet Secretary

Lancelot Oliphant (Persia) and Mark Sykes (Middle East) from the Foreign Office were to act as liaison officials with the Secretary and attend when their area was under discussion. (Russia would be handled on an ad-hoc basis).

== Activities ==
The Committee held its first of 49 meetings on 28 March 1918. The EC discussed information provided by the Foreign Office's Political Intelligence Department. The Imperial War Cabinet decided on disputes.

In July 1918, Montagu vainly sent the Cabinet a note, in which he suggested to turn it into a Cabinet Committee of ministers only, to discuss questions of policy of Middle East affairs. A sub-committee might assist the Committee.

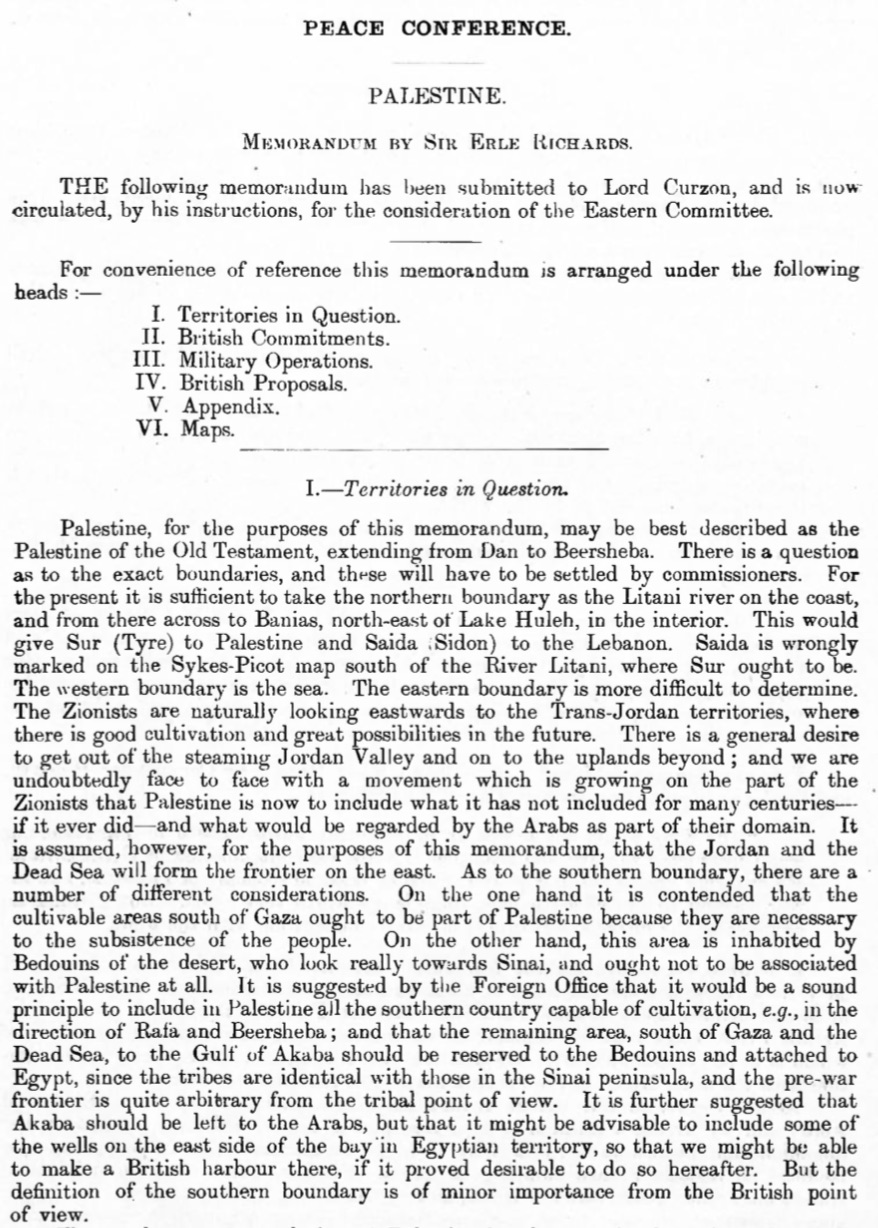
Henry Erle Richards' memo on Palestine

On 21 October 1918, the War Cabinet asked Smuts to prepare a negotiation brief for use by the 1919 Paris Peace Conference delegates. Smuts asked Henry Erle Richards to carry out this task.

The Eastern Committee met nine times in November and December to draft a set of resolutions on British policy. In November, T. E. Lawrence presented to the EC a map with proposals for a modification of the Sykes–Picot Agreement, which would redraw the borders in the Middle East.

The resolutions of the EC and other materials were distilled by Henry Erle Richards into secret "P-memos". Three of them concerned respectively Syria, Palestine and Arabia.

== Dissolution ==
Having prepared British desiderata for the Paris Peace Conference, the Committee asked the Cabinet on 7 January 1919 to be dissolved. It recommended its tasks to be carried on by ad-hoc "Interdepartmental conferences". On 10 January, the War Cabinet approved the proposal.

For two years thereafter, the Eastern Committee was in turn replaced by the ad-hoc Interdepartmental Conference on Middle Eastern Affairs, Lord Curzon of Kedleston (Lord President of the Council) still in the chair while deputizing for Secretary of State for Foreign Affairs Arthur Balfour in his absence at the Peace Conference.

== See also ==
- McMahon–Hussein Correspondence
