= Hilda Matheson =

English radio producer (1888–1940)

- Born: 7 June 1888; London, England
- Died: 30 October 1940 (aged 52); Horsell, England
- Occupation: radio administrator
- Years active: 1926–1940
- Known for: First Director of Talks at the BBC
- Notable work: The African Survey

Hilda Matheson, OBE (7 June 1888 – 30 October 1940) was a pioneering English radio talks producer at the BBC and its first Director of Talks. After resigning from the BBC in 1931, she published a book on the development of broadcasting. Though officially the secretary, Matheson served as an executive manager for the African Survey after Malcolm Hailey fell ill. During the Second World War, she ran the British Joint Broadcasting Committee until her death.

== Early life ==
Hilda Matheson was born on 7 June 1888 in Putney, south-west London, to Scottish parents, Margaret (née Orr) and Donald Matheson. She was the elder sister of D M Matheson. She was a boarding student at Saint Felix School in Southwold for four years. Matheson wanted to continue studying history at Cambridge, but left school at 18, when her father's health forced the family to move to Europe. Life in France, Germany and Italy gained her fluency in all three languages. The family returned to England in 1908, when her father became Presbyterian chaplain for Oxford University undergraduates. Matheson enrolled as a history student in the Society of Oxford Home Students. After completing school in 1911, she worked as a part-time secretary for H. A. L. Fisher at New College, Oxford and later for David George Hogarth, the keeper of the Ashmolean Museum.

During the First World War, Matheson worked as an MI5 operative in army intelligence. She ended her war work in Rome, at the British military control office, then briefly worked for Philip Kerr (later Lord Lothian), who introduced her to Britain's first female parliamentarian, Lady Nancy Astor. Astor, having previously turned Matheson down, appointed her as her political secretary in 1919, which gained her a wide circle of political, intellectual and social acquaintances. While there in 1926, Matheson met John Reith, head of the fledgling BBC, who recruited her.

== BBC and estrangement ==
Initially, Matheson was hired to assist J. C. Stobart, who was the head of the Education Department of the BBC. At that time, BBC Radio's role was one of news provider and instead of writing its own copy, its news bulletins were supplied by Reuters. The agreement with newspaper owners banning the BBC from editing bulletins and reading only prepared copy after 6 pm would not be lifted until 1928. Matheson became the first Director of Talks in 1927 and established the first news section, when the organisation became incorporated. An unlikely candidate for the post, as a woman and a left-leaning liberal, Matheson supported the League of Nations, sympathised with socialism and supported women's rights, in addition to being a lesbian. About the same time as she began working for the BBC, Matheson began an affair with Vita Sackville-West.

In 1928, when the ban on broadcasting its own news was overturned, the BBC began reporting rather than simply reading bulletins. Matheson developed standards for factual reporting of social commentary, current affairs, politics and news. She recognised that neither lectures, speeches nor theatre were appropriate means of communication for the new medium of radio and developed models to create a more personal experience for the listener. She sought to make presentations which were informal and conversational, rather than formal and oratorical. To counter Reith's suspicion that Britain's cultural elite would reject Matheson's Americanised approach, she invited Britain's intellectuals, including E. M. Forster, John Maynard Keynes, George Bernard Shaw, H. G. Wells, Rebecca West, Vita Sackville-West and Virginia Woolf to give presentations. In addition to her drive to give listeners critical analysis of literary and cultural works, Matheson began a Week in Westminster programme to provide education by female MPs about the workings of Parliament to newly enfranchised women. She also organised the first live broadcast of a political debate by the three leaders of the main British political parties.

By 1930, Matheson and Reith were increasingly estranged. As the political climate of the time brought fear and protectionism, Reith began to take issue with Matheson's left-leaning views. Their dispute came to a head when Reith, who despised modern literature, refused to allow Harold Nicolson, Sackville-West's husband, to analyse Lady Chatterley’s Lover and Ulysses on air. Nicolson, who was aligned with the Labour Party and had supported the Welsh miners in the aftermath of the General Strike, was an irritant to many of the BBC's right-leaning listeners. Reith imposed censorship on programming, which Matheson refused to accept, and she tendered her resignation in 1931.

== Middle career ==
In January, 1932, Matheson left the BBC and began working as the radio critic at The Observer, which was owned at the time by the Astor family. About the same time, she ended her relationship with Sackville-West and began a long-term one with the poet Dorothy Wellesley, Duchess of Wellington, moving to Penns in the Rocks, a farm on the Wellesley estate in Withyham, East Sussex. In 1933, H. A. L. Fisher commissioned Matheson to write a book she called Broadcasting, which captured the innovative technology of radio and the march of technology, and was still being cited in the 1990s. She also wrote a weekly column for the Week-end Review. Shortly after her book was published, Matheson was hired as secretary to Malcolm Hailey for The African Survey. Lord Lothian, who at the time was at the Royal Institute of International Affairs and Joseph Oldham, secretary of the International Missionary Council, convinced the Carnegie Trust to finance research into British colonial policy in Africa and into the extent to which indigenous Africans should be involved in policy-making.

Though Hailey agreed to the project in May 1933, he could not begin before completing a prior commitment. Initially, he thought he would start in September 1934, but he actually did so almost a year later. Meanwhile Matheson went ahead and served more as executive manager to the endeavour than as his secretary, canvassing scientists and administrators to help with logistics and plan the scope of the project, while completing coordination of all the preparatory research. Of the planned 22 chapters, many were from anthropologists and other specialists, as by 1936 Hailey's health was failing and his correspondence with Matheson showed he did not feel he could complete the task. Hailey's health broke down completely in 1937. While he was in hospital, Frederick Pedler stepped in to edit and revise the galley proofs. The report, containing nearly 2000 pages of data, appeared in November 1938. Matheson was awarded in the following year an Officer of the Most Excellent Order of the British Empire (OBE) for her effort in concluding the project.

== Later career and death ==
After finishing the survey, Matheson and Wellesley took a trip to the Riviera, where they joined friends: W. B. Yeats and his wife George, and a newly met Walter J. Turner, the Australian poet. Returning to England in 1939, Matheson started as Director of the Joint Broadcasting Committee to counter German propaganda with pro-British themes. The goal was to broadcast British opinion on foreign stations in neutral European and Latin American countries, using German and Italian. The staff of 30 included Isa Benzie, Guy Burgess, Elspeth Huxley and Turner.

Matheson also initiated a publishing endeavour with Wellesley, which Turner called Britain in Pictures: 140 volumes were published after her death to counter publications glorifying Germany and present images of British notables, landscapes and cities. A few weeks before her death, Matheson contacted Astor about seeking an American publisher for the series.

She died on 30 October 1940 of Graves' disease, after thyroidectomy surgery performed at Kettlewell Hill Nursing Home in Horsell, Surrey. A biography by Michael Carney was self-published in 1999, and a revised edition by Carney with BBC producer Kate Murphy explores her life through the Astor papers and through her letters to Vita Sackville-West.
