= Audrey Richards =

British anthropologist (1899–1984)

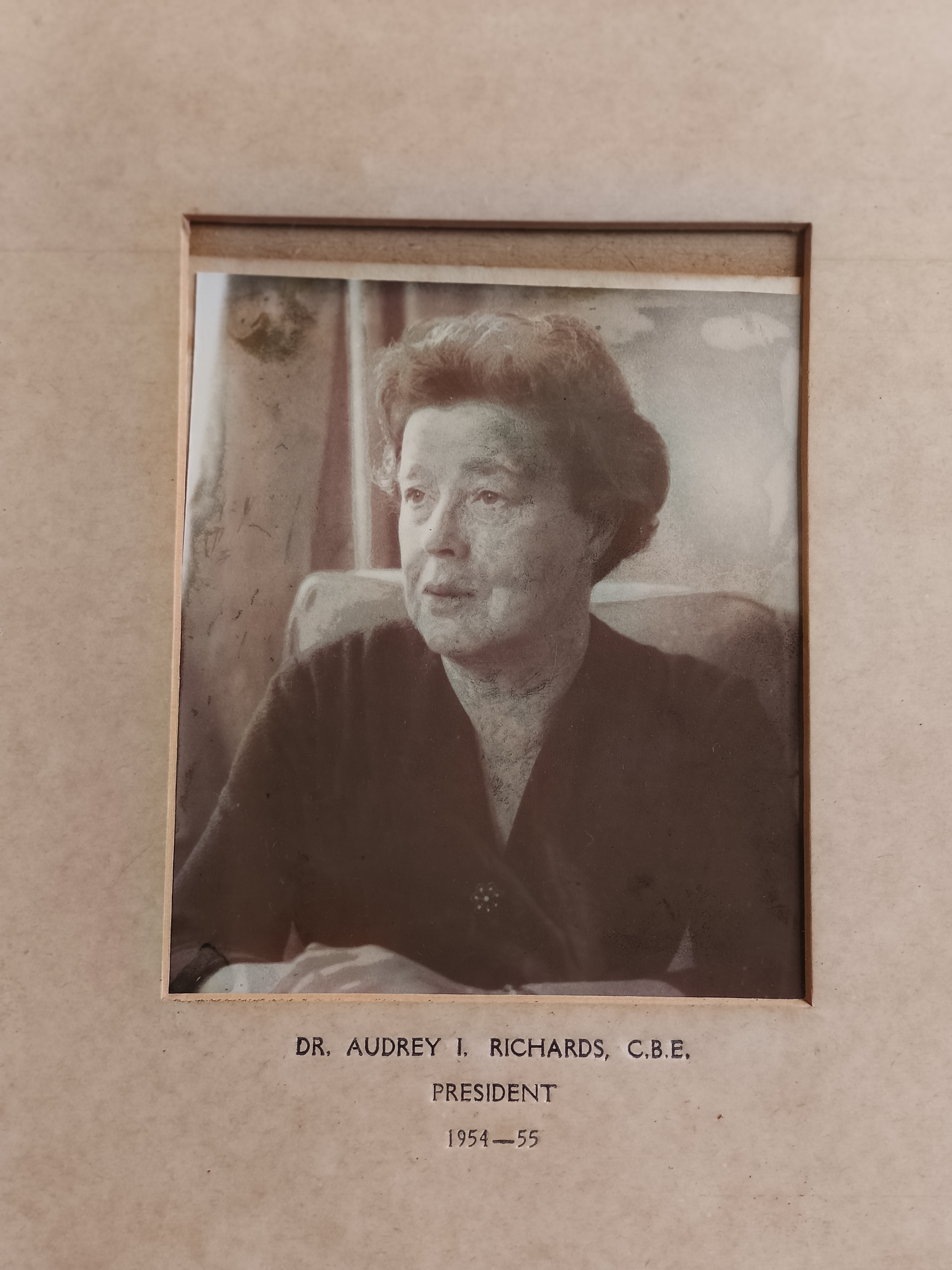
- Born: 8 July 1899; London, England
- Died: 29 June 1984 (aged 84); Midhurst, West Sussex, England
- Citizenship: British
- Education: Newnham College, Cambridge; London School of Economics
- Known for: Anthropology of Ritual, Anthropology of Nutrition, African Studies, Interdisciplinary Anthropology
- Scientific career
- Fields: Social anthropology
- Doctoral advisor: Bronisław Malinowski
- Doctoral students: Archie Mafeje

Audrey Isabel Richards, CBE, FRAI, FBA (8 July 1899 – 29 June 1984), was a pioneering British social anthropologist. She produced notable ethnographic studies, the most famous of which is Chisungu: A Girl's initiation ceremony among the Bemba of Zambia.

Her work also covered diverse topics such as nutrition, family structure, migration, and ethnicity. She conducted her field work in Zambia, Uganda and Essex.

== Early life and education ==
Audrey was the second of four girls born to a well-connected family in London, England. Her father, Sir Henry Erle Richards, was posted in Calcutta, India, where she spent her early childhood. Later, from 1911 to 1922, he was Chichele Professor of Public International Law at Oxford. Richards was educated at Downe House School and Newnham College, Cambridge, where she read natural sciences. She served as a relief worker in Germany for two years before returning to England and beginning graduate work.

She attended the London School of Economics where she was supervised by Bronisław Malinowski. She received her doctorate in 1931 for her thesis which was published in revised form as Hunger and work in a savage tribe: a functional study of nutrition among the Southern Bantu.

== Academic career ==
Though she was widely regarded for her academic accomplishments, Richards never held a chair in anthropology. She was a lecturer at the London School of Economics (1931–33) and (1935–37). She became senior lecturer in social anthropology at the University of Witwatersrand in South Africa in 1938.

However, she returned to Britain in 1940 in order to assist with the war effort and held various positions in the Colonial Office, participating in the formation of the Colonial Social Science Research Council (1944).

After the war, she held a position as Reader in Anthropology University of London from 1946 to 1950.

In 1950 she became the first director of the East African Institute of Social Research (Makerere College, Kampala, Uganda). She retired from this position in 1956.

In 1956, Richards returned to her alma mater Newnham College, Cambridge, where she had been elected a fellow. From 1956 to 1967, she was also director of the African Studies Centre at the University of Cambridge.

She was Smuts Reader in Anthropology at Cambridge between 1961 and 1967.

She served as the second President of the African Studies Association of the UK, and president of the Royal Anthropological Institute in 1964–65, and was the first woman to hold this position.

=== Research ===
She attended the London School of Economics where she was supervised by Bronislaw Malinowski. Richards went to Zambia (then Northern Rhodesia) in 1930 for her research for Hunger and work in a savage tribe: a functional study of nutrition among the Southern Bantu (1932). In this functional study she sets out to show how "the fundamental urge for food shapes human institutions" in some southern African societies.

She conducted fieldwork in 1930–31, 1933–34, and 1957, where she worked primarily among the Bemba. In her economic study of the Bemba tribe Land Labour, and diet in Northern Rhodesia (1939), she would revise her earlier analysis on food and institutions to reflect that her expanded fieldwork had given her "concrete material to show how the biological facts of appetite and diet are themselves shaped by ... system(s) of human relationships and traditional activities".

In her first publications on the Bemba people she emphasized the unintended consequences of planned social change and colonial rule on African people, showing the consequences of the introduction of a money economy, taxation and migration on these societies. In her own words, this would be a "new field of anthropological research -- African society as it is changing in contact with the forces of western civilization".

Audrey Richards' careful studies of daily life set a new standard for field research and opened a door for nutritional anthropology by concentrating on practical problems and working with an interdisciplinary focus. She is also regarded as a founder of the field of nutritional anthropology. She published Land, Labour and diet in Northern Rhodesia (1939) this was produced partly to support the nutritional interests of the International African Institute.

Another work she published for the East African Institute, "East African Chiefs" (1959), was designed to provide comparative date on the effects of Indirect Rule.

Later, Richards worked in the Transvaal region of South Africa in 1939-40 and in Uganda intermittently between 1950 and 1955.

She later carried out an ethnographic study of the village of Elmdon, Essex, England, where she lived for many years.

=== Chisingu: A girl's initiation ceremony among the Bemba of Zambia (1956) ===
This book is perhaps Richards' most well-known work. In this published monograph, Richards outlines that the Bemba society rests on three ritual complexes that are linked:

- Kingship Rituals
- Agricultural and Economic Rituals
- Chisingu Rituals

The Chisingu Rituals are initiation rituals of girls in the Bemba society, of which she presents a detailed account, analysis and interpretation.

These three ritual complexes are all linked in the Bemba belief and have an influence on the fertility of the land, and people.

Richards witnessed the Chisungu ritual during her first field work in 1931. It is a twenty-three day ceremony that involves songs, pottery and other symbolic elements. The express purpose of the Chisingu is the assumption of a new role: from young girl to womanhood. It can be classified as a "nubility ritual". Some rites concern removing the fear of blood, sex and fire from young girls. These rites have an element of trial, only those who are truly matured are able to pass them.

While many anthropologists claim the rites are a formal education for the child, Richards recounts the contrary, that no formal instruction is actually given. Instead, the girls learned secret terms known only to the initiated as well as socially approved attitudes toward their new duties as wives and mothers.

In place of the common interpretation of rites as education, Richards hypothesizes that the Chisingu is linked more with the social structure and values of the tribe.

She argues that rituals sustain cultural values of a society and are an intentional action rather than an expression of sentiment or emotion as in the explanation of ritual as a circular nature as advanced by Durkheim and Radcliffe-Brown. Richards offers multiple explanations that include the society, the groups within it and individuals.

In this work she also presents an interpretation of symbolic elements of ritual. She points out the need for multiple interpretations for ritual: remarking that ritual behavior is multivalent and multi-purpose (for example, it could be an occasion for group rivalry). She adds that these varied approaches will vary according to the expressed purposes and interpretations of the actors.

== Honors ==
Richards received the C.B.E. in 1955 and became a fellow of the British Academy in 1967. She was elected a Foreign Honorary Member of the American Academy of Arts and Sciences in 1974.

== Death ==
In later life, she lived in Highsett, Cambridge. She died in 1984 near Midhurst, West Sussex, England.

== Select publications ==
- Richards, Audrey. (1932) Hunger and work in a savage tribe: a functional study of nutrition among the Southern Bantu. London: Routledge & Kegan Paul.
- Richards, Audrey. (1939) Land, Labour, and Diet in Northern Rhodesia: and economic study of the Bemba tribe. Oxford: Oxford University Press.
- Richards, Audrey I. (1950) Some types of family structure amongst the Central Bantu
- Richards, Audrey. (1956) Chisungu: a girl's initiation ceremony among the Bemba of Northern Rhodesia. London: Faber.
- Richards, Audrey I. (1966) Changing structure of a Ganda village: Kisozi, 1892–1952, East Africon Studies No. 24 Nairobi: East African Publishing House
- Strathern, Marilyn and Audrey Richards. (1981) Kinship at the Core: An Anthropology of Elmdon, a Village in North-west Essex in the Nineteen-Sixties. Cambridge, UK: Cambridge University Press.
- Richards, Audrey I. (1969) The Multicultural States of East Africa. Montreal: McGill-Queen's University Press.
