= Colonial Development and Welfare Act 1959 =

Act of the Parliament of the United Kingdom

Colonial Development and Welfare Act 1959 (Note: Section 11.)
- Act of Parliament
- Parliament of the United Kingdom
- Long title: An Act to consolidate the Colonial Development and Welfare Acts, 1940 to 1959.
- Citation: 7 & 8 Eliz. 2. c. 71
- Territorial extent: United Kingdom

Dates
- Royal assent: 29 July 1959
- Commencement: 29 July 1959 (Note: The Acts of Parliament (Commencement) Act 1793.)
- Repealed: 27 May 1976
Other legislation
| Amends | See § Repealed enactments |
| Repeals/revokes | See § Repealed enactments |
| Amended by | Commonwealth Development Act 1963; National Loans Act 1968; Statute Law (Repeals) Act 1974 |
| Repealed by | Statute Law (Repeals) Act 1976 |

Status: Repealed

Text of statute as originally enacted

The Colonial Development and Welfare Act 1959 (7 & 8 Eliz. 2. c. 71) was an act of the Parliament of the United Kingdom that consolidated the Colonial Development and Welfare Acts, 1940 to 1959.

== Provisions ==
=== Repealed enactments ===
Section 10(1) of the act repealed 5 enactments, listed in the schedule to the act.

| Citation | Short title | Extent of repeal |
|---|---|---|
| 3 & 4 Geo. 6. c. 40 | Colonial Development and Welfare Act 1940 | The whole act. |
| 8 & 9 Geo. 6. c. 20 | Colonial Development and Welfare Act 1945 | The whole act. |
| 3 & 4 Eliz. 2. c. 6 | Colonial Development and Welfare Act 1955 | The whole act. |
| 5 & 6 Eliz. 2. c. 54 | Tanganyika Agricultural Corporation Act 1957 | In section one, subsection (2). |
| 7 & 8 Eliz. 2. c. 29 | Colonial Development and Welfare (Amendment) Act 1959 | The whole act. |

== Subsequent developments ==
Section 10(1) of, and the schedule to, the act were repealed by section 1 of, and part XI of the schedule to, the Statute Law (Repeals) Act 1974, which came into force on 27 June 1974.

The whole act was repealed by section 1(1) of, and part XIII of schedule 1 to, the Statute Law (Repeals) Act 1976, which came into force on 27 May 1976.
