= Chisungu =

1956 book by Audrey Richards

Chisungu: A Girl’s Initiation Ceremony among the Bemba of Zambia
- 1982 edition
- Author: Audrey Richards
- Language: English
- Subject: Anthropology, African studies, Bemba culture
- Genre: Ethnography
- Publisher: Faber and Faber
- Publication date: 1956
- Publication place: United Kingdom
- Media type: Print

Chisungu: A Girl’s Initiation Ceremony among the Bemba of Zambia (1956) is a book by Audrey Richards. It was reviewed in more than one scholarly journal, and is on reading lists for classes at the University of Cambridge and the University of Reading.
