= Highsett =

Coordinates: 52.196°N 0.131°E

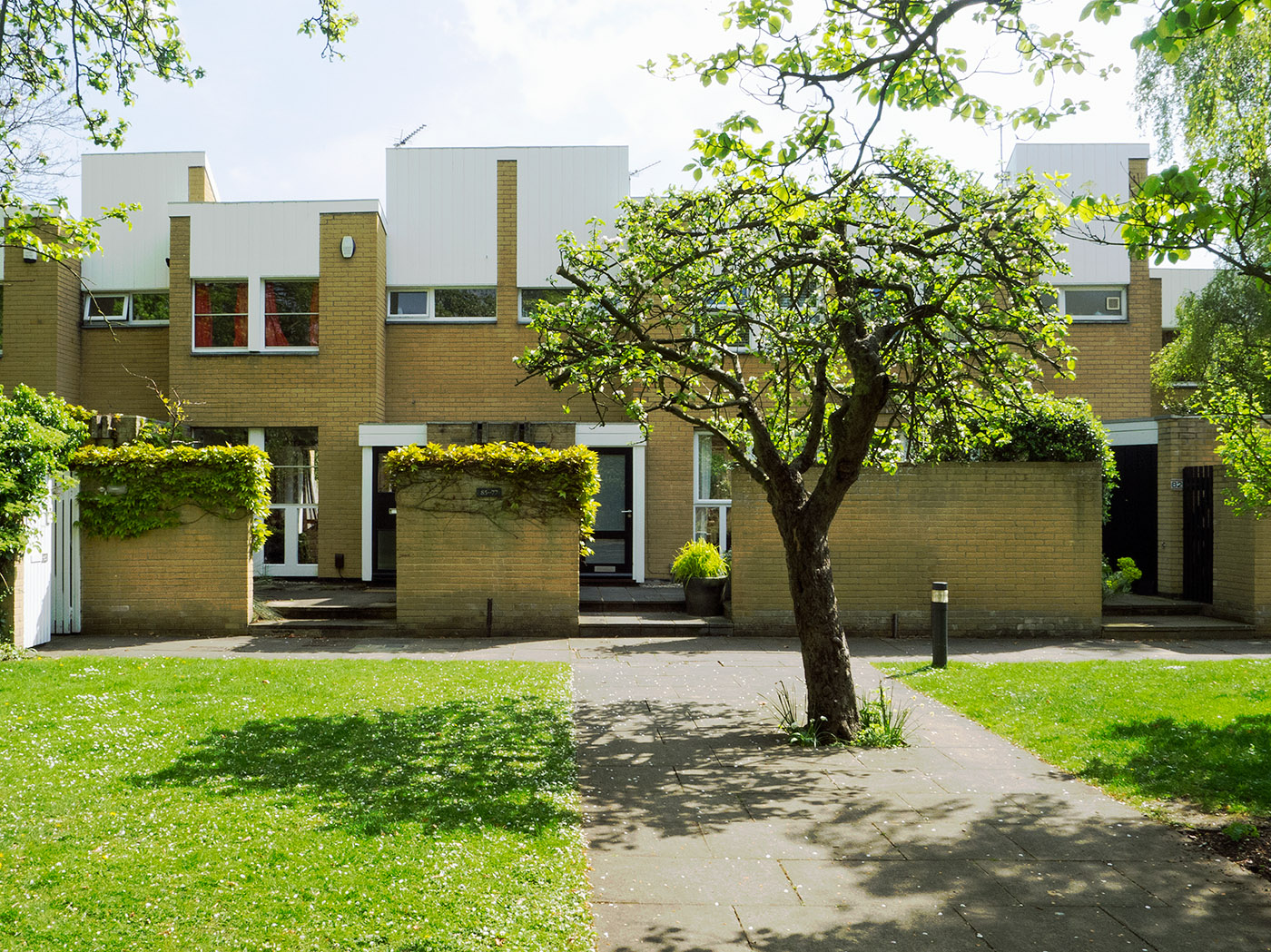
82–85 Highsett

Highsett is a residential estate and a listed heritage site in Cambridge, England.

The estate was designed by Eric Lyons (1912-1980) of Eric Lyons & Partners. It was built in three phases between 1959 and 1964. Phase I, named The Quadrant, comprises 31 flats and 6 duplexes; Phase II comprises 17 houses; and Phase III comprises 31 terrace houses.

Highsett won the RIBA Award 1966 (for Phase III). It became a Grade II listed building in 1998 under the name Highsett and front retaining wall.

== Notable residents ==
- Audrey Richards
