= Joseph Mary Nagle Jeffries =

Joseph Mary Nagle Jeffries, known as J. M. N. Jeffries (1880–1960), was a British war correspondent, historian and author. Between 1914 and 1933 he wrote for the Daily Mail, serving as a war correspondent as head of the Paris bureau during World War I. He is reported to have set a record by reporting World War I from at least 17 countries by 1918, including Egypt, Albania, Greece, Italy, Austria, Belgium and France. In 1922, he travelled with the owner of the Daily Mail, Viscount Northcliffe, to Mandatory Palestine.

== Bibliography ==
- Joseph Mary Nagle Jeffries (1939). Palestine: the reality. Hyperion Press. ISBN 978-0-88355-327-5.
- Joseph Mary Nagle Jeffries (1935). Front Everywhere. Hutchinson & Company, Limited.
- Jeffries, J. M. N. (1923). The Palestine deception. London: Daily Mail. LCCN 24012298. OL 6665095M.
- Joseph Mary Nagle Jeffries, London and Better (1936), Hutchinson & Co, London
