= James Barr (author) =

British historian (born 1976)

James Barr (born 1976) is a British author of a number of historical works on the Middle East. He is currently a visiting fellow at King's College London.

== Biography ==
Barr read modern history at Lincoln College, Oxford.

In 2006, Barr's history on Lawrence of Arabia and the British war effort in the Middle East was published by Bloomsbury. His second book, A Line in the Sand, on Anglo-French rivalry in the Middle East during the interwar period and World War II, appeared in 2011. Barr later gave a talk on A Line in the Sand at the 2023 Caterham History Festival at Caterham School.

He has worked for the Daily Telegraph, and in Westminster and in London.

In October and November 2023, Barr delivered the 'A Complicated History' miniseries in conversation with Evan Davis on BBC Radio 4's PM programme on the history of the Israel Palestine conflict.

== Publications ==
- Setting the Desert on Fire: T. E. Lawrence and Britain's Secret War in Arabia, 1916-1918 (2006)
- A Line in the Sand: Britain, France and the Struggle that Shaped the Middle East (2011). Paperback (2012), ISBN 978-1847394576
- Lords of the Desert: Britain's Struggle with America to Dominate the Middle East (2018).

== Links ==
- Author's site
