= Henry Erle Richards =

British academic (1861–1922)

Sir Henry Erle Richards, KCSI, KC (1861–1922), also Erle Richards or H. Erle Richards, was the Chichele Professor of International Law and Diplomacy at Oxford University, the Legal Member of Council in British India. He was a fellow of All Souls College, Oxford.

Anthropologist Audrey Richards was his daughter.

== Early life and education ==
The eldest son of the Prebendary Richards, he was schooled at Eton College, and studied at New College, Oxford.

His great-grandfather was Richard Richards, Chief Baron of the Exchequer, and his great uncle was William Erle, Chief Justice of the Common Pleas. In 1897 he married the eldest daughter of the late Spencer Perceval Butler, and was a brother-in-law of Sir Harcourt Butler, the Governor of the United Provinces of India.

== Career ==
Richards was called to the Bar at Inner Temple in 1887. He joined the Oxford Circuit, and worked with Robert Finlay on Government work. In late 1902, Finlay appointed him counsel to the Post office on the Oxford circuit. As junior counsel he represented Great Britain at the Permanent Court of Arbitration in the Samoan and Venezuelan arbitrations.

In 1904 he was appointed Legal Member of the Governor-General's Council in British India, serving for five years. During this time he revised the Code of Criminal Procedure.

He became a KC in 1905, and on returning to England in 1909 was appointed counsel to the India Office, practising before the Judicial Committee of the Privy Council. During this time he represented Newfoundland and Canada in the North Atlantic Coast Fisheries Arbitration at the Permanent Court of Arbitration.

He was appointed Chichele Professor of International Law and Diplomacy at Oxford in 1911, until 1922, taking over from Thomas Erskine Holland.
