= Colonial Development and Welfare Acts =

Acts of the Parliament of the United Kingdom

The Colonial Development and Welfare Acts were a series of acts implemented by the British Parliament.

== Colonial Development Act 1929 ==
Colonial Development Act 1929 (Note: Section 5.)
- Act of Parliament
- Parliament of the United Kingdom
- Long title: An Act to authorise the making of advances for aiding and developing agriculture and industry in certain colonies and territories, to provide for the extension of the Colonial Stock Acts, 1877 to 1900, to stock forming part of the public debt of certain protected and mandated territories, and to amend the Palestine and East Africa Loans Act, 1926, and section eleven of the Trusts (Scotland) Act, 1921.
- Citation: 20 Geo. 5. c. 5
- Territorial extent: United Kingdom

Dates
- Royal assent: 26 July 1929
- Commencement: 26 July 1929 (Note: The Acts of Parliament (Commencement) Act 1793.)
- Repealed: 19 November 1998
Other legislation
Amends	Trusts (Scotland) Act 1921; Palestine and East Africa Loans Act 1926
Repealed by	Statute Law (Repeals) Act 1998

Status: Repealed

Text of statute as originally enacted

Revised text of statute as amended

Following the First World War, a group of European settlers emerged in Kenya, known as the Happy Valley set. Under the political guidance of Lord Delamere they sought to ensure that colonial policy suited the interests of these White settlers. However, with a certain amount of migration from the sub-continent of India, then under the British Raj, the racial exclusivity of the prime areas for settling came into dispute, and in 1923 Victor Cavendish, 9th Duke of Devonshire issued the Devonshire Declaration.

== Colonial Development and Welfare Act 1940 ==
Colonial Development and Welfare Act 1940 (Note: Section 4.)
- Act of Parliament
- Parliament of the United Kingdom
- Long title: An Act to make provision for promoting the development of the resources of colonies, protectorates, protected states and mandated territories and the welfare of their peoples, and for relieving colonial and other Governments from liability in respect of certain loans.
- Citation: 3 & 4 Geo. 6. c. 40
- Territorial extent: United Kingdom

Dates
- Royal assent: 17 July 1940
- Commencement: 17 July 1940
- Repealed: 29 July 1959
Other legislation
Amended by	Colonial Development and Welfare Act 1945; Statute Law Revision Act 1953
Repealed by	Colonial Development and Welfare Act 1959

Status: Repealed

Text of statute as originally enacted

In 1942 the provisions of the Colonial Development and Welfare Act 1940 (3 & 4 Geo. 6. c. 40) were used initially to fund the British Colonial Research Committee. Later the Colonial Social Science Research Council which was set up in 1944. The act provided for £5 million per year for development and £500,000 per year for research.

== Colonial Development and Welfare Act 1945 ==
Colonial Development and Welfare Act 1945 (Note: Section 3(1).)
- Act of Parliament
- Parliament of the United Kingdom
- Long title: An Act to increase the amounts payable out of moneys provided by Parliament for the purposes of schemes under section one of the Colonial Development and Welfare Act, 1940, to extend the period during which certain of such schemes may continue in force, and to amend subsection (2) of the said section as respects the Aden Protectorate.
- Citation: 8 & 9 Geo. 6. c. 20
- Territorial extent: United Kingdom

Dates
- Royal assent: 25 April 1945
- Commencement: 25 April 1945
- Repealed: 29 July 1959
Other legislation
Amends	Colonial Development and Welfare Act 1940
Repealed by	Colonial Development and Welfare Act 1959

Status: Repealed

Text of statute as originally enacted

The Colonial Development and Welfare Act 1945 (8 & 9 Geo. 6. c. 20) provided a significant extension of the 1940 act. The financing made available was increased to £120 million for all purposes to be spent between 1946 and 1956.
