= Colonial Social Science Research Council =

The Colonial Social Science Research Council (CSSRC) was an expert panel established in the United Kingdom in 1944 under the Colonial Development and Welfare Act 1940 in order to advise the Secretary of State for the Colonies on the award of research funding in sociology and anthropology relating to colonial development. In 1949 it was chaired by Alexander Carr-Saunders and its members consisted of Frank Debenham, Raymond Firth, Harry Hodson, Margery Perham, Arnold Plant, Margaret Helen Read, Godfrey Thomson, and Ralph Lilley Turner.
