= Bunsen =

Bunsen may refer to:

- Christian Charles Josias Bunsen (1791–1860), Prussian diplomat and scholar
- Frances Bunsen (1791–1876), or Baroness Bunsen, Welsh painter and author, wife of Christian
- Robert Bunsen (1811–1899), German chemist, after whom is named:
  - Bunsen burner
  - Bunsen cell
  - Bunsen crater on the Moon
  - 10361 Bunsen, an asteroid
  - Bunsen Reaction
  - The Bunsen–Kirchhoff Award, a German award for spectroscopy
- Maurice de Bunsen (1852–1932), British diplomat
- Dr. Bunsen Honeydew, fictional character from the Muppet Show
