= Hendrik Voogd =

Dutch painter and printmaker

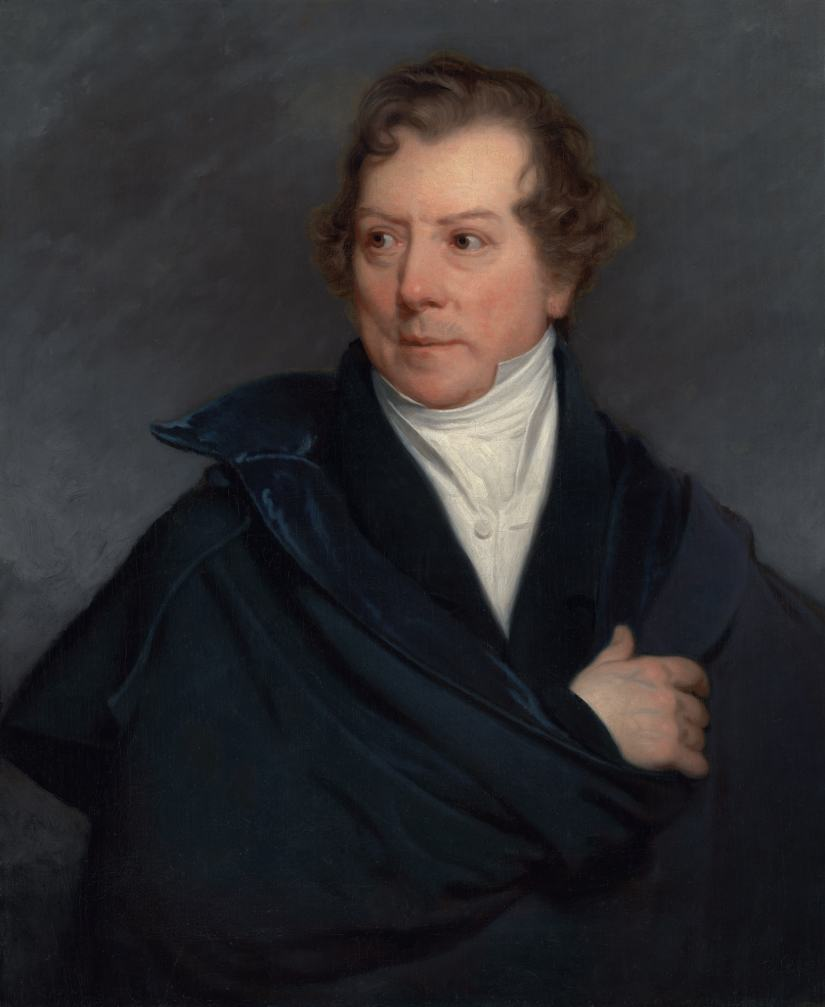
- Portrait by Charles Howard Hodges (1764-1837), 1828
- Born: 10 July 1768; Amsterdam, Dutch Republic
- Died: 4 September 1839 (aged 71); Rome, Papal States

Hendrik Voogd (Dutch pronunciation: [ˈɦɛndrɪk ˈfoːxt]; (Note: Voogd in isolation: [voːxt].) 10 July 1768 – 4 September 1839) was a Dutch painter and printmaker, who was active in Italy.

== Life ==
Hendrik Voogd was born on 10 July 1768 in Amsterdam in the Dutch Republic.

Beginning in 1783, Voogd studied at a local Academy and then later apprenticed under the wallpaper painter Jurriaan Andriessen. The financial aid of the Amsterdam art collector D. Versteegh (1751–1822) enabled him to depart in 1788 for Rome to obtain further training in landscape painting.

While in Italy, Voogd befriended many famous landscape painters, such as Nicolas-Didier Boguet, Johann Christian Reinhart and Johann Martin von Rohden. Little is known about his life. He remained in Italy apart from a short visit to the Netherlands in 1828. He never married and is not known to have had any children. Voogd died on 4 September 1839 in Rome in the Papal States. From his obituary, it seems he was considered to be an old-fashioned artist of little influence. The discovery in 1959 of about two hundred of his drawings in Duivenvoorde Castle in South Holland revived interest in his work.

== Work ==
It is apparent, from one of his infrequent letters home, that Voogd made numerous drawings of Rome and its surroundings, including Tivoli, Lazio, Lake Albano, Castel Gandolfo, and Lake Nemi. Some of these drawings, executed mostly in pencil and black chalk, consist of motifs taken directly from nature, such as trees and rocks; others portray views.

Voogd's works from his first Roman years are primarily drawings with colored wash in the typical late 18th-century linear style. One of his major influences was Claude Lorrain. Due to the similarities in style he was nicknamed the 'Dutch Claude Lorrain'. However, in spite of these influences Voogd still retained influences from his Dutch heritage. He experimented with unusual lighting effects and luxuriant foliage, and from 1806 onwards cattle began to feature prominently in his drawings and paintings. Some of his works can be found at the Rijksmuseum.

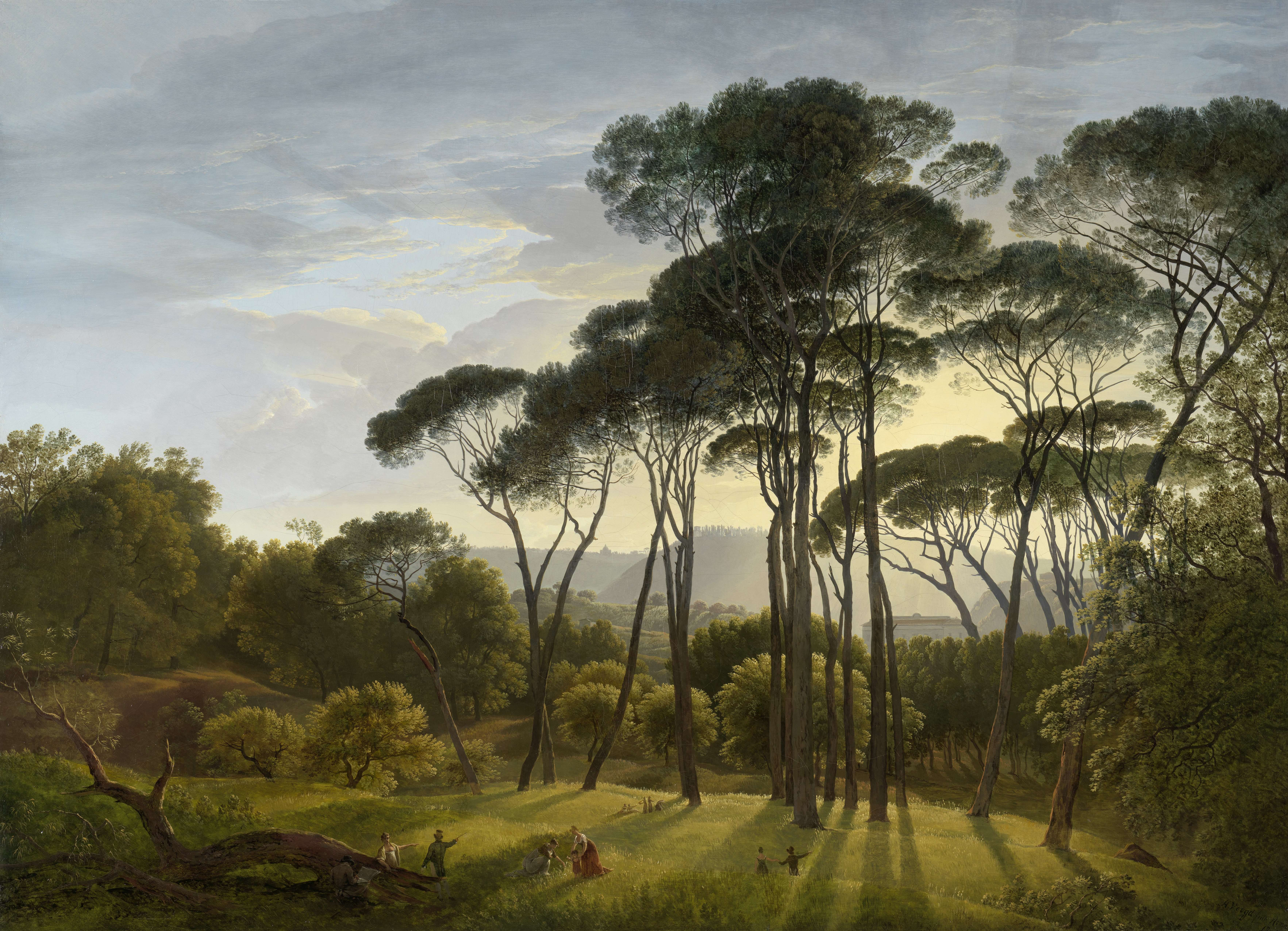
Italian Landscape with Umbrella Pines, 1807. Rijksmuseum

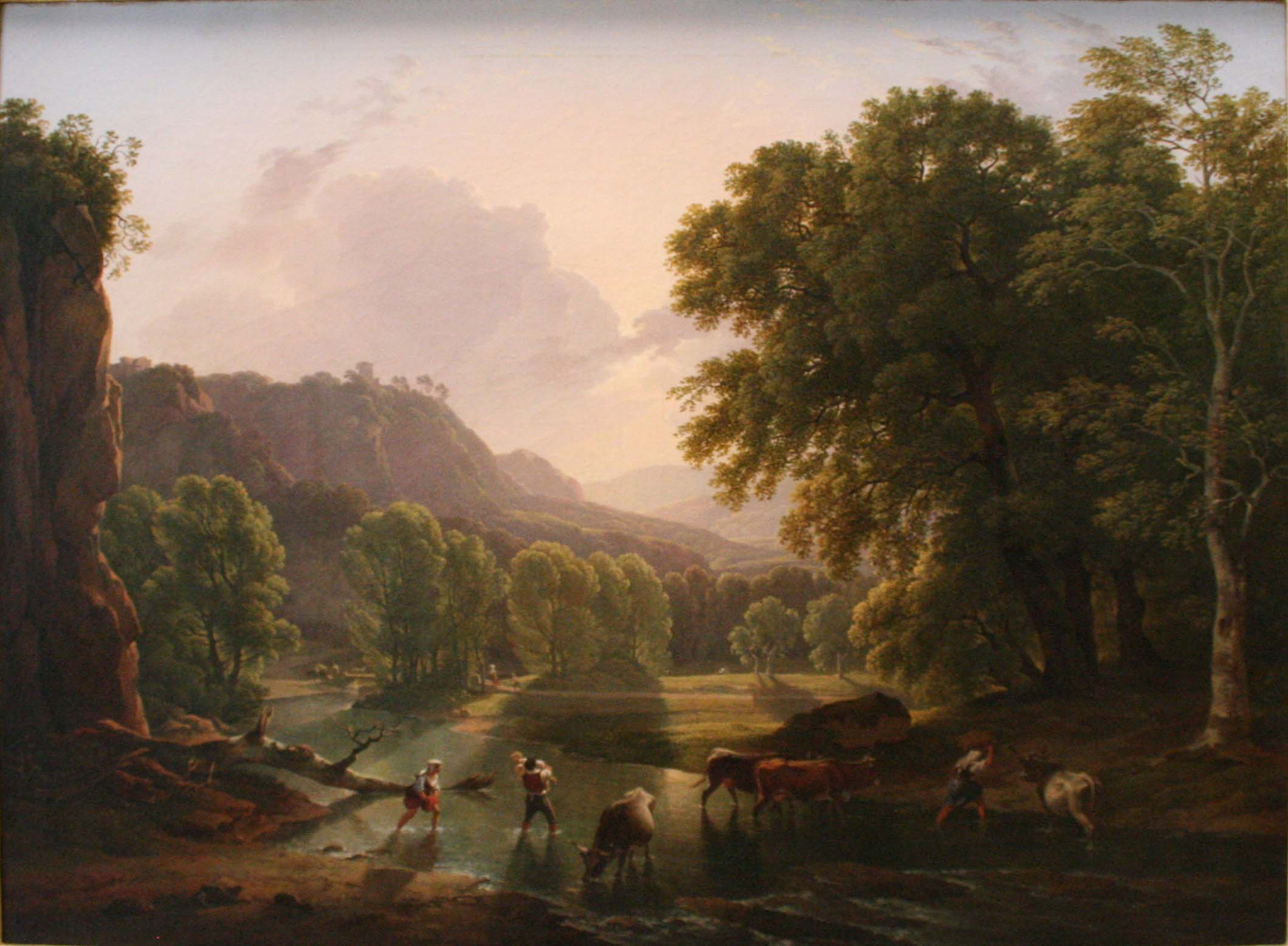
Passage at the ford, 1819. Musée Fabre

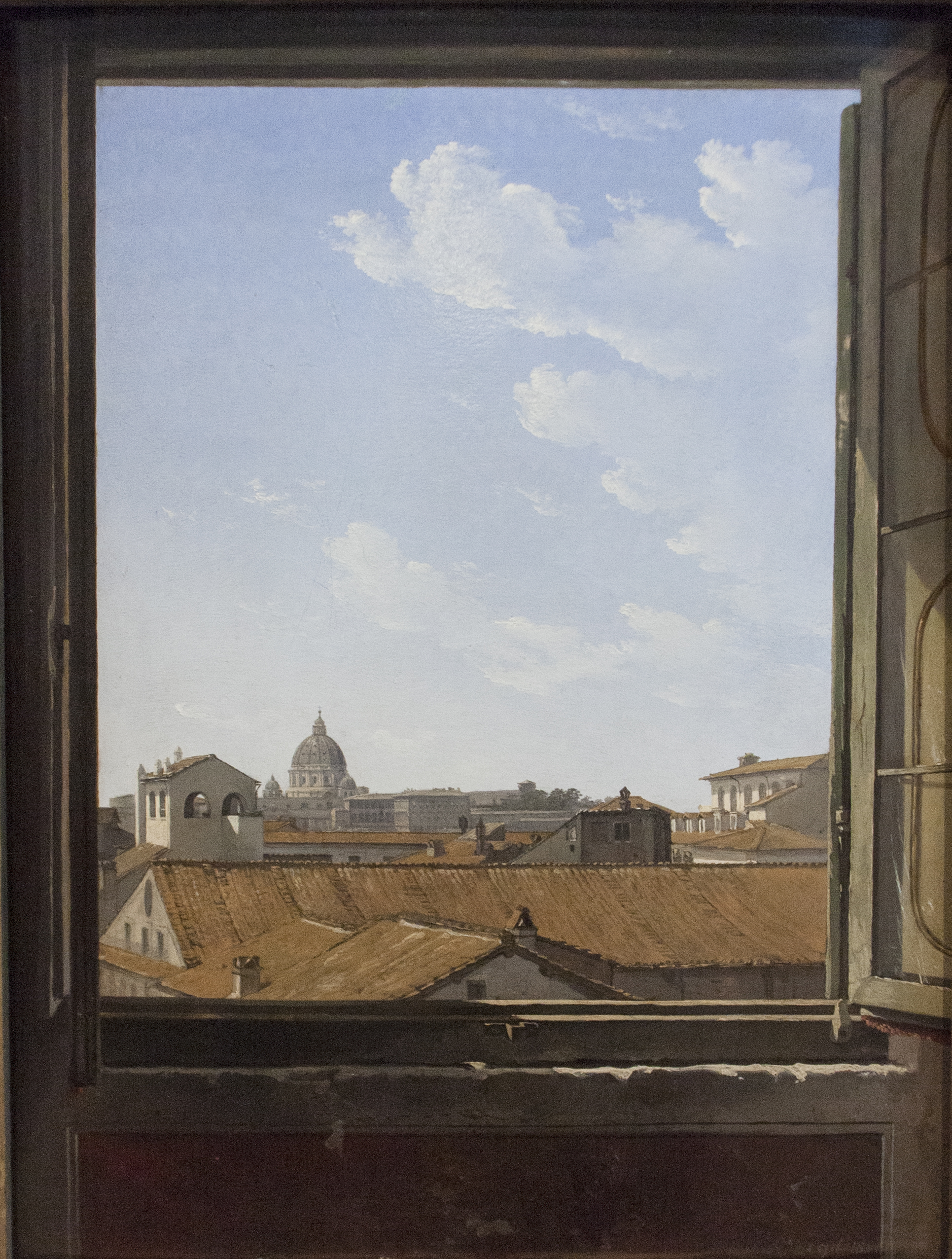
View of Rome from the Window, 1809

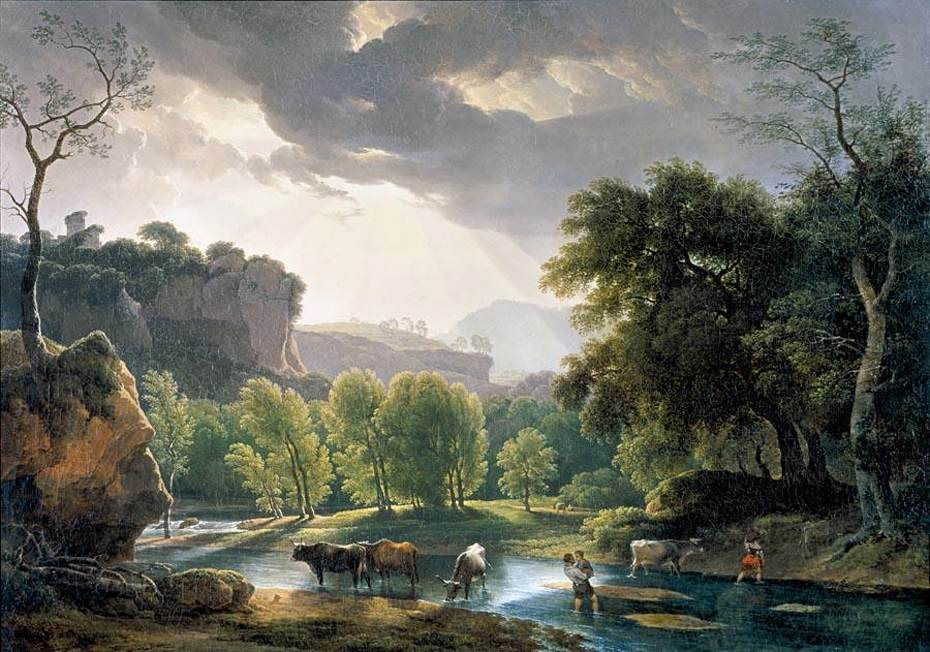
View of the Roman Campagna, 1814. Private collection

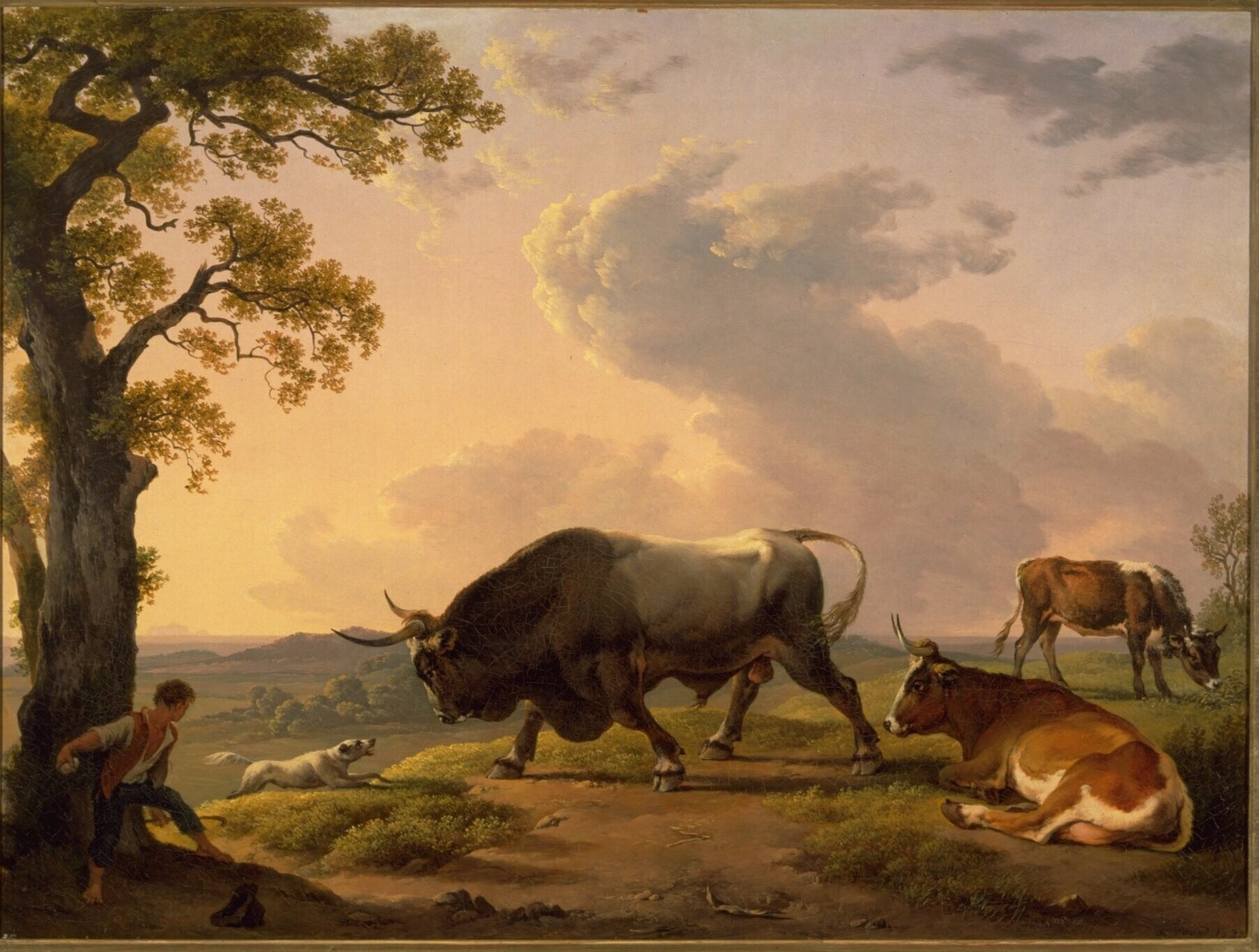
A Bull Attacked by a Dog in an Italian Landscape, 1832. Museum Boijmans Van Beuningen
