= Bundsen =

Bundsen is a surname. Notable people with the surname include:

- Jes Bundsen (1766–1829), Danish artist
- Johanna Bundsen (born 1991), Swedish handball player
- Victoria Bundsen (1839–1909), Swedish opera singer

== See also ==
- Bunsen
