= Ernst Zacharias Platner =

German painter and writer

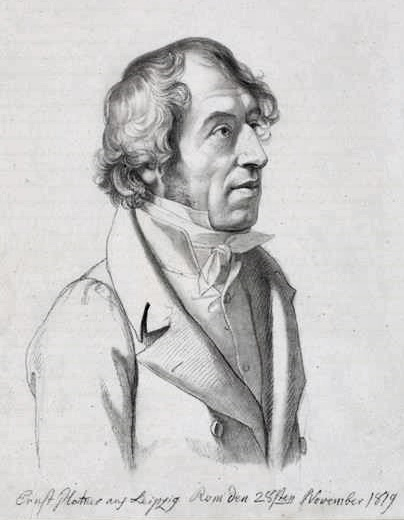
Ernst Zacharias Platner; by Carl Christian Vogel von Vogelstein (1829)

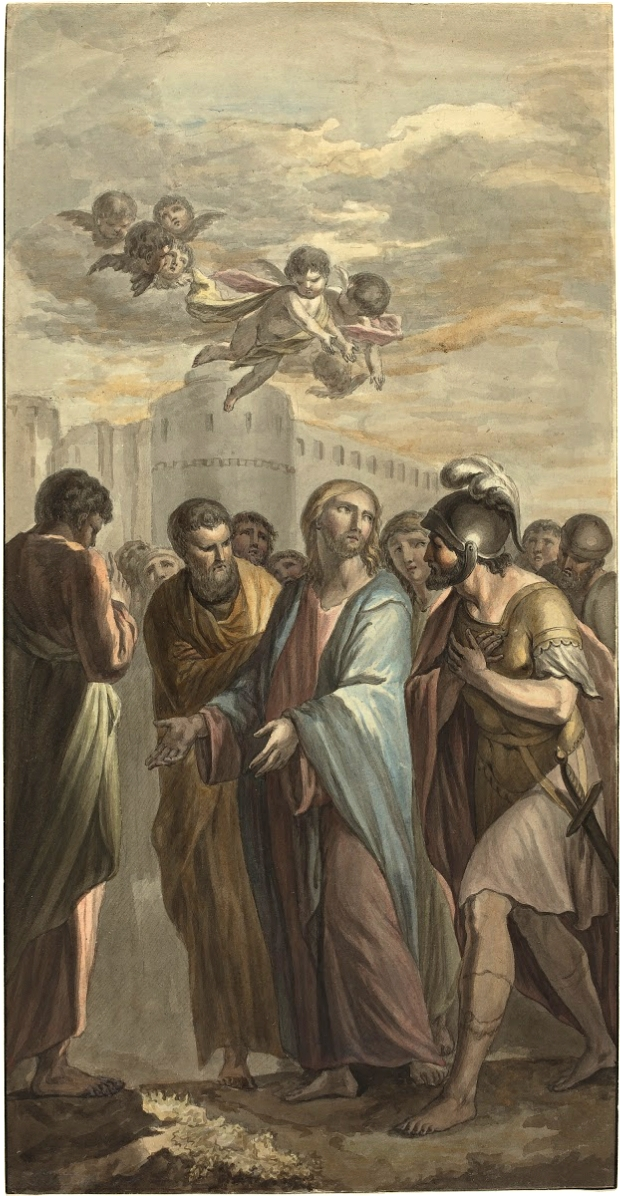
Christ with His Apostles and a Roman Soldier

Ernst Zacharias Platner (1 October 1773, Leipzig – 14 October 1855, Rome) was a German painter, writer, and diplomat.

== Biography ==
His father was the physician, Ernst Platner. He began studying art in Leipzig, with Adam Friedrich Oeser, then went to Dresden, followed by Vienna, where he studied with Heinrich Friedrich Füger. In 1800, he moved to Rome, and settled there permanently. His first works were not very successful, so he devoted some of his time to studying Italian history.

In the winter of 1817/1818, the publisher Johann Friedrich Cotta paid a visit to Rome. On the recommendation of the Prussian ambassador, Barthold Georg Niebuhr, he gave Platner a commission to rework a book about Italy, by Johann Jacob Volkmann. Together with Christian Karl Josias von Bunsen, and several other specialists, he produced what is now a standard work, Description of the City of Rome, in two volumes. He also published a biography of the painter, Gottlieb Schick, which was reprinted in 2010.

From 1823 until his death, he held the office of Chargé d'Affaires for the Kingdom of Saxony, at the Holy See. When Pope Pius IX had to flee Rome in 1849, following the establishment of the short-lived Roman Republic, revolutionaries came to Platner's home and tore down the Papal flag. Platner immediately took down the Saxon flag, declaring: "His Majesty the King accredited me to His Holiness, but not to you!”.

The Academy of Fine Arts, Munich, and the Dresden Academy of Fine Arts, both named him an honorary member. In 1838, he was presented with an honorary doctorate by the University of Leipzig. He was interred at the Teutonic Cemetery.

His only son, Ferdinand (1824–1896), was also a painter. Gertrud, one of his five daughters, married the painter, Alexander Maximilian Seitz. Their son, Ludovico, later became Director of the Pinacoteca Vaticana.
