= Kaspar Schleibner =

German church painter

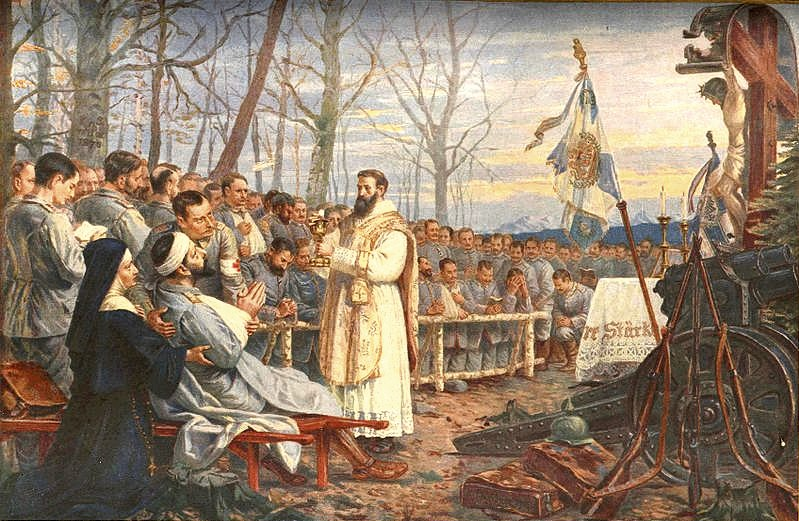
Bavarian Field Mass (postcard)

Kaspar Schleibner (23 February 1863 – 27 January 1931) was a German church painter.

== Life and work ==
He was born in Hallstadt as the son of a Master shoemaker. After taking drawing lessons at a local secondary school, he went to Bamberg in 1875, to study decorative painting. In 1880, he moved to Munich, became an assistant in the technical drawing school, and made efforts to enter the Academy of Fine Arts. He was accepted there in 1882. His instructors included Johann Caspar Herterich, Wilhelm Lindenschmit and Gabriel von Hackl.

In 1895 and 1904, he made study trips to Rome. There, he was influenced by Ludovico Seitz, the Director of the Vatican Galleries. Upon returning from his second trip, he was named a Professor of Art. His style was based largely upon later works by the Nazarene movement.

In 1915, he painted the "Bayerischen Feldmesse" (Bavarian Field Mass), which was reproduced and distributed widely during World War I, as a communion souvenir. Another work that was reproduced was a painting of the Fourteen Holy Helpers, created for the altar at the Basilica of St. Ann, Altötting.

Schleibner died in 1931 in Munich.
