= Ernst Platner =

German anthropologist, physician and philosopher

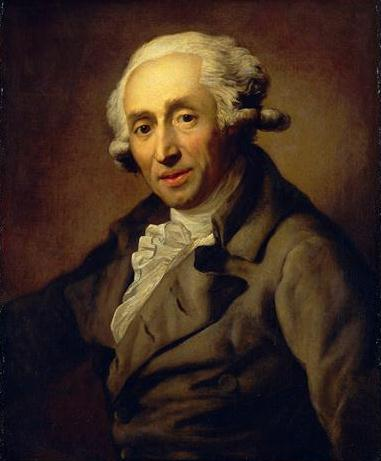
- Portrait by Anton Graff
- Born: 11 June 1744; Leipzig, Electorate of Saxony
- Died: 27 December 1818 (aged 74); Leipzig, Kingdom of Saxony
- Spouse: Dorothea Elisabeth Christiane Liebig (m. 1769; died 1795)
- Children: 5, including Eduard and Ernst Zacharias

Education
- Education: Leipzig University (M.D., 1767)
- Academic advisor: Johann August Ernesti

Philosophical work
- Era: 18th-century philosophy
- Region: Western philosophy
- School: Rationalism
- Institutions: Leipzig University
- Notable students: See list: J. G. Fichte; K. L. Reinhold; J. G. Seume
- Main interests: History of philosophy, medicine
- Notable ideas: The Unconscious; Pragmatic history Psychosomatic medicine

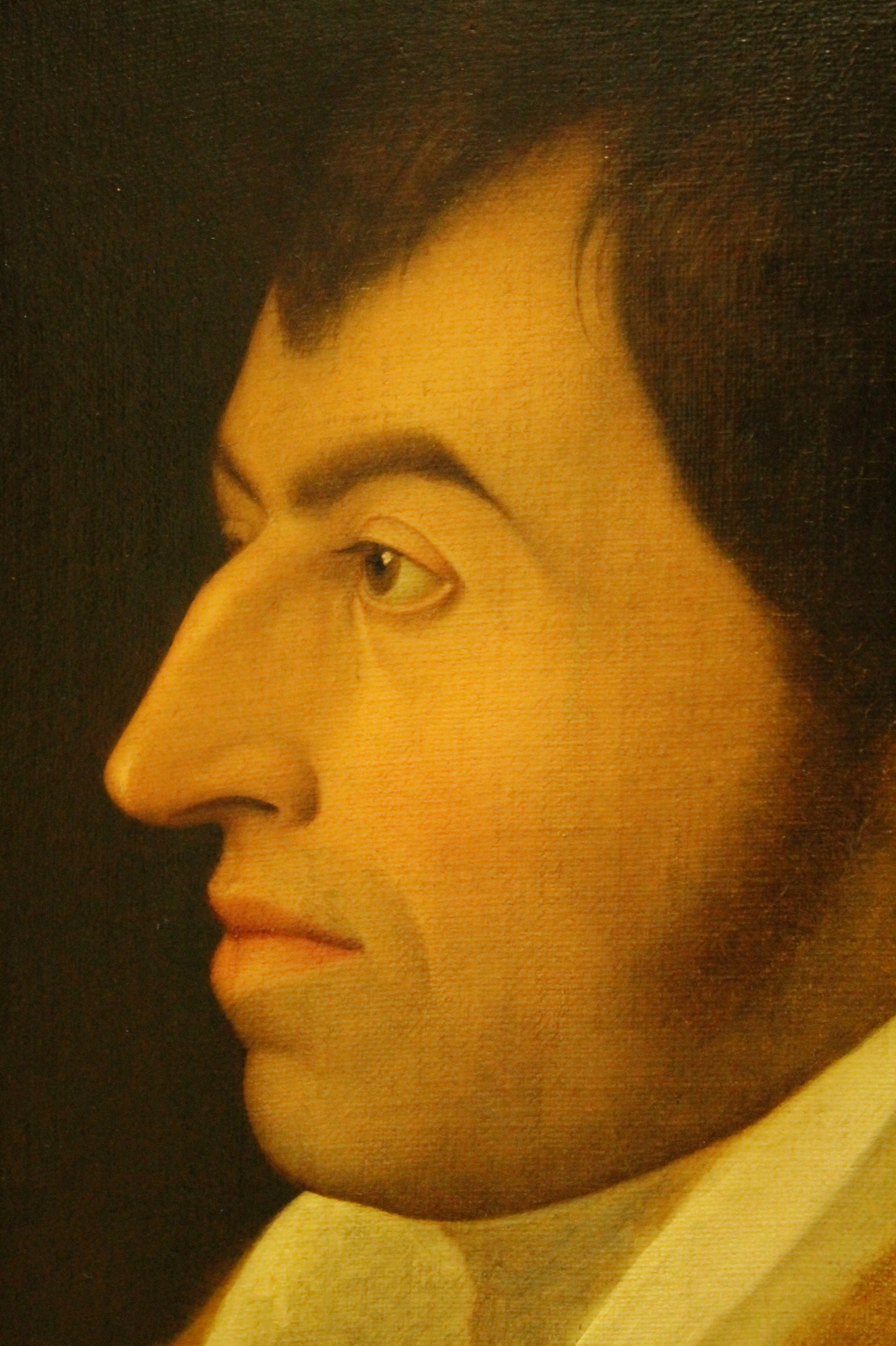
Ernst Platner in 1812, by Friedrich Overbeck

Ernst Platner (/ˈplɑːtnər/; German: [ˈplatnɐ]; 11 June 1744 – 27 December 1818) was a German anthropologist, physician and rationalist philosopher, born in Leipzig. He was the father of painter Ernst Zacharias Platner (1773–1855).

== Life ==
Following the death of his father in 1747, the philologist Johann August Ernesti became his foster father. He received his early education at the gymnasium in Altenburg, the Thomasschule in Leipzig and at the gymnasium in Gera. Afterwards, he studied at the University of Leipzig, where in 1770 he became an associate professor of medicine. Later at Leipzig, he was appointed a full professor of physiology (1780) and philosophy (1811). In 1783/84 and 1789/90 he served as university rector.

== Work ==
Platner was a follower of the teachings of Leibniz. He was the author of Anthropologie für Aerzte und Weltweise, one of the more important anthropological works of the Spätaufklärung (an epoch of German literature). This work was influential to scholars that included Johann Gottfried Herder, Friedrich Schiller and Karl Philipp Moritz. He believed in treating modern anthropology as a medical-philosophical science of the whole individual, a viewpoint that can be considered as a precursor of psychosomatic medicine.

Platner is credited with originally coining the term Unbewußtseyn (unconscious). He is also credited for coining the phrase "pragmatic history of the human faculty of cognition" (pragmatische Geschichte des menschlichen Erkentnißvermogens), later appropriated by Johann Gottlieb Fichte as "pragmatic history of the human spirit" (pragmatische Geschichte des menschlichen Geistes).

== Selected publications ==
- Anthropologie für Aerzte und Weltweise (Anthropology for Physicians and the Worldwise), 1772
- Neue Anthropologie für Aerzte und Weltweise (New Anthropology for Physicians and the Worldwise), 1790
- Über den Atheismus. Ein Gespräch (About Atheism. An Interview), 1783
- Philosophische Aphorismen nebst einigen Anleitungen zur philosophischen Geschichte (Philosophical Aphorisms with Some Principles for a History of Philosophy), Vol. 1: 1776, Vol. 2: 1782 (second edition: 1784, third edition: 1793)
- Quaestiones physiologicae (Questions of Physiology), 1794
- Quaestiones medicinae forensis (Questions of Forensic Medicine), 1797–1817
