= Hallstadt =

- Town
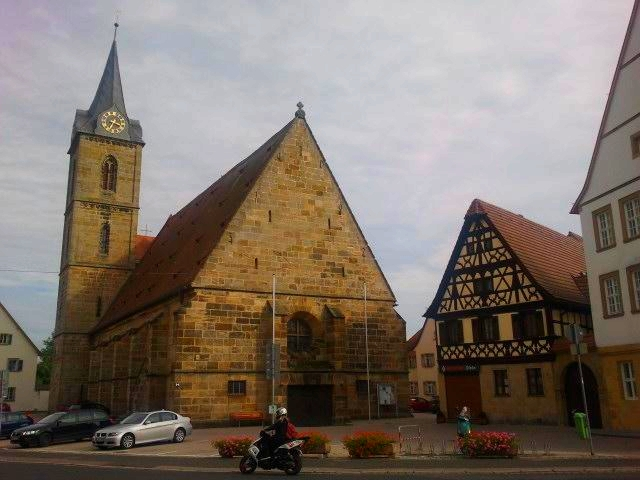
- Church of Saint Kilian

- Coat of arms

- Location of Hallstadt within Bamberg district
- Interactive map of Hallstadt
- Location within Germany Location within Bavaria
- Coordinates: 49°56′N 10°53′E
- Country: Germany
- State: Bavaria
- Admin. region: Oberfranken
- District: Bamberg

Government
  - Mayor (2020–26): Thomas Söder (CSU)

Area
  - Total: 14.6 km^{2} (5.6 sq mi)
- Elevation: 239 m (784 ft)

Population (2025-12-31)
  - Total: 8,755
  - Density: 600/km^{2} (1,550/sq mi)
- Time zone: UTC+01:00 (CET)
  - Summer (DST): UTC+02:00 (CEST)
- Postal codes: 96103
- Dialling codes: 0951
- Vehicle registration: BA
- Website: www.hallstadt.de

Hallstadt (German pronunciation: [ˈhalʃtat]) is a town in the Upper Franconian district of Bamberg on the left bank of the Main, 4 km north of Bamberg, Germany.

== Geography ==
Hallstadt borders in the south on the city of Bamberg and in the west on the Main. There are two constituent communities named Hallstadt (population 7,588) and Dörfleins (population 1,380). The town also has these traditional rural land units, known in German as Gemarkungen: Hallstadt and Dörfleins (it is traditional for a Gemarkung to be named after a town or village lying nearby)

== History ==
Archaeological digs have shown that there were settlers in the area who farmed the land in the New Stone Age, about 5000 BC.

About 670, the later Franconian Saint Kilian was preaching in Hallstadt and almost 50 years later Saint Boniface tried to convert Hallstadt’s Germans. Eventually, sometime between 741 and 747, the town was first named as Halazestat im Radensgove in a document issued by the Frankish Dukes Karlmann and Pepin the Short, and in 793, Charlemagne approved his father Pepin’s donations to the Würzburg Bishop Berwolf, among which was Halazestat. From 794 to 820, the Hallstadt Church of St. Kilian was built as one of Charlemagne’s 14 Slavic churches (Slavenkirchen), and in 805, Hallstadt became Charlemagne’s royal court after years earlier (793) he had spent the night here.

Two hundred years later, in 1007, Emperor Henry II donated the royal court to the Bishopric of Bamberg, which he had founded, and in 1013, by way of exchange, he acquired Hallstadt’s church and parish from the Bishop of Würzburg for the royal court at Gerau on the Upper Rhine.

Once the bridge across the Main had been finished by Bishop Lambert von Brun, the town also became important to trade. In 1430, Hallstadt was burnt down by the Hussites. By 1503 the town had recovered only well enough from this to be called a market town. However, only two generations later, in 1553, Margrave Albrecht Alcibiades von Brandenburg-Kulmbach occupied and destroyed Bamberg and Hallstadt.

From 1617 to 1618, witch trials took place under Prince-Bishop Johann Gottfried von Aschenhausen, as a result of which 53 townsfolk were put to death. What the plague had not wiped out three years earlier was razed in 1633 when Hallstadt was burnt down in the Thirty Years' War.

Between 1756 and 1763 came more occupations of Bamberg and Hallstadt by Frederick the Great’s soldiers.

In 1802, Elector Max Joseph of Bavaria made known his seizure of the High Monastery at Bamberg and of Franconia, and a few years later (1808), King Max – as he was by then known – visited the town. In the course of administrative reform in Bavaria, today’s community came into being under the Gemeindeedikt (“Community Edict”) of 1818.

In 1880, the town was connected to the railway network, and Hallstadt Railway Station was opened.

=== Recent history ===
In 1954, Hallstadt was raised to town and celebrated its 1,300th anniversary. In 1970 came the transfer of the outlying centres of Bruckertshof and Kramersfeld to Bamberg, and the new bridge across the Main, work upon which had already begun after the Second World War, was completed. In 1972, the community of Dörfleins was amalgamated with the town.

=== Population development ===
Within town limits, 6,589 inhabitants were counted in 1970, 7,436 in 1987 and 8,427 in 2000. On 30 June 2004, 8,560 inhabitants were reported, and three years later in 2007, it was 8,526.

== Politics ==
The mayor is Thomas Söder (CSU).

- 1996–2008: Erwin Braun (SPD)
- 2008–2014: Markus Zirkel (SPD)

The town council is made up of 20 members, listed here by party or voter community affiliation, and also with the number of seats that each holds, since the 2020 local elections:

- CSU: 9
- Bürgerblock/Freie Wähler Hallstadt: 5
- SPD: 3
- Alliance 90/The Greens: 3

In 1999, municipal tax revenue, converted to euros, amounted to €10,262,000 of which business taxes (net) amounted to €6,503,000. In 2005, municipal tax revenue amounted to €8,900,600.

=== Town partnerships ===
Hallstadt is cultivating town partnerships with Lempdes near Clermont-Ferrand in France and with Hallstatt in Austria.

== Economy and infrastructure ==
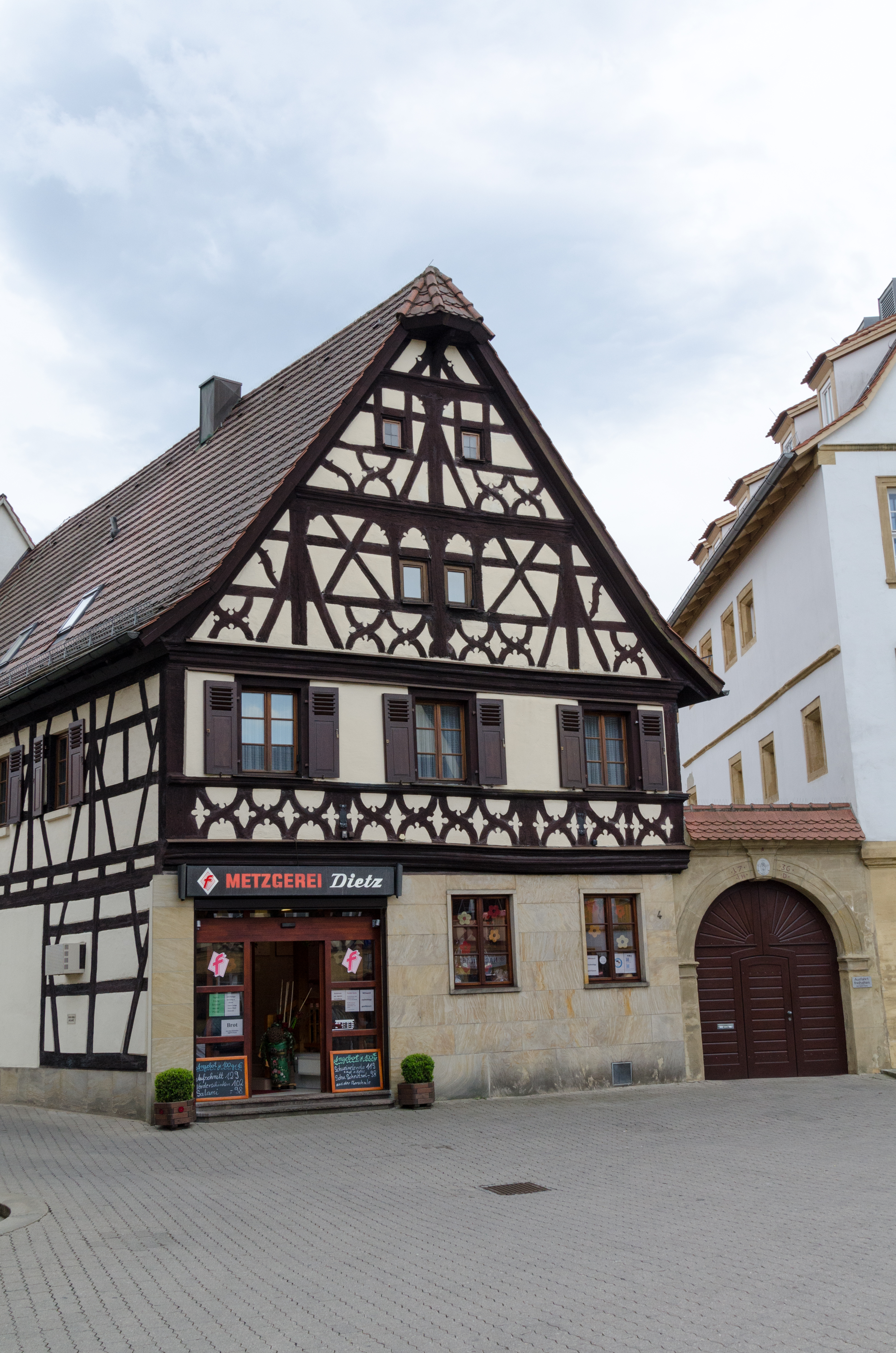
Hallstadt Marketplace

=== Economy ===
According to official statistics, there were 116 workers on the social welfare contribution rolls working in agriculture and forestry in 1998. In producing businesses this was 2,424, and in trade and transport 1,182. Worthy of mention as the biggest employer would be the firm Josef Leicht Maschinenbau, which employs more than 380 workers. In other areas, 653 workers on the social welfare contribution rolls are employed, and 2,998 such workers work from home. Nobody is employed in processing businesses. Seven businesses are in construction, and furthermore, in 1999, there were 50 agricultural operations with a working area of 672 ha, of which 582 ha was cropland and 89 ha was meadowland.

=== Education ===
In 2007, the following institutions existed in Hallstadt:

- three kindergartens with 325 places
- one elementary school

=== Security for the population ===
Aid organizations supply the required danger prevention for the population and all persons, buildings, waterways, real assets and so on that are found within the town.

==== Land rescue services ====
In the field of emergency health response, the aid organizations BRK (Bavarian Red Cross) and the Malteser Hilfsdienst (MHD, ≈ Order of Malta Ambulance Corps) supply the rescue service on land under public law for the town and for the district of Bamberg. Moreover, these two aid organizations supply medical units for the district’s protection in case of disaster.

The Bavarian Red Cross, Bamberg chapter, has a medical readiness plan, the BRK Bereitschaft Bamberg 3/Hallstadt. This is, among other things, responsible for the Hallstadt municipal area for the Bavarian Red Cross’s medical work.

==== Water rescue services ====
In the field of emergency health response on the town’s waterways, the Kreiswasserwacht (“District Water Watch”) Bamberg is represented by the Hallstadt chapter. It staffs the Hallstadt swimming pool in the summer months on weekends and holidays, complementing the pool’s lifeguards.

== Personalities ==
- Kaspar Schleibner (1863-1931), art professor and painter
