= Ludovico Seitz =

Italian painter

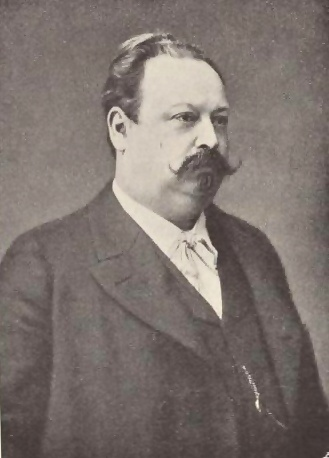
Ludovico Seitz (1899)

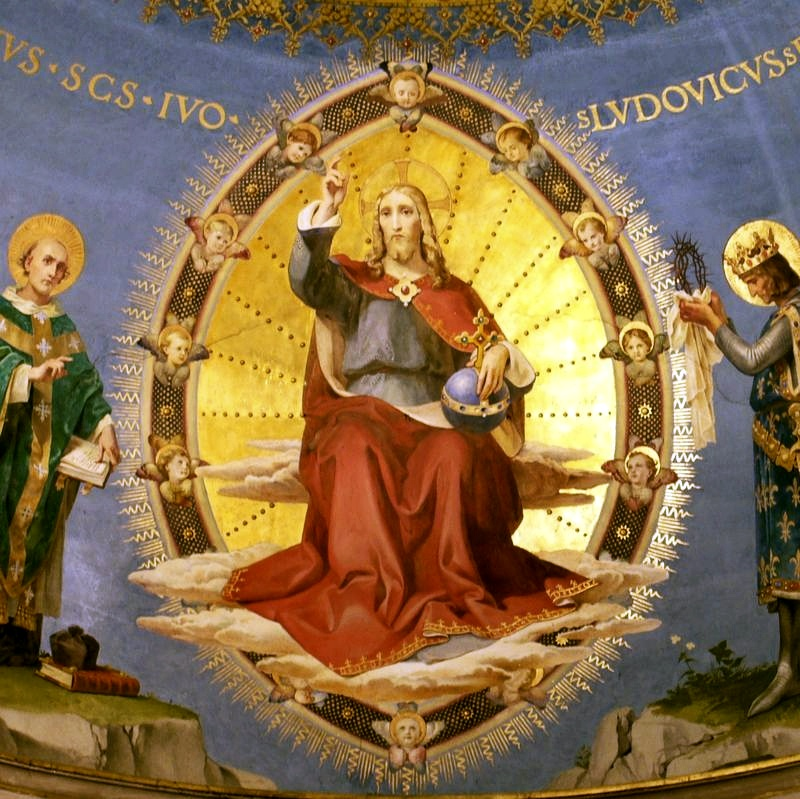
Christ, at Sant'Ivo dei Bretoni

Ludovico Seitz, or Ludwig Seitz (11 June 1844 – 11 September 1908) was an Italian painter of German ancestry, who served as Director of the Vatican Galleries.

== Life and work ==
He was born in Rome. His father was the painter, Alexander Maximilian Seitz, a member of the Nazarene movement; originally from Munich. His mother, Gertrud née Platner, was the daughter of the painter and diplomat, Ernst Zacharias Platner. King Ludwig I was his godfather.

He initially studied art with his father, then with Friedrich Overbeck and, later, from Peter von Cornelius. In 1887, he became an Inspector (curator) at the Vatican Galleries, and was promoted to Director in 1894. He belonged to several Catholic artists' associations and produced numerous religious frescoes, mostly in Nazarene style, but also with hints of Historicism.

Perhaps his best-known works are ceiling frescoes, commissioned by Pope Leo XIII, in the "Gallery of Candelabras" at the Apostolic Palace, which is now a part of the Vatican Museums. He also created paintings at Sant'Ivo dei Bretoni, a French church, and the chapel at the Basilica della Santa Casa. Together with his father, he painted murals at Đakovo Cathedral in Croatia.

Santa Maria dell’Anima, the German national church, has works by Seitz in the chapel dedicated to saints John of Nepomuk and Jan Sarkander, as well in the ceiling of the nave.

His students included the Bavarian church painter, Kaspar Schleibner, and the Belgian artist, Jozef Janssens, who also created religious works. His successor at the Galleries was the Italian painter and art historian, Pietro D’Achiardi.

Seitz died in 1908, in Albano Laziale.
