= Ernest de Bunsen =

Anglo-German writer

Ernst Christian Ludwig von Bunsen or Ernest de Bunsen (1819 in Rome – 1903 in London) was an Anglo-German writer whose speculative works proposing common origins of Buddhism, Essene Judaism and Christianity were later taken up as part of racist Aryan mythology. He was father of Maurice de Bunsen and grandfather of Mary de Bunsen, World War Two Air Transport Auxiliary pilot and author.

== Life ==
Bunsen was born in Rome where his father Christian von Bunsen was serving as a Prussian diplomat to the Vatican. His mother was Frances Waddington (1791-1876), sister of Lady Llanover. His father was the patron both of the mainstream orientalist Max Müller and of the strongly antisemitic orientalist Paul de Lagarde.

Ernest was educated at Berlin in a school for cadets and served in the Prussian Guards. He married Elizabeth Gurney, daughter of Samuel Gurney, the banker in 1845 and moved to London.

Bunsen's writings identified Brahmans as "pure Aryans." According to Bunsen the account of Genesis was to be read that Adam was the first Aryan, and the serpent in Eden the first Semite. Bunsen's theory that the "doctrine of the Angel-Messiah in Buddhism," as he called it, was transmitted first to the Essenes and then to Christianity fared little better in Britain than the theories of the British officer in India, Arthur Lillie, who converted to Buddhism and became the author of a number of texts on religion (and croquet).

His residence was at Abbey Lodge, a house bought for him and his wife in 1849 by his father-in-law in Hanover Terrace overlooking Regent′s Park, in Westminster. On 13 May 1903, he died at Abbey Lodge, and was buried at Leytonstone churchyard.

== Family ==
de Bunsen married on 5 August 1845 Elizabeth Gurney (1817–1903), daughter of Samuel Gurney and niece of Elizabeth Fry. She died at Abbey Lodge on 19 January 1903, in her 86th year. Their eldest son, Fritz, died in 1870; they had a second son, Sir Maurice de Bunsen. There were also two daughters, Hilda de Bunsen, wife of Baron Deichmann, and Marie de Bunsen.

== Selected works ==
- Die Einheit der Religionen im Zusammenhange mit den Völkerwanderungen der Urzeit und der Geheimlehre (Berlin, 1870).
- Plejaden und der Thierkreis (Berlin, 1879).
- The Angel-Messiah of Buddhists, Essenes and Christians (London, 1880).
- Islam, Or True Christianity (London, 1889).
