= Alexander Maximilian Seitz =

German painter

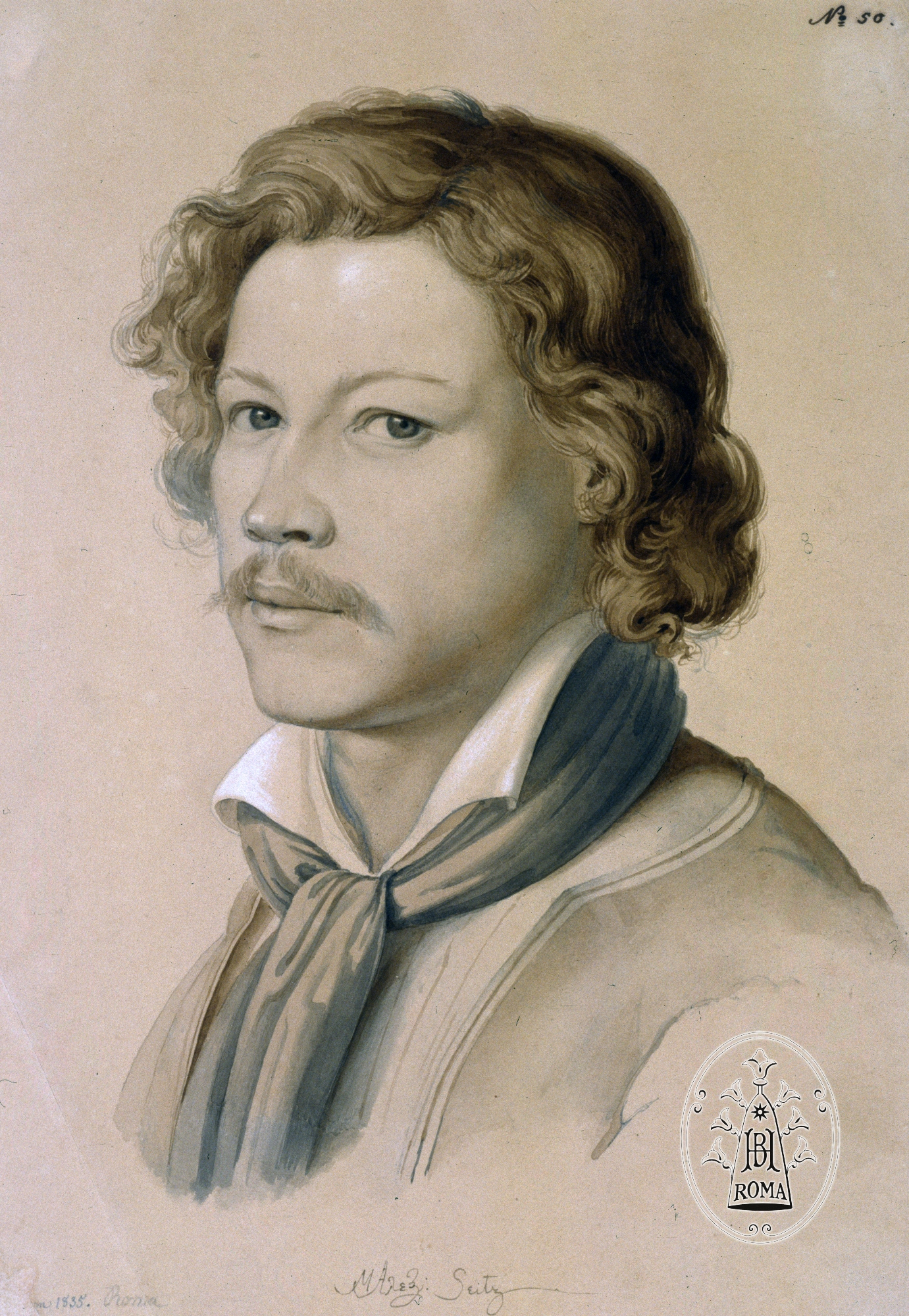
- Portrait by Johann Martin von Rohden (1835)
- Born: 1811; Munich, Germany
- Died: 18 April 1888 (aged 76–77); Rome, Italy
- Known for: Painting

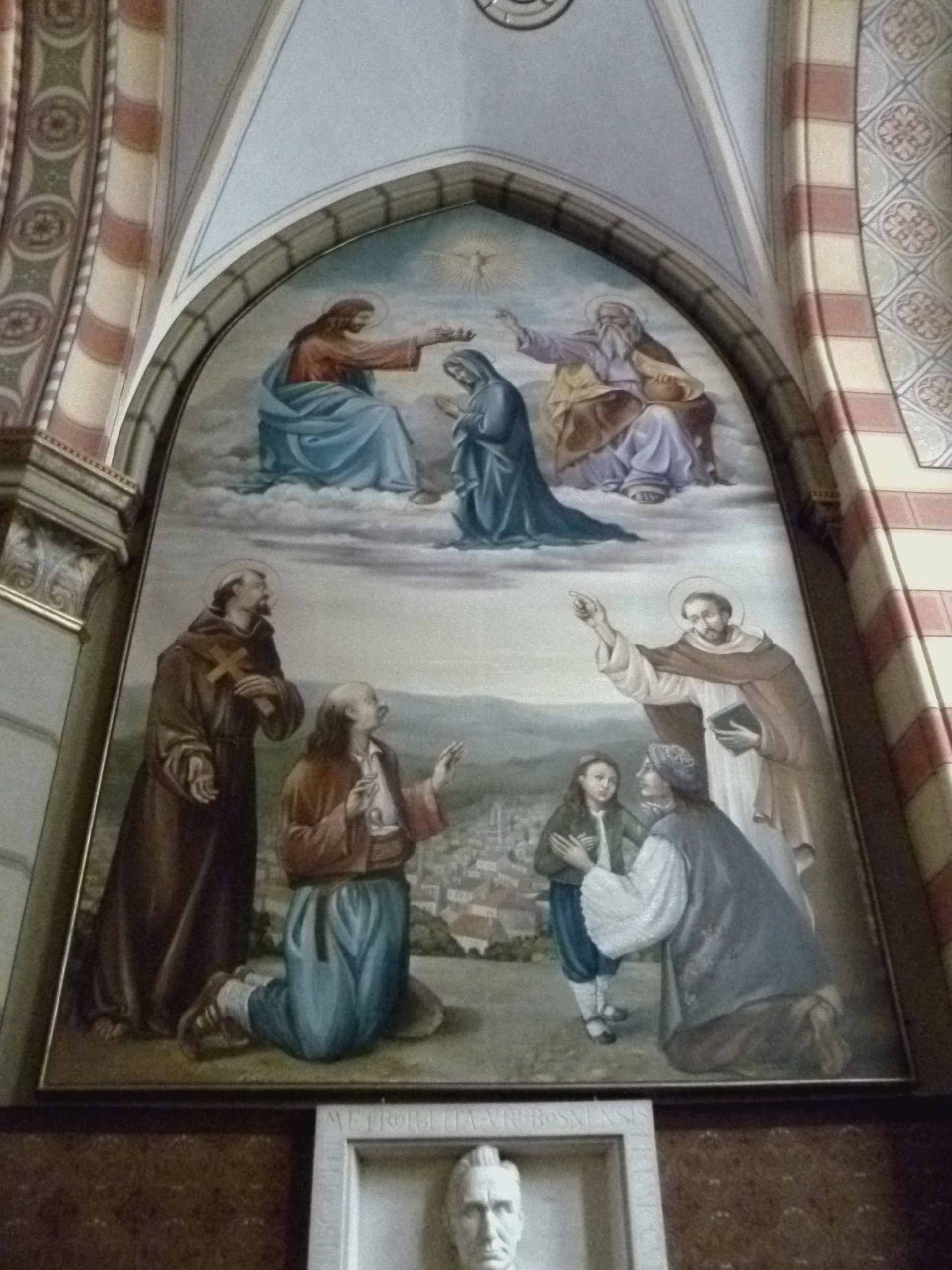
Sarajevo Cathedral

Alexander Maximilian Seitz (1811–1888) was a German painter and a leader of the Nazarene movement.

== Life and work ==
Seitz was born in Munich. He studied under Peter von Cornelius, and like Cornelius was a member of the Nazarene movement, a group of early 19th-century German Romantic painters who aimed to revive spirituality in art.

Two early pictures, Joseph sold by his Brethren and the Seven Sleepers, received speedy recognition. Heinrich Maria von Hess employed him on the frescoes in the Allerheiligen-Hofkirche (Court Church of All Saints). After he had painted compositions depicting four of the sacraments, Cornelius took him to Rome.

There Seitz found in Friedrich Overbeck a man of the same religious opinions, with a style which he at once sought to make his own. He aided Overbeck in carrying out the frescoes of the Evangelists and Apostles at Castel Gandolfo, and at a later date, when Overbeck's strength was no longer equal to the task, Seitz, with the aid of his son, Ludwig Seitz, painted frescoes in the cathedral at Diakovar (Đakovo) in Croatia partly according to Overbeck's and partly according to his own designs.

In 1846, he completed a set of three friezes depicting medieval scenes in pencil, ink and watercolor. He did an Ecce Homo in 1849. In 1853, he painted a "A Triptych depicting the Resurrected Christ with Agnes, Mary, John and Elisabeth and the Parables of Christ". In 1866, he painted The Angel Appearing to Joachim. In 1858, he painted a Mater Dolens.

With the help of his son, Seitz painted a cycle of pictures of saints for Herder of Freiburg. Besides some secular compositions, as the genre pictures of the life of the common people at Rome, he treated pre-eminently scenes and persons of the Old and New Testaments. His pictures of the Adoration of the Shepherds, Christ as the Friend of Children, Awakening of the Young Man of Naim, Tribute Money, Jacob and Esau, and The Finding of Moses, are in the spirit of Overbeck.

The St. Anthony, and St. Benedict, as engraved by the Capuchin Bernardo da Monaco, and his Mater Amabilis aroused admiration; an enthroned Madonna went to England. Among his other works are: Translation of St. Catherine to Sinai by angels, and a round picture of Rest on the Flight into Egypt. In this three angels worship Christ, who lies with outstretched arms on the lap of the mother, while at some distance is Joseph with the beast of burden. In the Trinità dei Monti in Rome he painted in fresco the return of the Prodigal son and Christ with heart aflame.

Seitz was one of many who commissioned to paint frescoes for the Metropolitan Cathedral of Athens of the Annunciation (Orthodox Church of Greece).
