= Maurice de Bunsen =

British diplomat

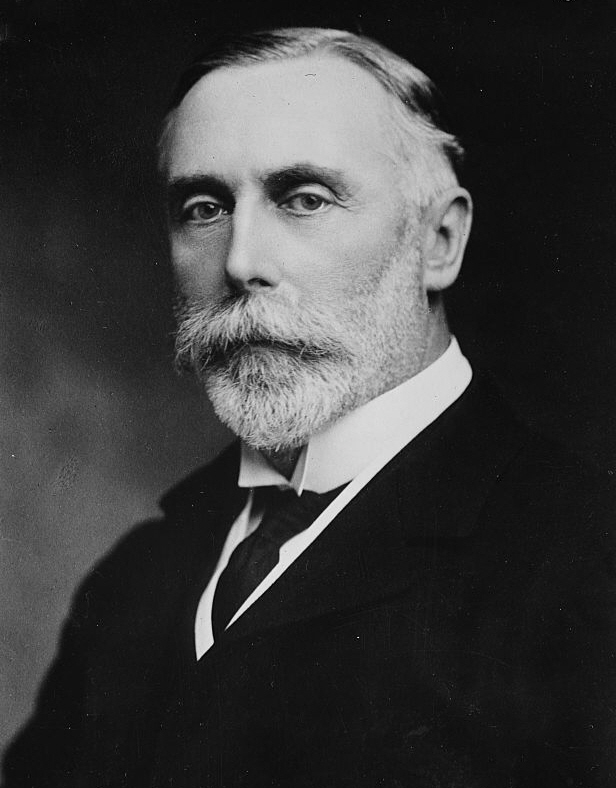
Sir Maurice de Bunsen in 1909

Sir Maurice William Ernest de Bunsen, 1st Baronet, GCMG, GCVO, CB, PC (8 January 1852 – 21 February 1932), was a British diplomat.

== Background and early life ==
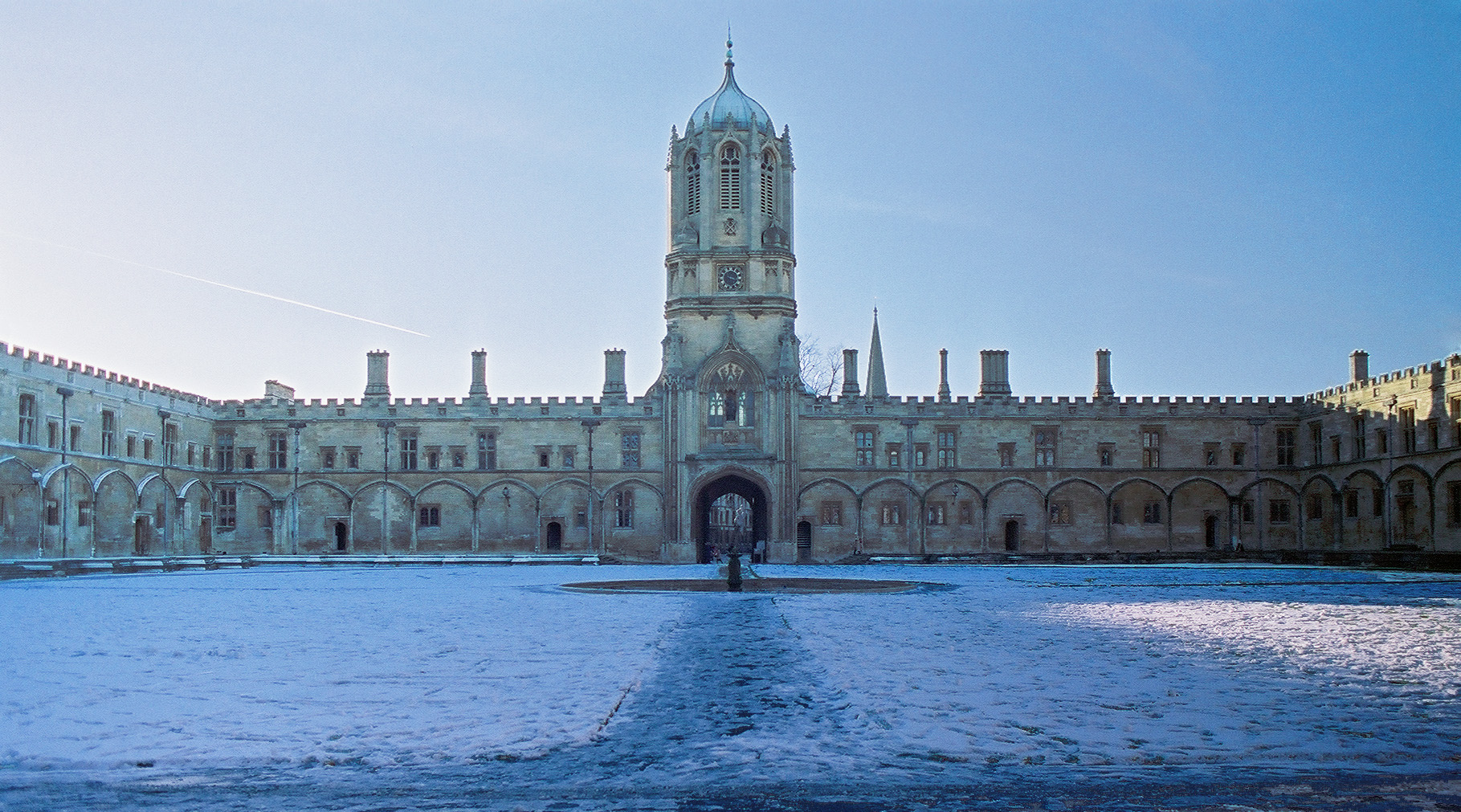
Christ Church, Oxford

De Bunsen was the son of Ernest de Bunsen, second son of Frances Bunsen and Baron von Bunsen, Prussian ambassador to London, by Elizabeth Gurney. He was educated at Rugby School, and Christ Church, Oxford, and entered the diplomatic service in 1877.

== Diplomatic career ==
De Bunsen was trained in the diplomatic service by Richard Lyons, 1st Viscount Lyons, and was a member of the Tory-sympathetic 'Lyons School' of British diplomacy. De Bunsen was appointed Third Secretary in 1879 and Second secretary in 1883. He served as Secretary of Legation in Tokyo 1891–1894, and as Consul-General in Siam 1894–1897. He was Secretary at Constantinople from 1897 until early September 1902, when he left for Paris to be Secretary of Embassy and Minister Plenipotentiary at the British Embassy to France. After three years in that city, he saw his first posting as head of station when he was appointed British Envoy Extraordinary and Minister Plenipotentiary at Lisbon in 1905. He was British Ambassador to Spain between 1906 and 1913 and to Austria between 1913 and 1914.

On 16 July 1914, reporting on what he had been told the previous day at a lunch with Count Heinrich von Lützow, who had learned of the planned aggression against Serbia and was trying to derail what he saw as a coming war, de Bunsen told Sir Edward Grey that "a kind of indictment is being prepared against the Servian Government for alleged complicity in the conspiracy which led to the assassination of the Archduke" and that "the Servian Government will be required to adopt certain definite measures in restraint of nationalistic and anarchistic propaganda, and that Austro-Hungarian Government are in no mood to parley with Servia, but will insist on immediate unconditional compliance, failing which force will be used. Germany is said to be in complete agreement with this procedure."

An old hand at the diplomatic game, Von Lutzow made a friend of Bunsen feeling obliged to disclose the truth. However he was a thorough, diligent public servant, and an efficient administrator, who would prove an exemplary wartime record. Reserved, modest and decorous, Sir Maurice would later be forced to resign, but he showed a shrewd alertness to the July crisis. So when he visited Berchtold at his country estate, Buchlau, on the 17th they shared a passion for horses. He cabled Sir Arthur Nicholson from Vienna warning him that it was a very grave situation; Austria intended to "compel" Serbia to yield.

His wife recorded in her diary

A strong note with ultimatum Lutzow told M is to be sent in the next week probably not acceptable to Serbia.

Whilst he may have believed Austrian innocence, Grey had already received the importance of the message loud and clear.

The Foreign Minister was reassuringly "charming", and the British showed no further curiosity about the leak of vital information. When on 25 July 1914 Serbia rejected Austria's ultimatum, de Bunsen wrote to Sir Edward Grey "...vast crowds parading the streets and singing patriotic songs till the small hours of the morning." Within a week, the rest of Europe was aflame, and he was recalled to London after the outbreak of the First World War.

He headed the De Bunsen Committee in 1915, established to determine British wartime policy toward the Ottoman Empire, and was also head of a special mission to South America in 1918. He retired from the diplomatic service in 1919.

== Honours ==
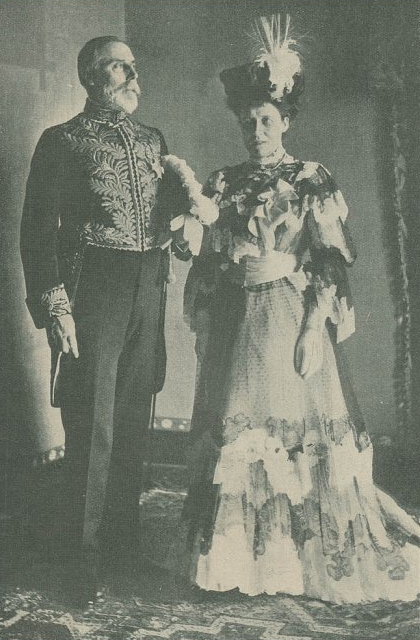
Sir Maurice de Bunsen and his wife Bertha Mary (née Lowry-Corry) c. 1905.

De Bunsen was sworn of the Privy Council in 1906 and created a baronet, of Abbey Lodge, Hanover Gate, in the Metropolitan borough of Saint Marylebone, in 1919. He died in February 1932, aged 80, when the baronetcy became extinct.

== Family ==
De Bunsen married, in 1899, Bertha Mary Lowry-Corry. They had four daughters

- Hilda Violet Helena de Bunsen (1900–), married firstly Major Guy Yerburgh (d. 1926), and secondly Major-General Sir Guy Salisbury-Jones
- Elizabeth Cicely de Bunsen (1902–), married Lieutenant Colonel Archibald Vivien Campbell Douglas (1902–1977)
- Rosaline Margaret De Bunsen (1903–1968)
- Mary de Bunsen (1910–1982), Air Transport Auxiliary pilot and author

Diplomatic posts
Preceded by Sir Arthur Nicolson, Bt	British Ambassador to Spain; 1906–1913	Succeeded by Sir Arthur Henry Hardinge
Preceded by Sir Fairfax Cartwright	British Ambassador to Austria; 1913–1914	No representation due to the First World War
Baronetage of the United Kingdom
New creation	Baronet (of Abbey Lodge); 1919–1932	Extinct
