= Basilica of St. Ann, Altötting =

Coordinates: 48°13′40″N 12°40′25″E

Basilica of St. Ann
- Basilika St. Anna
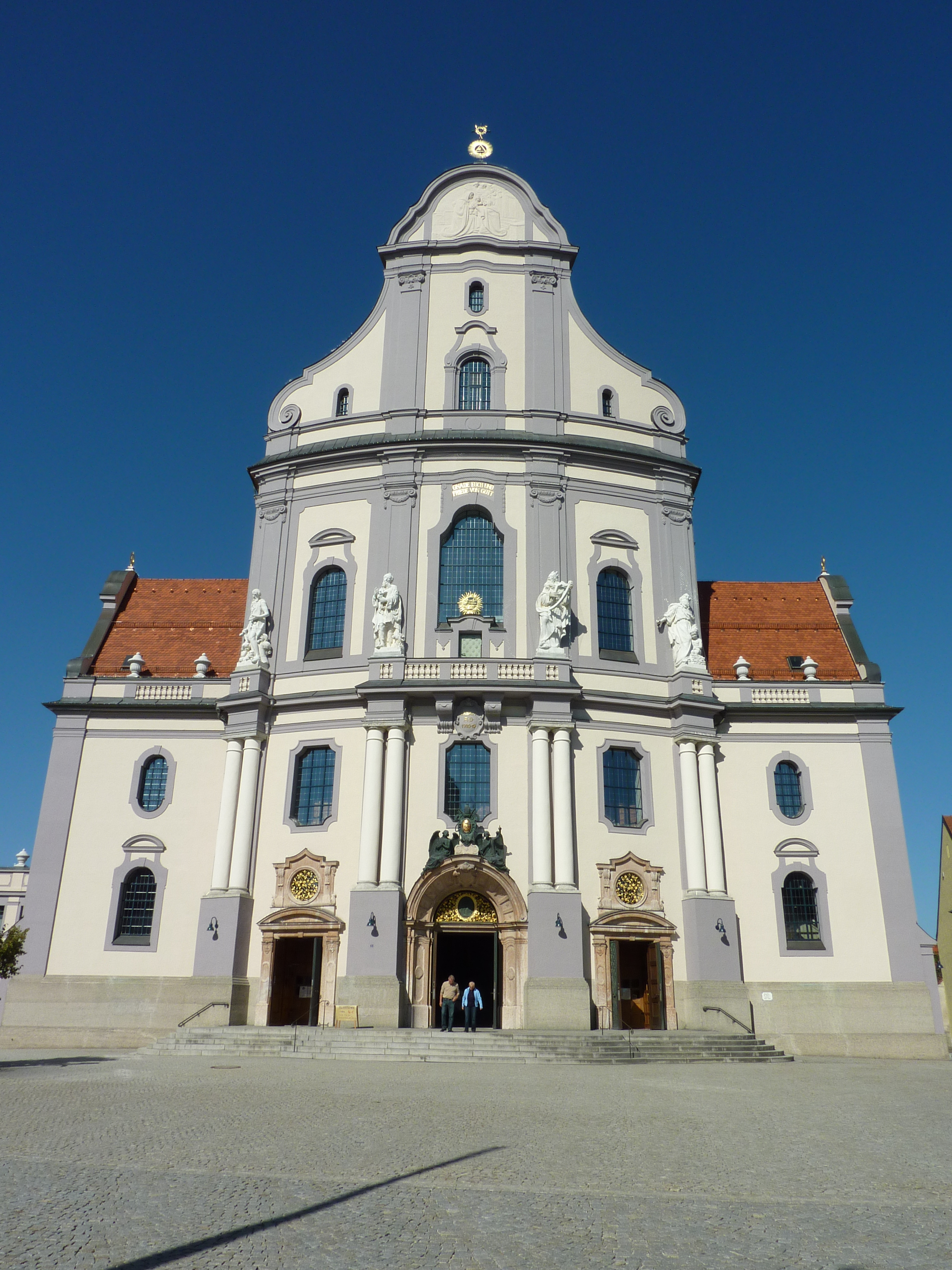
- Location: Altötting, Bavaria
- Country: Germany
- Denomination: Roman Catholic Church

The Basilica of St. Ann (German: Basilika St. Anna ) also called Altötting Basilica It is the main place of Catholic worship of Altötting, Bavaria, in the diocese of Passau. It is the largest church built in Germany in the twentieth century and is located in the Capuchin convent in Bruder-Konrad-Platz.

In 1913 Pope Pius X elevated it to the rank of minor basilica.

The current basilica was designed in neo-baroque style by Johann Baptist Schott inspired by the convent church of Fürstenfeld. The construction was financed with donations from Bavaria. The works took two and a half years and ended October 13, 1912 being consecrated by the bishop of Passau Sigismund Felix von Ow-Felldorf.

== See also ==
- Roman Catholicism in Germany
- St. Ann

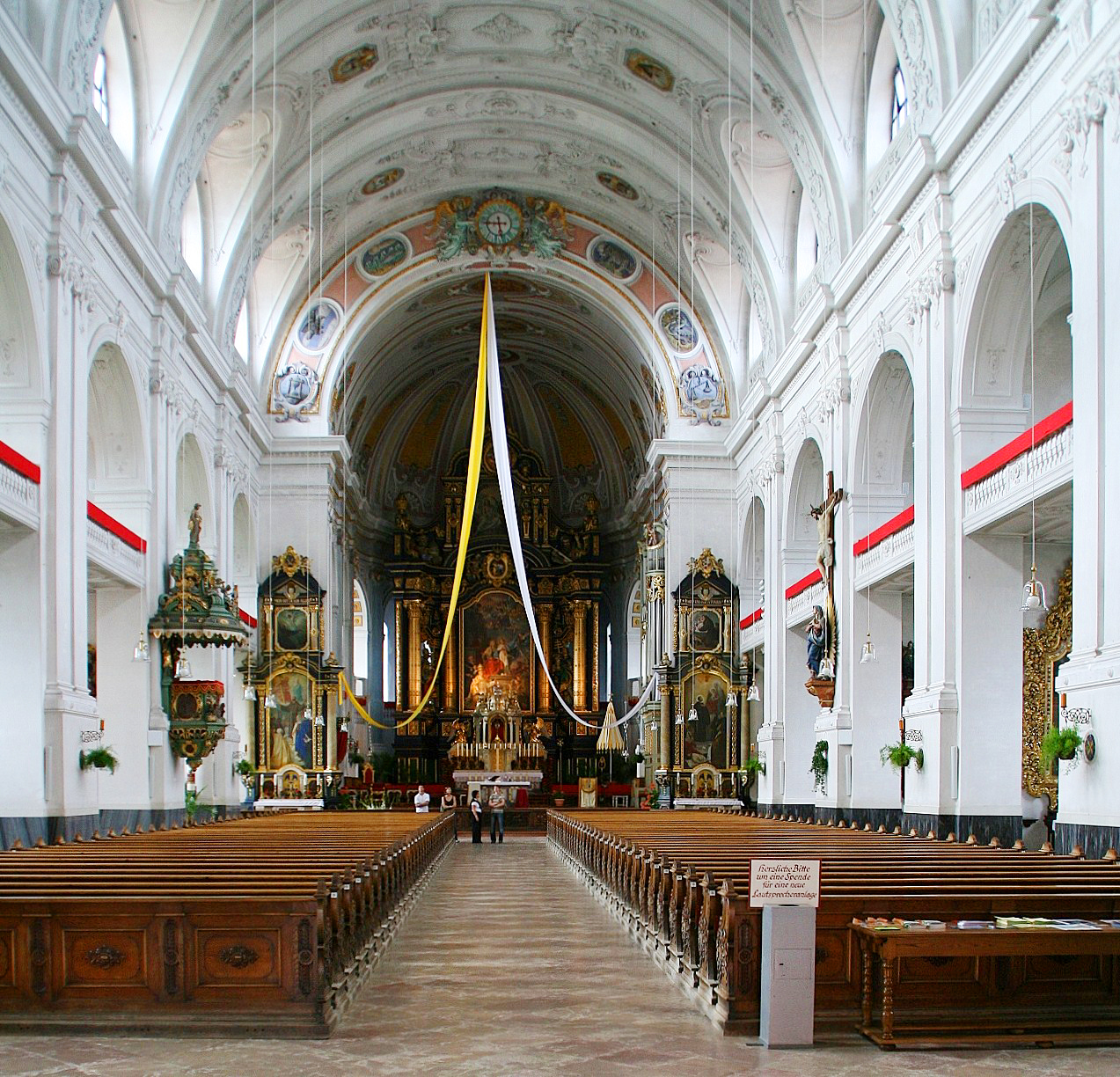
Internal view
