= Christian Charles Josias von Bunsen =

German diplomat and scholar (1791–1860)

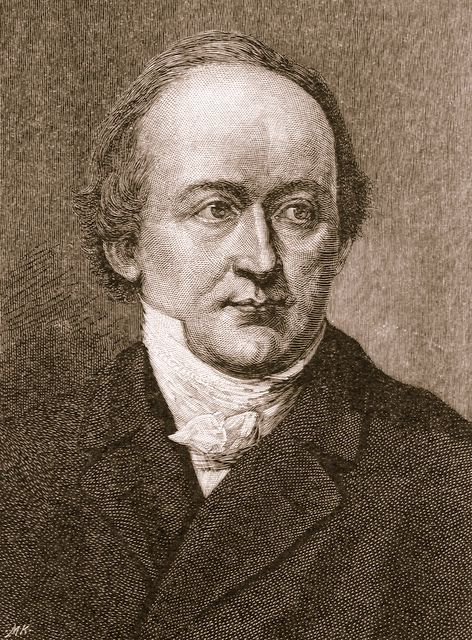

Prussian Envoy in London
- In office 1841–1854
- Preceded by: Heinrich von Bülow
- Succeeded by: Albrecht von Bernstorff

Prussian Envoy to Bern
- In office 1835–1841
- Preceded by: Theodor von Rochow
- Succeeded by: Karl von Werther

Prussian Envoy to Rome
- In office 1827–1838
- Preceded by: Barthold Georg Niebuhr
- Succeeded by: Ludwig August von Buch

Personal details
- Born: Christian Karl Josias von Bunsen; 25 August 1791
- Died: 28 November 1860 (aged 69)
- Spouse: Frances Waddington
- Children: 10

Christian Charles Josias, Baron von Bunsen (German: Christian Karl Josias Freiherr von Bunsen; 25 August 1791 – 28 November 1860) was a German diplomat and scholar. He worked in the Papal States and England for a large part of his career.

== Life ==
=== Early life ===
Bunsen was born in Korbach, an old town in the German principality of Waldeck. His father was a farmer driven by poverty to become a soldier. Having studied at the Korbach gymnasium (a type of superior state grammar school) and at Marburg University, Bunsen went in his nineteenth year to the University of Göttingen, where he studied philosophy under Christian Gottlob Heyne, and supported himself by teaching and later by acting as tutor to William Backhouse Astor, John Jacob's son. Bunsen had been recommended to Astor by Heyne. He won the university prize essay of the year 1812 with his treatise, De Iure Atheniensium Hœreditario (“Athenian Law of Inheritance”), and a few months later the University of Jena granted him the honorary degree of doctor of philosophy.

During 1813 he traveled extensively with Astor in Germany and Italy. On his return to the University of Göttingen, he and his friends formed the nucleus of a philological and philosophical society, and he pursued a vast system of kindred studies, including Semitic and Sanskrit philology. He studied the religion, laws, language, and literature of the Teutonic races, perfecting his knowledge of the Scandinavian languages on a visit to Denmark and Sweden. He had read Hebrew when a boy, and now worked on Arabic at the Ludwig-Maximilians-Universität München, on Persian at Leiden University, and Norse at the University of Copenhagen. At the University of Vienna, he met Friedrich von Schlegel; at the Ludwig-Maximilians-Universität München, Schelling and Thiersch; and he joined the latter in studying Persian, and read law with Feuerbach.

=== Rome ===
Historian Barthold Georg Niebuhr's work and character had aroused Bunsen's enthusiasm, and at the close of 1815 he went to the Friedrich Wilhelm University of Berlin, to show Niebuhr the plan of research which he had mapped out. He remained some months in the company of the historian. Niebuhr was so impressed with Bunsen's ability that, two years later, when he became Prussian envoy to the papal court, he made the young scholar his secretary. The intervening years Bunsen spent in assiduous labour among the libraries and collections of Paris and Florence, where he again joined Astor. When Astor returned to the United States, Bunsen became the French teacher of a Mr. Cathcart, an English gentleman. In 1816, he continued his studies of Persian and Arabic in Paris under Sylvestre de Sacy.

In July 1817 he married Frances Waddington, eldest daughter and co-heiress of Benjamin Waddington of Llanover, Monmouthshire, an English clergyman. The plan of an improved German translation of the Bible was first suggested to Bunsen by his young wife. Cornelius, Overbeck, Brandis, and Platner were the inseparable companions of the Bunsens. The Bunsens' lodgings in the Palazzo Caffarelli on the Capitoline Hill, where they lived 22 years, became a resort of many distinguished persons.

As secretary to Niebuhr, Bunsen was brought into contact with the Vatican movement for the establishment of the papal church in the Prussian dominions, to provide for the largely increased Catholic population. He was among the first to realize the importance of this new vitality on the part of the Vatican, and he made it his duty to provide against its possible dangers by urging upon the Prussian court the wisdom of fair and impartial treatment of its Catholic subjects. In this object he was at first successful, and both from the Vatican and from Frederick William III, who put him in charge of the legation on Niebuhr's resignation, he received unqualified approbation.

Though not within the scope of the great plan of his life, Bunsen contributed largely to the Beschreibung der Stadt Rom (3 vols., 1830–43) the greater part of the topographical communications on ancient Rome, and all the investigations into the early history of Christian Rome. The first visit of the Egyptologist Champollion to Rome formed an epoch in Bunsen's antiquarian studies. However, his argument in support of Champollion's priority over Young was based upon an insufficient knowledge of Young's publication dates. He became himself a zealous auditor of Champollion, and also encouraged Lepsius in the study of hieroglyphics. The Archaeological Institute, established in 1829, found in Bunsen its most active supporter. Bunsen founded the Protestant hospital on the Tarpeian Rock in 1835.

Owing partly to the wise statesmanship of Count Spiegel, archbishop of Cologne, an arrangement was made by which the thorny question of "mixed" marriages (i.e., between Catholic and Protestant) would have been happily solved; but the archbishop died in 1835, the arrangement was never ratified, and the Prussian king was foolish enough to appoint as Spiegel's successor the narrow-minded partisan Baron Droste. The pope gladly accepted the appointment, and in two years the forward policy of the Jesuits had brought about the strife which Bunsen and Spiegel had tried to prevent. Bunsen rashly recommended that Droste should be seized, but the coup was so clumsily attempted, that the incriminating documents were, it is said, destroyed in advance. The government, in this impasse, took the safest course, refused to support Bunsen, and accepted his resignation in April 1838.

=== England ===
After leaving Rome, where he had become intimate with all that was most interesting in the cosmopolitan society of the papal capital, Bunsen went to England, where, except for a short term as Prussian ambassador to Switzerland (1839–1841), he spent the rest of his official life. The accession to the throne of Prussia of Frederick William IV, on 7 June 1840, made a great change in Bunsen's career. Ever since their first meeting in 1828 the two men had been close friends and had exchanged ideas in an intimate correspondence, published under Ranke's editorship in 1873. Enthusiasm for evangelical religion and admiration for the Anglican Church they held in common, and Bunsen was the instrument naturally selected for realizing the king's fantastic scheme of setting up at Jerusalem a Prusso-Anglican bishopric as a sort of advertisement of the unity and aggressive force of Protestantism.

The special mission of Bunsen to England, from June to November 1841, was completely successful, in spite of the opposition of English Tractarians and Lutheran extremists. The Jerusalem bishopric, with the consent of the British government and the active encouragement of the archbishop of Canterbury and the bishop of London, was duly established, endowed with Prussian and English money, and remained for some forty years an isolated symbol of Protestant unity and a rock of stumbling to Anglican Catholics.

During his stay in England Bunsen had made himself very popular among all classes of society, and he was selected by Queen Victoria, out of three names proposed by the king of Prussia, as ambassador to the Court of St. James's. In this post he remained for thirteen years. His tenure of the office coincided with the critical period in Prussian and European affairs which culminated in the revolutions of 1848. Bunsen had realized the significance of the signs that heralded these revolutions, and tried in vain to move Frederick William to a policy which would have placed him at the head of a Germany united and free. In Berlin in 1844, he had been asked to set forth his views on the question of granting a constitution to Prussia, and he had presented a series of memorials representing the need of a deliberative assembly, and had also made a plan of a constitution modeled on that of England.

With the visionary schemes of Frederick William, whether that of setting up a strict episcopal organization in the Evangelical Church in Prussia, or that of reviving the defunct ideal of the medieval Empire, Bunsen found himself increasingly out of sympathy. He felt bitterly the humiliation of Prussia by Austria after the victory of the reaction; and in 1852 he set his signature reluctantly to the treaty which, in his view, surrendered the "constitutional rights of Schleswig and Holstein". His whole influence was now directed to withdrawing Prussia from the blighting influence of Austria and Russia, and attempting to draw closer the ties that bound her to Britain. On the outbreak of the Crimean War he urged Frederick William to throw in his lot with the western powers, and create a diversion in the north-east which would have forced Russia at once to terms. The rejection of his advice, and the proclamation of Prussia's attitude of "benevolent neutrality", led him in April 1854 to offer his resignation, which was accepted. He was elected a Foreign Honorary Member of the American Academy of Arts and Sciences in 1853.

=== Retirement ===
Bunsen's life as a public man was now practically at an end. He retired first to a villa on the Neckar near Heidelberg and later to Bonn. He refused to stand for a seat, in the Liberal interest, in the Lower House of the Prussian diet, but continued to take an active interest in politics, and in 1855 published in two volumes a work, Die Zeichen der Zeit: Briefe, etc., which exercised an immense influence in reviving the Liberal movement which the failure of the revolution had crushed. In September 1857 Bunsen attended, as the king's guest, a meeting of the Evangelical Alliance at Berlin; and one of the last papers signed by Frederick William, before his mind gave way in October, was that which conferred upon him the title of baron and a peerage for life. In 1858, at the special request of the regent (afterwards the emperor) William, he took his seat in the Prussian House of Lords, and, though remaining silent, supported the new ministry, of which his political and personal friends were members.

Literary work was, however, his main preoccupation during all this period. Two discoveries of ancient manuscripts made during his stay in London, the one containing a shorter text of the Epistles of St Ignatius, and the other an unknown work On All the Heresies, by Bishop Hippolytus, had already led him to write his Hippolytus and his Age: Doctrine and Practice of Rome under Commodus and Severus (1852).

He now concentrated all his efforts upon a translation of the Bible with commentaries, the Bibelwerk. While this was in preparation he published his God in History, in which he contends that the progress of mankind marches parallel to the conception of God formed within each nation by the highest exponents of its thought. At the same time he carried through the press, assisted by Samuel Birch, the concluding volumes of his work (published in English as well as in German) Egypt's Place in Universal History. This work contained a reconstruction of Egyptian chronology, together with an attempt to determine the relation in which the language and the religion of that country stand to the development of each among the more ancient non-Aryan and Aryan races. His ideas on this subject were most fully developed in two volumes published in London before he left England. (Note: Outlines of the Philosophy of Universal History as applied to Language and Religion (2 vols., 1854); (Chisholm 1911, p. 800))

His greatest work, Bibelwerk für die Gemeinde, (Note: “Bible Commentary for the Community”) the first part of which was published in 1858, was intended to be completed in 1862. It had occupied his attention for nearly 30 years, as the grand center-point to which all his literary and intellectual energies were to be devoted, but he died before he could finish it. Three volumes of the Bibelwerk were published at his death. (Note: these were the first, second and fifth) The work was completed in the same spirit with the aid of manuscripts under the editorship of Hollzmann and Kamphausen. (Note: in nine volumes (1858–70))

=== Death ===
In 1858 Bunsen's health began to fail; visits to Cannes in 1858 and 1859 brought no improvement, and he died on 28 November 1860, in Bonn. One of his last requests having been that his wife would write down recollections of their common life, she published his Memoirs in 1868, which contain much of his private correspondence. The German translation of these Memoirs has added extracts from unpublished documents, throwing a new light upon the political events in which he played a part. Baron Humboldt's letters to Bunsen were printed in 1869.

== Family ==
Bunsen's English connection, both through his wife (d. 1876) and through his own long residence in London, was further increased in his family. He had ten children, including five sons,

- Henry (1818–1855) became a clergyman and a naturalised Englishman.
- Ernest (1819–1903), in 1845 married an Englishwoman, Miss Gurney, subsequently resided and died in London. He was a scholarly writer, who published various works both in German and in English, notably on Aryan origins, Biblical chronology, and other questions of comparative religion. Ernest's son, Sir Maurice de Bunsen (b. 1852), entered the English diplomatic service in 1877; and after a varied experience became minister at Lisbon in 1905. His youngest grand daughter through Maurice was Mary de Bunsen, World War Two Air Transport Auxiliary pilot and author.
- Karl (Charles; 1821–1887) had a career in the German diplomatic service.
- Georg (1824–1896) was for some time was an active politician in Germany, eventually retired to live in London. He wrote his father's biography for the ninth edition of Encyclopædia Britannica. He was married to Emma Birkbeck and their grandson Ernest Henderson founded the Sheraton Hotels chain.
- Theodor (1832–1892) had a career in the German diplomatic service.
- Emilie (1827–1911).

== Works ==
- Beschreibung der Stadt Rom, 3 Bände 1840–43.
- Die Basiliken des christlichen Roms, 1843.
- Die Verfassung der Kirche der Zukunft. 1845 (online)
- Ägyptens Stelle in der Weltgeschichte, 5 Bände, 1844–57.
  - Vol. 1, 1845 vol. 1, pp. 0-173, vol. 1, pp. 174-371, vol. 1, pp. 372-583, vol. 1, pp. 584-end
  - Vol. 2, 1844 vol. 2, pp. 0-229, vol. 2, pp. 230-panel
  - Vol. 3, 1845 vol. 3, together with vol. 4.
  - Vol. 4, Catalogue vol. 4, Catalogue
  - Vol. 5, in two parts, 1857 vol. 5.1, pp. 0-299, vol. 5.1, pp. 300-end, vol. 5.2, pp. 0-281, vol. 5.2, pp. 282-529, vol. 5.2, pp. 530-end
- Ignatius von Antiochien und seine Zeit, 1847.
- Die Deutsche Bundesverfassung und ihr eigenthümliches Verhältniß zu den Verfassungen Englands und der Vereinigten Staaten. Sendschreiben an die zum Deutschen Parlamente berufene Versammlung, 1848.
- Vorschlag für die unverzügliche Bildung einer Vollständigen Reichsverfassung während der Verweserschaft, zur Hebung der inneren Anstände und zur kräftigen Darstellung des Einen Deutschlands dem Auslande gegenüber. Zweites Sendschreiben an die zum Deutschen Parlamente berufene Versammlung, 1848.
- Hippolytus und seine Zeit, 2 Bände, 1852/53 (engl. Hippolytus and his age: or, The beginnings and prospects of Christianity)
  - Vol I (online)
  - Vol. II (online)
- Christianity and Mankind. 7 Bde 1855
  - Vol III & IV: Outlines of the Philosophy of Universal History. London 1854 (online)
  - Vol VII: Christianity and Mankind: Their Beginnings and Prospects (online)
- Die Zeichen der Zeit, 2 Bände, 1855. (engl: Signs of the Times 1856)
- Gott in der Geschichte oder Der Fortschritt des Glaubens an eine sittliche Weltordnung, 3 Bände, Leipzig 1857/58.
- Allgemeines evangelisches Gesang- und Gebetbuch zum Kirchen- und Hausgebrauch, 1833.
- Vollständiges Bibelwerk für die Gemeinde, 9 Bände, 1858–70.
- The Law of Slavery in the United States, 1863 (online)
