= Barthold Georg Niebuhr =

Danish-German statesman and historian (1776–1831)

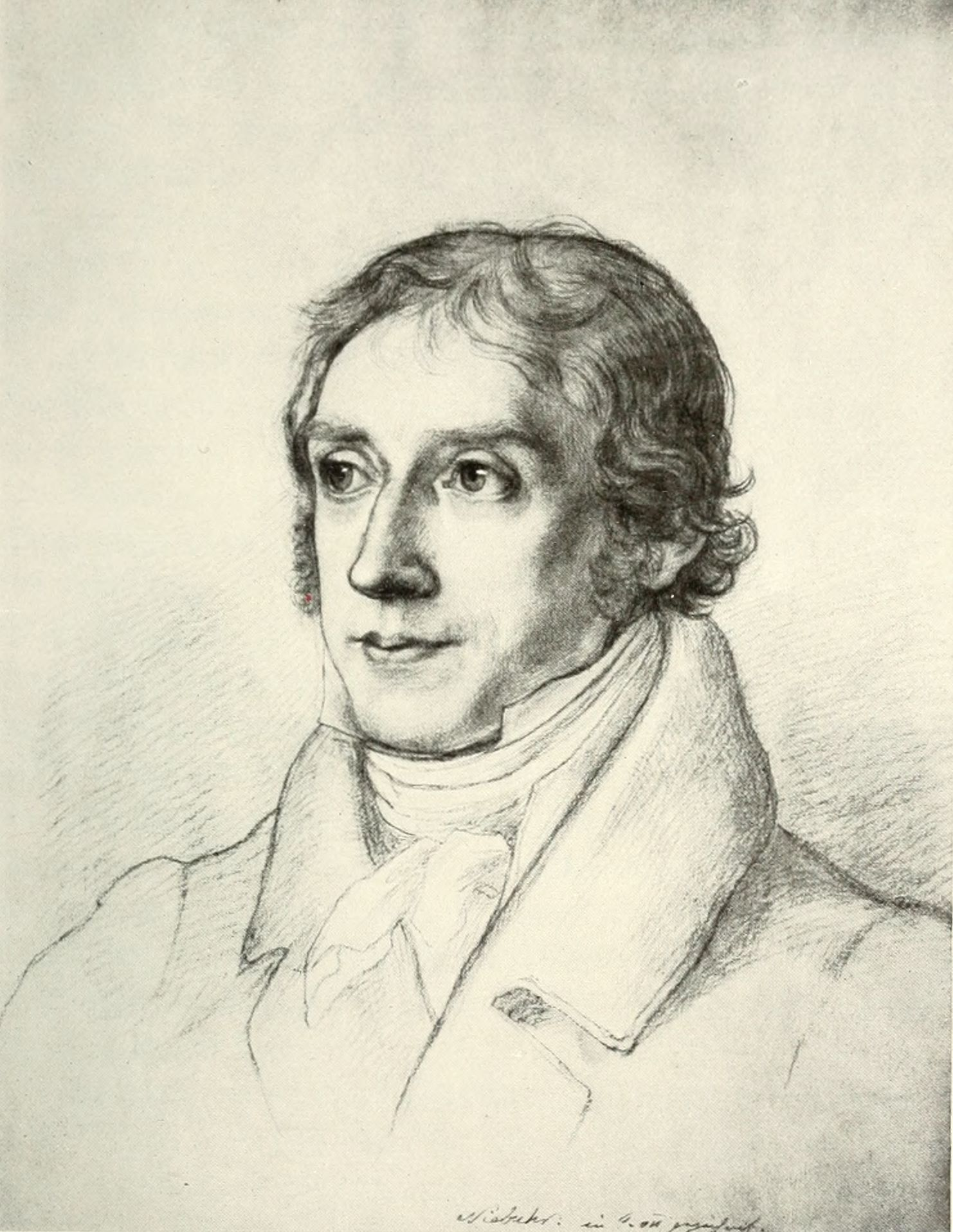
- Barthold Georg Niebuhr (drawing by Louise Seidler)
- Born: 27 August 1776; Copenhagen, Denmark–Norway
- Died: 2 January 1831 (aged 54); Bonn, Prussia
- Resting place: Alter Friedhof, Bonn
- Parent: Carsten Niebuhr (father)

Barthold Georg Niebuhr (27 August 1776 – 2 January 1831) was a Danish–German statesman, banker, and historian who became Germany's leading historian of Ancient Rome and a founding father of modern scholarly historiography. By 1810 Niebuhr was inspiring German patriotism in students at the University of Berlin by his analysis of Roman economy and government. Niebuhr was a leader of the Romantic era and symbol of German national spirit that emerged after the defeat at Jena. But he was also deeply rooted in the classical spirit of the Age of Enlightenment in his intellectual presuppositions, his use of philological analysis, and his emphasis on both general and particular phenomena in history.

== Education ==
Niebuhr was born in Copenhagen, the son of Carsten Niebuhr, a prominent German geographer resident in that city. His father provided his early education. By 1794 the precocious young Niebuhr had already become an accomplished classical scholar who read several languages. That year he entered the University of Kiel, where he studied law and philosophy. There he formed an important friendship with Madame Hensler, the widowed daughter-in-law of one of the professors, six years older than himself. He also made the acquaintance of her sister, Amelie Behrens, whom he subsequently married. In 1796 he left Kiel to become private secretary to the Danish finance minister, Count Schimmelmann, but in 1798 he gave up this appointment and travelled in Great Britain, spending a year at Edinburgh studying agriculture and physics. Of his stay in Great Britain, he said "my early residence in England gave me one important key to Roman history. It is necessary to know civil life by personal observation in order to understand such states as those of antiquity. I never could have understood a number of things in the history of Rome without having observed England."

In 1799 he returned to Denmark, where he entered the state service; in 1800 he married Amalie Behrens (1773–1815) and settled at Copenhagen. In 1804 he became chief director of the national bank. After the death of his first wife, Niebuhr married (1816) Margarete Henslen (1787–1831), with whom he had one son, Marcus, and three daughters, Amalie, Lucia and Cornelia.

== To Prussia ==
In September 1806, he quit the Denmark post for a similar appointment in Prussia. He showed much business ability in his banking work, which he attributed to his life in England and Scotland. He arrived in Prussia on the eve of the catastrophe of Jena. He accompanied the fugitive government to Königsberg, where he rendered considerable service in the commissariat, and was afterwards still more useful as commissioner of the national debt and by his opposition to ill-considered schemes of taxation. He was also for a short time Prussian minister in the Netherlands, where he endeavoured without success to fund a loan. The extreme sensitiveness of his temperament, however, disqualified him for politics; he proved impracticable in his relations with Hardenberg and other ministers, and in 1810 retired for a time from public life, accepting the more congenial appointment of royal historiographer and professor at the university of Berlin.

In 1809 he became a third class corresponding member, living abroad, of the Royal Institute of the Netherlands.

== Academic and diplomatic career ==
He commenced his lectures with a course on the history of Rome, which formed the basis of his great work Römische Geschichte. The first edition in two volumes, based upon his lectures, was published in 1811–1812, but attracted little attention at the time owing to the absorbing interest of political events. In 1813 Niebuhr's own attention was diverted from history by the uprising of the German people against Napoleon; he entered the Landwehr and ineffectually sought admission into the regular army. He edited for a short time a patriotic journal, the Prussian Correspondent, joined the headquarters of the allied sovereigns, and witnessed the battle of Bautzen, and was subsequently employed in some minor negotiations. In 1815 he lost both his father and his wife.

He next accepted (1816) the post of ambassador at Rome. Before his departure for Rome, he married his wife's niece. On his way to Rome, he discovered in the cathedral library of Verona the long-lost Institutes of Gaius, afterwards edited by Savigny, to whom he communicated the discovery under the impression that he had found a portion of Ulpian. The reason that Niebuhr visited Verona is a matter of controversy among scholars, with some alleging that he was on a "secret mission" to obtain the Gaius manuscript which others had previously found. The evidence points towards a fortunate coincidence.

During his residence in Rome Niebuhr discovered and published fragments of Cicero and Livy, aided Cardinal Mai in his edition of Cicero's De re publica, and shared in framing the plan of the great work Beschreibung Roms ("The Description of the City of Rome") on the topography of ancient Rome by Christian Charles Josias Bunsen and Ernst Zacharias Platner (1773–1855), to which he contributed several chapters. He also, on a journey home from Italy, deciphered in a palimpsest at the Abbey of St. Gall the fragments of Flavius Merobaudes, a Roman poet of the 5th century. As minister, he brought about the understanding between Prussia and Pope Pius VII signalized by the papal bull De salute animarum in 1821. Niebuhr was elected a Foreign Honorary Member of the American Academy of Arts and Sciences in 1822.

In 1823 he resigned the position in Rome and established himself at Bonn, where the remainder of his life was spent, with the exception of some visits to Berlin as councillor of state. He here rewrote and republished (1827–1828) the first two volumes of his Roman History, and composed a third volume, bringing the narrative down to the end of the First Punic War, which, with the help of a fragment written in 1831, was edited after his death (1832) by Johannes Classen. He also assisted in August Bekker's edition of the Byzantine historians (the Corpus Scriptorum Historiae Byzantinae), and delivered courses of lectures on ancient history, ethnography, geography, and on the French Revolution.

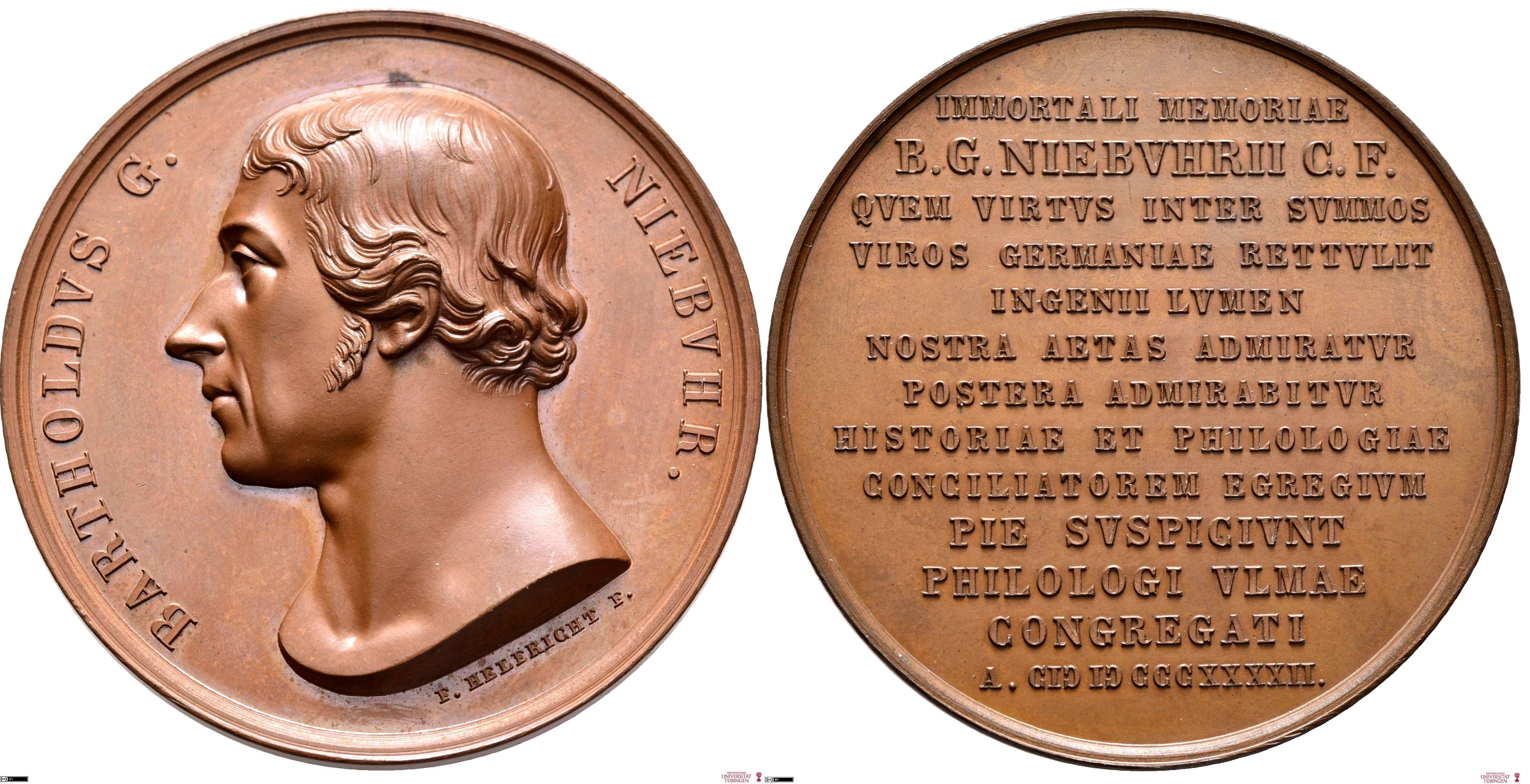
Medaille Barthold Georg Niebuhr 1842

In February 1830, his house was burned down, but the greater part of his books and manuscripts were saved. France's revolution of July in the same year was a terrible blow to him, and filled him with the most dismal anticipations of the future of Europe. Niebuhr died, aged 54, in Bonn. After his death, in 1842, a medal was commissioned to honour his work.

== Evaluation and opinion ==
Niebuhr's Roman History counts among epoch-making histories both as marking an era in the study of its special subject and for its momentous influence on the general conception of history. Leonhard Schmitz, in his 1861 preface to the English version of Mommsen's History, wrote:

"The main results arrived at by the inquiries of Niebuhr, such as his views of the ancient population of Rome, the origin of the plebs, the relation between the patricians and plebeians, the real nature of the ager publicus, and many other points of interest, have been acknowledged by all his successors."

The Encyclopedia Britannica (1911) continues, "Other alleged discoveries, such as the construction of early Roman history out of still earlier ballads, have not been equally fortunate; but if every positive conclusion of Niebuhr's had been refuted, his claim to be considered the first who dealt with the ancient history of Rome in a scientific spirit would remain unimpaired, and the new principles introduced by him into historical research would lose nothing of their importance. He suggested, though he did not elaborate, the theory of the myth, so potent an instrument for good and ill in modern historical criticism. He brought in inference to supply the place of discredited tradition, and showed the possibility of writing history in the absence of original records. By his theory of the disputes between the patricians and plebeians arising from original differences of race he drew attention to the immense importance of ethnological distinctions, and contributed to the revival of these divergences as factors in modern history. More than all, perhaps, since his conception of ancient Roman story made laws and manners of more account than shadowy lawgivers, he undesignedly influenced history by popularizing that conception of it which lays stress on institutions, tendencies and social traits to the neglect of individuals."

More modern perspectives on Niebuhr's work maintain that, although some of his hypotheses were extravagant, and his conclusions mistaken, he introduced a constructive, scientific approach to the critical and sceptical consideration of ancient literary sources, especially with regard to their poetic and mythical embellishments. The influence of scientific racism upon some of his theories has been considered.

== Works ==
The first edition of Niebuhr's Roman History was translated into English by F. A. Walter (1827), but was immediately superseded by the translation of the second edition by Julius Hare and Connop Thirlwall, completed by William Smith and Leonhard Schmitz (last edition, 1847–1851). He wrote Griechische Heroengeschichte (“History of Greek Heroes,” 1842; 11th ed. 1896), for his son Marcus; Geschichte des Zeitalters der Revolution (“History of the Age of Revolutions”, 1845); Kleine historische und philologische Schriften (Minor Historical and Philological Writings, 1828–43). His Lectures on Ancient History is familiar in English translation.
