= Nicolas-Didier Boguet =

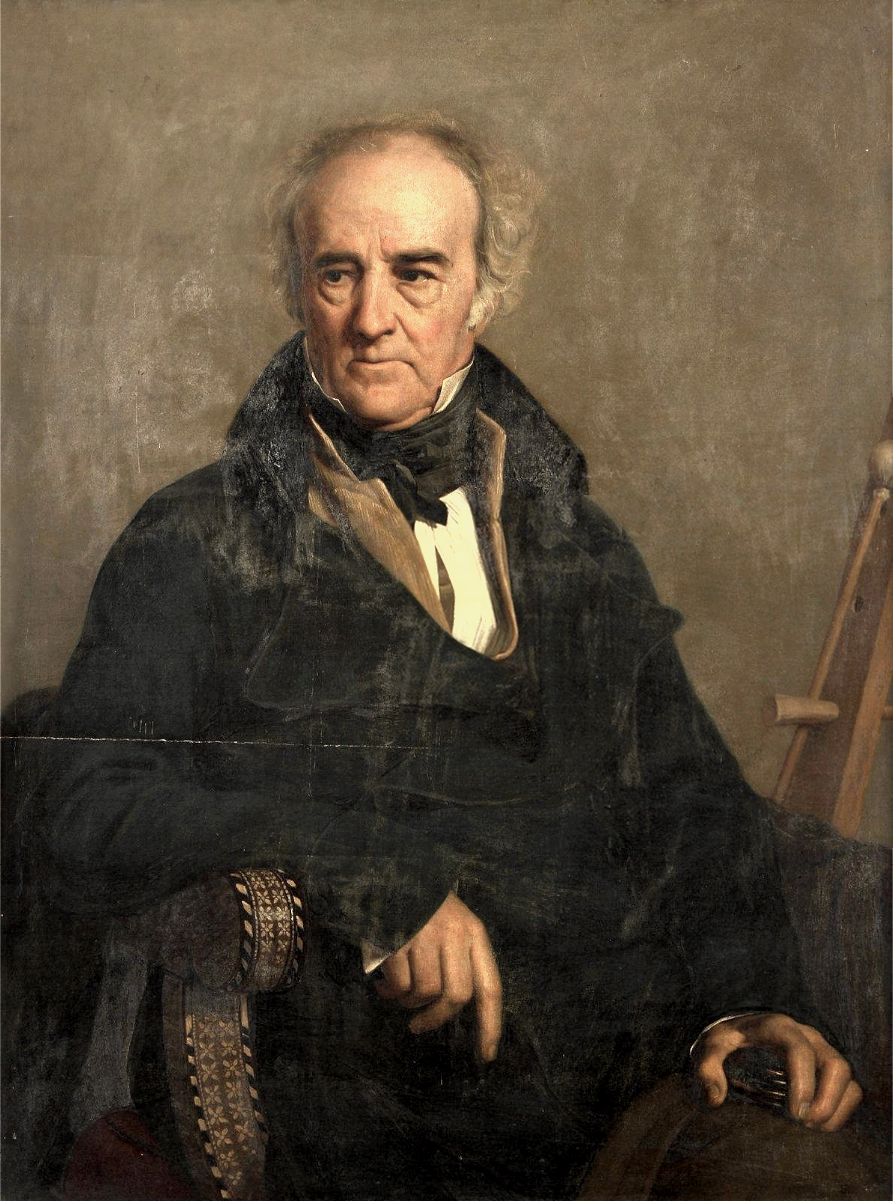
Nicolas-Didier Boguet (1755-1839)

Nicolas-Didier Boguet (18 February 1755 in Chantilly, Oise – 1 April 1839 in Rome) was a French landscape painter. He spent his adult life in Rome.

Boguet was sent to Paris at age 23 as a protégé of the Prince of Condé. After being recommended by Augustin Pajou, Boguet was admitted to the Academy in order to study art history. He traveled to Rome in 1783, and began concentrating on landscape painting. He spent his summers traveling and painting in the Italian countryside, producing hundreds of paintings.

== Artistic output ==
Boguet is primarily noted for his outdoor landscapes, but also produced portraits and scenes which included people.

There are examples of his work in the galleries of Versailles, Aix, and Montpellier.

Near the end of the eighteenth century, Boguet obtained commissions from several European aristocrats to produce Italian landscapes. For Frederick Hervey, 4th Earl of Bristol, he produced A View of Lake Albano (1795). In 1796 he was introduced to Napoleon, who induced him to produce illustrations of Napoleon's campaigns on the Italian peninsula. One notable result of this work is Boguet's Battle of Castiglione.

== Representations ==
A marble bust of Boguet was rendered by Jean-Jacques Feuchère. It is in the Musée des beaux-arts in Angers, France.

An oil portrait of Boguet was rendered by an anonymous painter; it is held in the collection of the Accademia di San Luca in Rome.
