= Johann Martin von Rohden =

German painter (1778–1868)

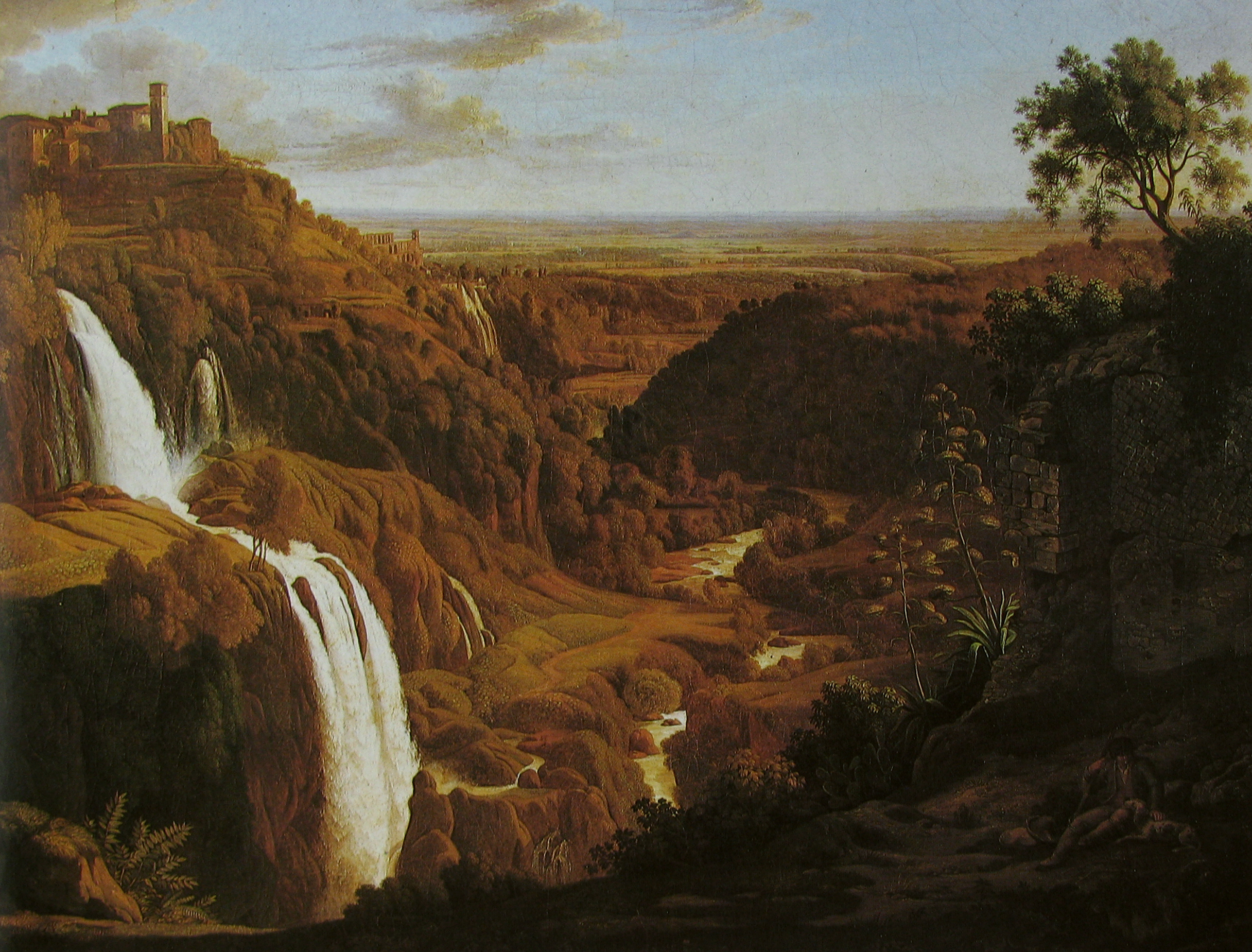
Waterfall near Tivoli, 1819, in the Museum der bildenden Künste, Leipzig

Johann Martin von Rohden (b Kassel, 30 July 1778; d Rome, 9 September 1868) was a German painter active for most of his career in Rome.

== Life and work ==
Son of a merchant, von Rohden began his studies at the Kunstakademie in Kassel, remaining there until 1795. At seventeen he went to Rome with a friend who had won a travel grant for artists from the Landgrave of Hesse. There he met and studied with Johann Christian Reinhart. In 1799 he left Rome and traveled up the Italian coast; he was back in Germany from 1801 until 1802. In the latter year he returned to Rome to study with Joseph Anton Koch; he remained in or near the city for the duration of his time in Italy, save for a trip in 1805 to Sicily.

He returned to Germany in 1811, visiting Goethe in Weimar and joining a Kassel-based reading group run by the brothers Grimm, but returned the following year to Rome, staying until 1826. He converted to Roman Catholicism and married the daughter of the innkeeper of the Sibylla Inn in Tivoli. With Johann Georg von Dillis he was apparently the first German painter to paint outdoors as part of his work. Though he was older, this practice earned him respect from the younger generation of German landscape painters who came to Rome to work in the early nineteenth century.

In 1826 he was offered the post of chief painter at the court of Hesse, but the relocation was hard on his family, and two years later he was granted permission to return to Rome for good. There he was known as kind and sociable, helping to form the German Academy and frequently going for hunting trips in the Campagna. He died in Rome in 1868.
