= Frances Bunsen =

Welsh painter, author and diplomatic hostess (1791–1876)

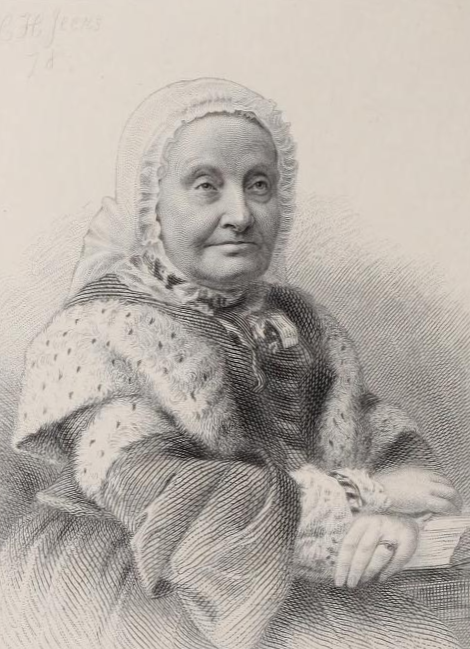
Frances Bunsen, 1874

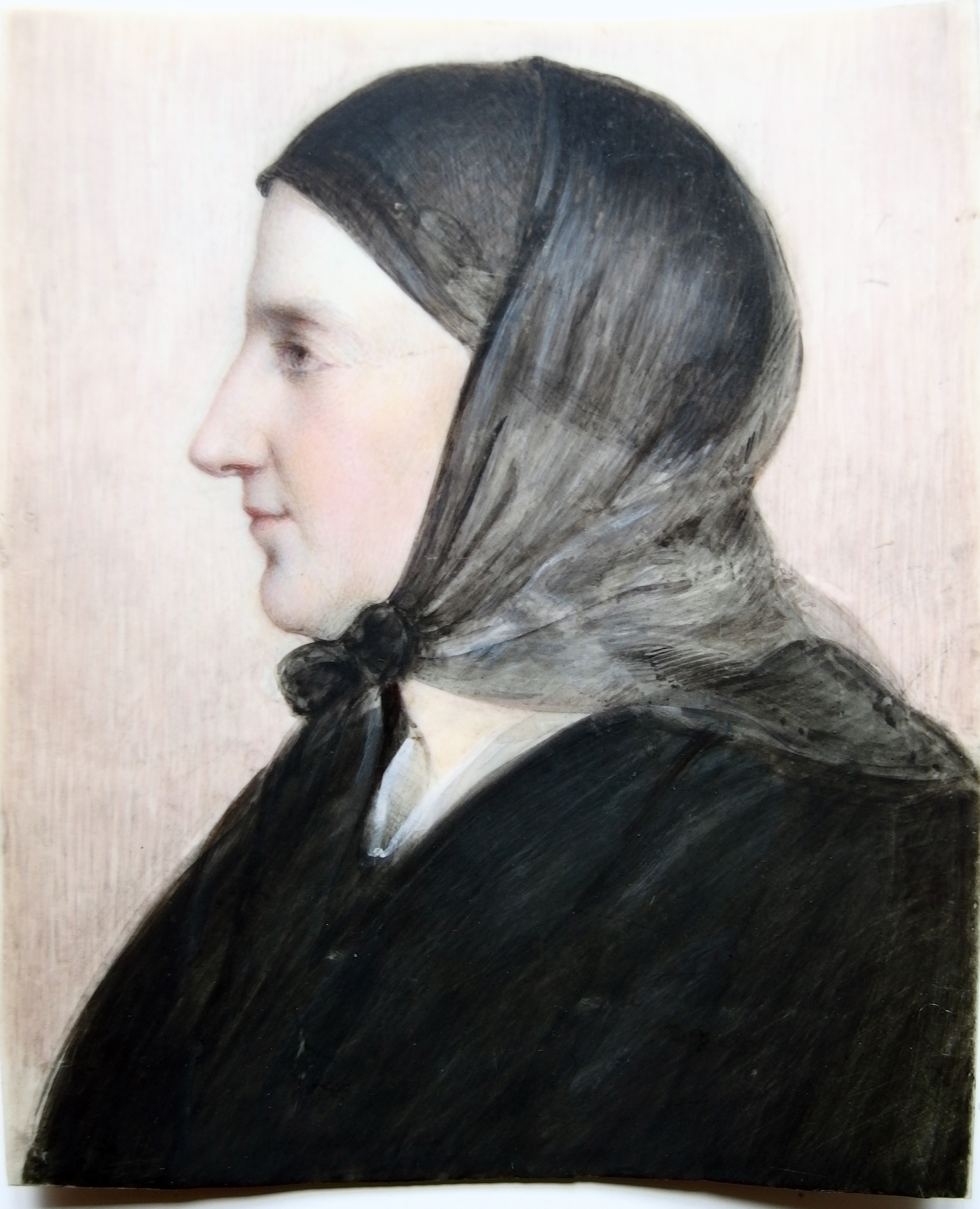
Mrs. Waddington, mother of Frances Bunsen, mother-in-law of Christian Charles Josias von Bunsen, Painting on ivory by August Grahl, 1831

Baroness Frances Waddington Bunsen (4 March 1791 – 23 April 1876) was a Welsh painter, author and diplomatic hostess, wife of Christian Charles Josias Bunsen, and the older sister of Lady Llanover.

== Early life ==
Frances Waddington was born in 1791 at Dunston Park in Berkshire, one of the five daughters of landowner Benjamin Waddington (d.1828) and Georgina Mary Ann, (née Port) (1771–1850), the eldest daughter and co-heiress of her father. Her younger sister Augusta Waddington became Lady Llanover on marriage to Benjamin Hall, 1st Baron Llanover. Frances' mother Georgina was a great niece of Mary Delany, a bluestocking and botanical artist. Frances later lived at "Tŷ Uchaf", Llanover, Monmouthshire where she and her sister were educated by her mother.

Frances was a talented watercolour painter. Several of her pictures are owned by Newport City Council.

== Marriage ==
In 1816, the Waddington family spent the winter in Rome and Benjamin Waddington struck up a friendship with Christian Charles Josias Bunsen, a young Prussian diplomat who was involved in the cultural life of the city, and introduced him to his family.

On 1 July 1817 Frances Waddington married Baron Bunsen in the chapel of the Palazzo Savelli, home of his friend and mentor Barthold Georg Niebuhr. Frances didn't return to Britain for 21 years after her marriage. The couple had ten children, five sons and five daughters, including the biblical scholar Ernest Christian Ludwig de Bunsen. Frances' British connections proved invaluable to the success of her husband's career.

In 1823 her husband succeeded Niebuhr as Prussian minister to the Vatican and the couple remained in Rome until 1838, living in the Palazzo Caffarelli on the Capitol. Their home became a meeting place for artists and intellectuals.

The Bunsen family's first visit to Britain lasted from August 1838 to October 1839 when Christian Bunsen was appointed ambassador to Switzerland, where the family stayed until the spring of 1841. Bunsen was then appointed Prussian ambassador to the court of St James in 1842, serving in this role until 1854. As in Rome, Frances von Bunsen was active in supporting her husband's career, hosting many guests from a wide social and cultural network at their home in Carlton Terrace in London.

After her husband's death in 1860, she published a memoir of his life: A Memoir of Baron Bunsen, Drawn Chiefly from Family Papers, by His Widow, Frances, Baroness Bunsen (1868).

She moved to Karlsruhe, Baden-Württemberg, Germany where she looked after the children of her late daughter Theodora, Baroness von Ungern Sternberg. She travelled to visit friends and family across Europe, and was an avid correspondent.

Frances von Bunsen, Baroness von Bunsen died in Waldhorn Strasse, Karlsruhe on 23 April 1876, in the presence of many of her children and grandchildren, and was buried next to her husband in Bonn.

== Works ==
=== Paintings ===
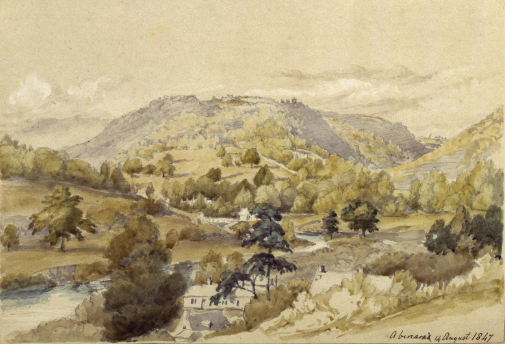
Abercarn by Frances Bunsen, 1847

- Swansea (1808)
- Hills beyond Crickhowell (1808)
- Monmouth (1810)
- Basaleg Church (1813)
- Tredegar Park (1813)
- Abergavenny Church (1838)
- Abercarn (1847)

=== Writings ===
- Memoir of Baron Bunsen (1868)
- Hare, Life and Letters of Frances, Baroness Bunsen (London, 1882)
