= Constantinople Agreement =

Triple Entente agreement re potential partition of the Ottoman Empire

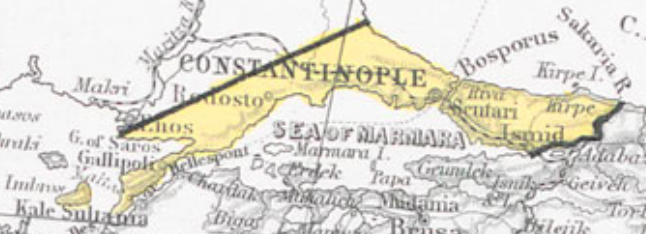
Extract from a January 1919 British Foreign Office memorandum summarizing the wartime agreements regarding the Ottoman Empire - the Constantinople Agreement area ceded to Russia appears in yellow.

The Constantinople Agreement (also known as the Straits Agreement) resulted from a secret exchange of diplomatic correspondence between members of the Triple Entente from 4 March to 10 April 1915 during World War I. In the event of an Entente victory, France and Great Britain promised to give Constantinople and the Dardanelles (at the time part of the Ottoman Empire) to the Russian Empire. Britain and France put forward their own claims: to an increased sphere of influence in Persia (present-day Iran) for Britain, and to the annexation of Syria (including Palestine) and Cilicia for France. The three Triple Entente powers also agreed that the Holy Places and Arabia would come under independent Muslim rule. The Greek government remained technically neutral in the war until June 1917, but in 1915 it negotiated with the Allies, offering soldiers and (especially) a geographical launching-point for attacks on the Turkish Straits. Greece itself wanted control of Constantinople, but Russia vetoed the Greek proposal, because its own main war-goal was to control the Straits and to take control of Constantinople.

Though the Anglo-French attempt to seize the area in the Gallipoli Campaign of 1915 to 1916 failed, the Allies, eventually victorious, nevertheless occupied Constantinople after the end of World War I in November 1918. By that time, however, the October Revolution of 1917 had brought about Russian withdrawal from the war, and as Russia was no longer one of the Allied Powers the agreement was not implemented. The Bolshevik government had published the text of the Constantinople Agreement in accordance with the Soviet move against the practice of secret diplomacy propounded in the Decree on Peace of 8 November [O.S. 26 October] 1917.

== Historical background ==
Bosporus Strait Dardanelles Strait

In the 19th century diplomatic agreements regulated the use of the Turkish Straits:

- the 1841 London Straits Convention stipulating the closure of the straits to warships
- following the Crimean War, the Treaty of Paris (1856), universalising the principle of commercial freedom at the same time as forbidding any militarization in and around the Black Sea
- later amendments in the Treaty of London (1871); reaffirmed in the Treaty of Berlin (1878).

In early 1907, in the talks leading up to the Anglo-Russian Convention, Count Alexander Izvolsky, then Russian Minister of Foreign Affairs, raised the question of the Straits, and talks took place in London with the Russian ambassador, Count Alexander Benckendorff. Details remain sketchy, but the "suggestion appears to have been made that Russia should have free egress from the Black Sea through the Straits, while other powers should have the right to send their vessels of war into the Straits without going into the Black Sea" together with some talk of "Russia's occupying the Bosphorus and England the Dardanelles, after which the Straits might be opened to other warships as well." In the event, nothing changed in the Straits at the time.

On 12 October 1908, the Russian Ambassador to France, Aleksandr Nelidov, in a conversation with the British Ambassador to France, Lord Bertie, said that since Japan would not allow Russia to keep a Pacific fleet, and since the Baltic was practically closed throughout the winter, it was essential for Russia that the Black Sea should be made "the home for the Russian fleet whence she can move to the Mediterranean, the Baltic and the Far East as necessity may require".

Alexander Izvolsky, the Russian Foreign Minister, in the latter part of 1908 was able to get conditional support for a change in the Straits régime from the Austro-Hungarian Foreign Minister Alois Lexa von Aehrenthal, the Italian Minister of Foreign Affairs Tommaso Tittoni and the German Ambassador to Paris, Wilhelm von Schoen as well as from the British Secretary of State for Foreign Affairs Sir Edward Grey, Grey on 14 October 1908 being clearest on the subject while indicating that Turkish agreement was a prerequisite.

During the Bosnian Crisis of 1908, in the Italo-Turkish War of 1911 to 1912, as well as during the Balkan Wars of 1912 to 1913, Russia made attempts to obtain the opening of the straits for Russian warships, but failed for want of support from other Great powers. In April/May 1912 the Turks closed the straits for some weeks, and in response to subsequent threats of closure Russia indicated that it would take action in the event of a prolonged closure.

At the outbreak of World War I in 1914, the Ottoman Empire was diplomatically isolated; it had sought alliances with Britain at the end of 1911, with France and Russia between May and July 1914, and with Germany on 22 July 1914, (Note: A secret alliance was concluded between the Ottoman Empire and the German Empire on August 2, 1914.) to no avail. Russia was concerned about the potential arrival in the Black Sea of two modern warships being built by British shipyards for the Ottoman Navy: the Sultân Osmân-ı Evvel, which had been completed and was making preparations to leave, and the Reşadiye. On 30 July, Russian Minister of Foreign Affairs Sergey Sazonov instructed Benckendorff: (Note: Sazonov had made a similar request earlier in June but had been refused on the grounds that the government could not intervene in a commercial matter.)

it is a matter of the highest importance for us that Turkey should not receive the two dreadnoughts..point out to the English government the immense importance of this matter for us, and energetically insist upon the retention of these two ships in England."

The British First Lord of the Admiralty, Winston Churchill, had by then already decided on requisition, and when the Turkish ambassador protested on 1 August, he was informed that "in view of the serious situation abroad it was not possible to allow a battleship to leave these waters and pass into the hands of a foreign buyer".

The unsuccessful pursuit of the two German warships Goeben and Breslau by the British Royal Navy led to Goeben and Breslau being allowed to enter the Dardanelles on 10 August 1914. (Note: On 6 August 1914, at 0100 hours, Grand Vizier Said Halim summoned the German ambassador, Hans Freiherr von Wangenheim, to his office to inform him that the Cabinet had decided "unanimously" to open the Straits to Goeben and Breslau.)

== Details ==
Historian Dmitrii Likharev, analysing key contributions in the historiography of the subject points to contributions of C. Jay Smith who obtained access to the Asquith papers in the 1960s and to William Renzi in 1970 who made use of records released by the British National Archives to date Britain's promise of Constantinople to the Russians to November 1914 (Note: "This affirmation was repeated in a memorandum dated November 14 which Buchanan delivered to the Russian Foreign Office. Again, Grey made the promised contingent on Germany's defeat.") and its genesis to earlier in September (Note: "This early [September 23], then, the inexorable logic of events clearly suggested an arrangement with Russia regarding Constantinople and the Straits."), prior to the Ottoman entry into the war.

From 4 March to 10 April 1915, the Triple Entente of Britain, France, and Russia secretly discussed how to divide up the lands of the Ottoman Empire. Britain was to control an even larger zone in Persia, while Russia would get the Ottoman capital, Constantinople. The Dardanelles were also promised to Russia. The language of the agreement described the following boundaries:

...the city of Constantinople, the western bank of the Bosphorus, of the Sea of Marmara and of the Dardanelles, as well as southern Thrace to the Enez-Midye line... and... that part of the Asiatic shore that lies between the Bosphorus, the Sakarya River and a point to be determined on the Gulf of Izmit, and the islands of the Sea of Marmara, the Imbros and Tenedos islands.

The British and the French sought to limit Russian claims, but were not able to do so, and also had to contend with the possibility that Russia might make a separate peace with the Central Powers. The agreement was one of a series of agreements regarding the partition of the Ottoman Empire by the Triple Entente and Italy following the war, including the Treaty of London (1915), the Sykes–Picot Agreement (1916) and the Agreement of Saint-Jean-de-Maurienne (April to August 1917). The British Gallipoli Campaign (1915–16) was aimed at seizing the Dardanelles and Constantinople, but was defeated by the Ottomans, and the Allies did not gain control of the region until occupying it in November 1918, after the end of the war. By that time, the Communist Bolsheviks had seized power in Russia during the October Revolution of 1917 and had signed a separate peace with the Central Powers in March 1918, dropping out of the war. As the Allies therefore no longer considered Russia among their number, and, indeed, did not even recognize the legitimacy of the Bolshevik government, the agreement was never implemented.

== See also ==
- Diplomatic history of World War I
- Occupation of Constantinople

== Bibliography ==
- Fitzgerald, Edward Peter (1994). "France's Middle Eastern Ambitions, the Sykes-Picot Negotiations, and the Oil Fields of Mosul, 1915-1918". The Journal of Modern History. 66 (4): 697–725. doi:10.1086/244937. ISSN 0022-2801. JSTOR 2125155.
- Fromkin, David (2001). A peace to end all peace: the fall of the Ottoman Empire and the creation of the modern Middle East (1. Owl Books ed.). New York: Henry Holt & Company, Incorporated. ISBN 0-8050-6884-8. OCLC 53814831.
- Helmreich, Paul C. (1976). "Italy and the Anglo-French Repudiation of the 1917 St. Jean de Maurienne Agreement". The Journal of Modern History. 48 (2): 99–139. doi:10.1086/241525. ISSN 0022-2801. JSTOR 1877819.
- Pınar Üre: Constantinople Agreement, in: 1914-1918-online. International Encyclopedia of the First World War.
- Hamilton, Richard F.; Herwig, Holger H. (2005). Decisions for War,1914–1917. Cambridge: Cambridge University Press. ISBN 978-0-51119-678-2.
- Renzi, William A. (March 1970). "Great Britain, Russia, and the Straits, 1914–1915". The Journal of Modern History. 42 (1): 2–20. doi:10.1086/240513. JSTOR 1905979. S2CID 144998651.
- Bobroff, Ronald (24 February 2006). Roads to Glory: Late Imperial Russia and the Turkish Straits. I.B.Tauris. ISBN 978-1-84511-142-7.
- Smith, C.Jay (July 1965). "Great Britain and the 1914–1915 Straits Agreement with Russia: The British Promise of November 1914". American Historical Review. 70 (4): 1015–1034. doi:10.2307/1846901. JSTOR 1846901.
- Macfie, A.L. (1981). "The Straits Question,1908–1914". Political Science Quarterly. 22 (2): 321–332.
- Macfie, A.L. (6 December 2006). "The straits question in the First World War, 1914–18". Middle Eastern Studies. 19 (1): 43–74. doi:10.1080/00263208308700533. JSTOR 1905979.
- Macfie, A.L (1998). The end of the Ottoman Empire, 1908–1923. Longman. ISBN 978-0-582-28763-1.
- Langer, William L. (January 1929). "Russia, the Straits Question, and the European Powers, 1904-8". The English Historical Review. 44 (173): 59–85. doi:10.1093/ehr/XLIV.CLXXIII.59. JSTOR 552495.
- Langer, William L. (September 1928). "Russia, the Straits Question and the Origins of the Balkan League, 1908–1912". Political Science Quarterly. 43 (3): 321–363. doi:10.2307/2142971. JSTOR 2142971.
- Kerner, Robert J. (September 1929). "Russia, the Straits, and Constantinople, 1914-15". The Journal of Modern History. 1 (3): 400–415. doi:10.1086/235488. JSTOR 1871427. S2CID 143987882.
- Hurewitz, J.C. (July 1962). "Russia and the Turkish Straits: A Revaluation of the Origins of the Problem". World Politics. 14 (4): 605–632. doi:10.2307/2009311. JSTOR 2009311. S2CID 154130755.
- Yıldız, Gültekin (July 1962). "How to Defend the Turkish Straits Against the Russians: A century-long 'Eastern Question' in British defence planning, 1815–1914". The Mariner's Mirror. 105 (1): 40–59. doi:10.1080/00253359.2019.1565339. S2CID 159387741.
- Likharev, Dmitrii V. (June 11, 2019). "Constantinople and the Black Sea straits as Russia's war aims in 1914–1917: A comparison of Russian and American interpretations". The Historian. 81 (2): 260–281. doi:10.1111/hisn.13134. S2CID 197703133.
