= Sykes–Picot Agreement =

Secret 1916 agreement between the United Kingdom and France

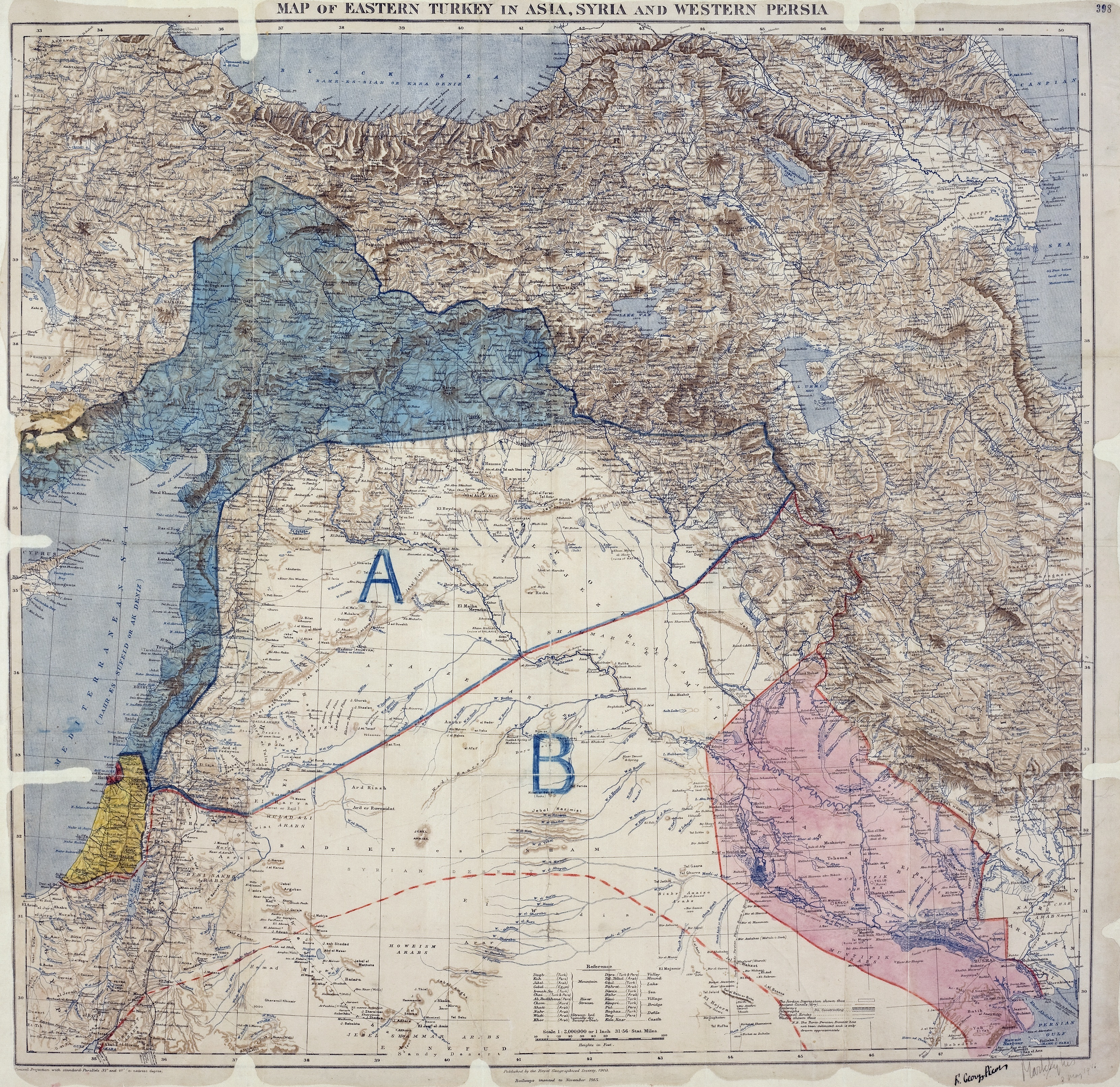
- Map signed by Sykes and Picot, enclosed in Cambon's 9 May 1916 letter to Grey

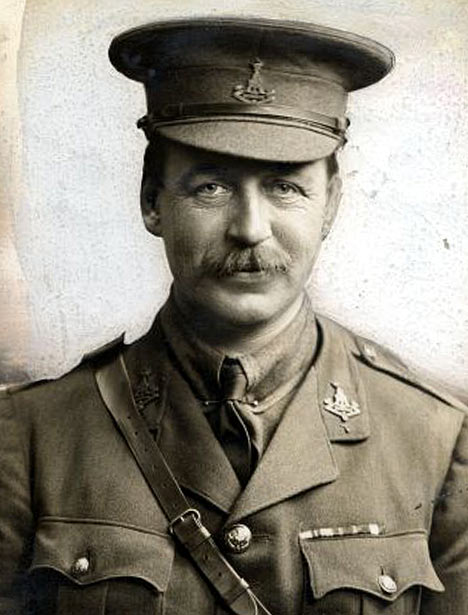
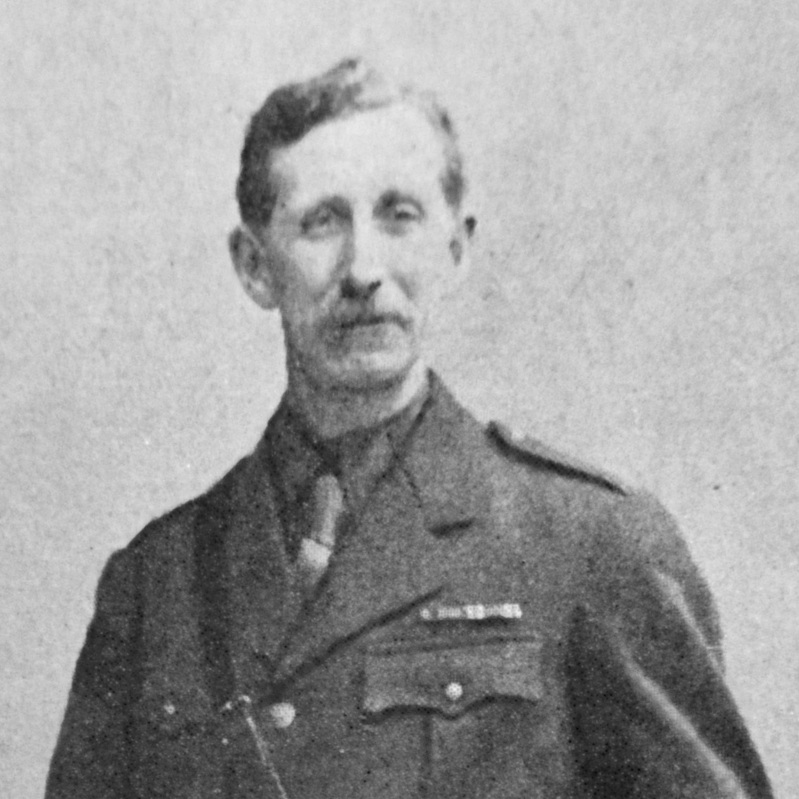
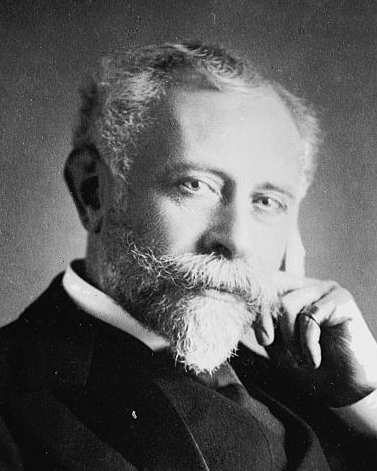
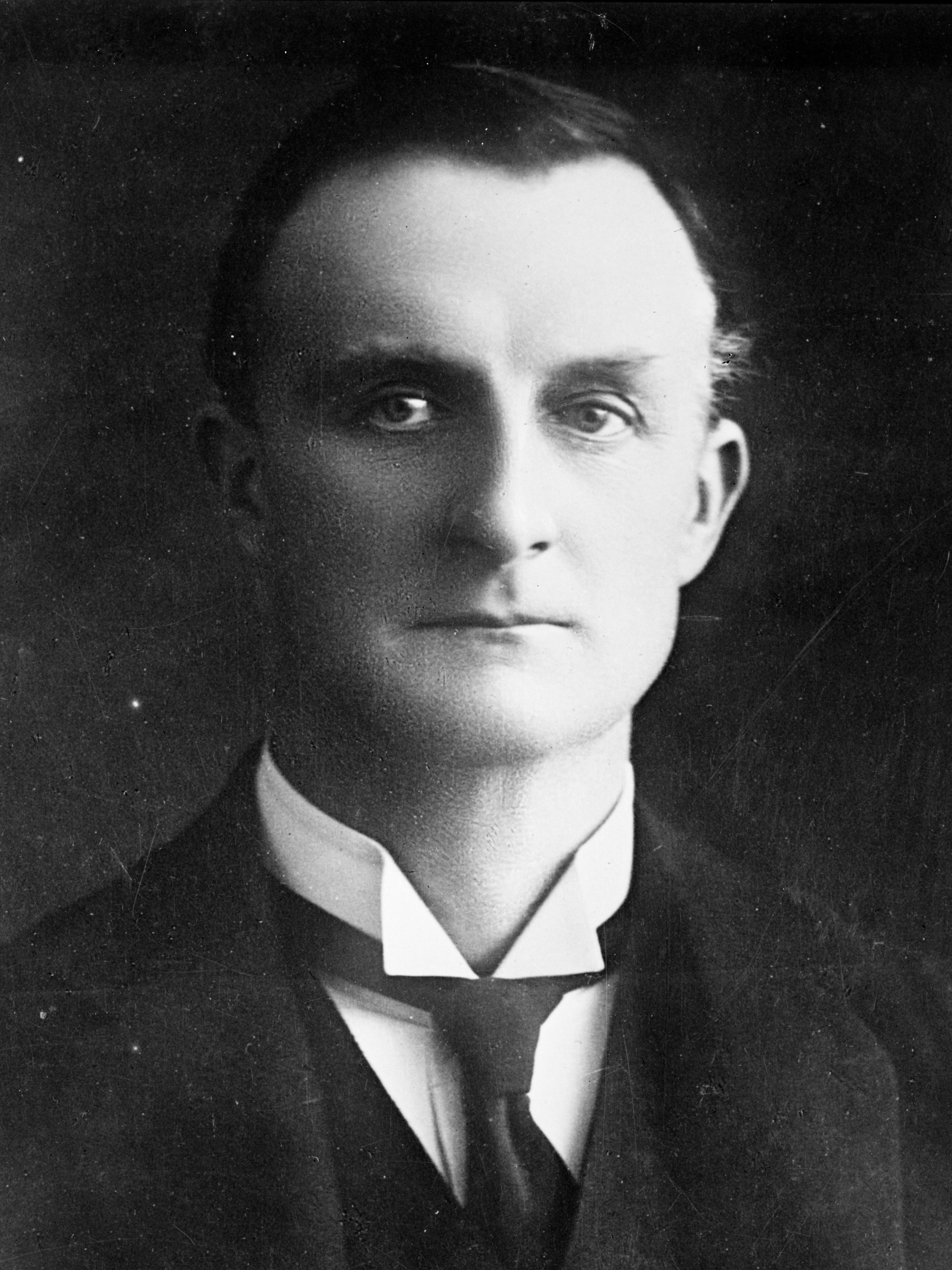
- Top: Mark Sykes and François Georges-Picot; Bottom: Paul Cambon and Edward Grey
- Created: 3 January 1916
- Presented: 23 November 1917 by the Russian Bolshevik government
- Ratified: 9–16 May 1916
- Authors: (United Kingdom of Great Britain and Ireland) Mark Sykes; (French Third Republic) François Georges-Picot
- Signatories: (United Kingdom of Great Britain and Ireland) Edward Grey; (French Third Republic) Paul Cambon
- Purpose: Defining proposed spheres of influence and control in the Middle East should the Triple Entente succeed in defeating the Ottoman Empire

Full text
- The Sykes–Picot Agreement at Wikisource

The Sykes–Picot Agreement (/ˈsaɪks ˈpiːkoʊ, - pɪˈkoʊ, - piːˈkoʊ/) was a 1916 secret treaty between the United Kingdom and France, with assent from Russia and Italy, to define their mutually agreed spheres of influence and control in an eventual partition of the Ottoman Empire.

The agreement was based on the premise that the Triple Entente would achieve success in defeating the Ottoman Empire during World War I and formed part of a series of secret agreements contemplating its partition. The primary negotiations leading to the agreement took place between 23 November 1915 and 3 January 1916, on which date the British and French diplomats, Mark Sykes and François Georges-Picot, initialled an agreed memorandum. The agreement was ratified by their respective governments on 9 and 16 May 1916.

The agreement effectively divided the Ottoman provinces outside the Arabian Peninsula into areas of British and French control and influence. The British- and French-controlled countries were divided by the Sykes–Picot line. The agreement allocated to the UK control of what is today southern Israel, Jordan and southern Iraq, and an additional small area that included the ports of Haifa and Acre to allow access to the Mediterranean. France was to control southeastern Turkey, the Kurdistan Region, Syria and Lebanon.

As a result of the included Sazonov–Paléologue Agreement, Russia was to get Western Armenia in addition to Constantinople and the Turkish Straits already promised under the 1915 Constantinople Agreement. Italy assented to the agreement in 1917 via the Agreement of Saint-Jean-de-Maurienne and received southern Anatolia. The Palestine region, with a smaller area than the later Mandatory Palestine, was to fall under an "international administration".

The agreement was initially used directly as the basis for the 1918 Anglo–French Modus Vivendi, which provided a framework for the Occupied Enemy Territory Administration in the Levant. More broadly it was to lead, indirectly, to the subsequent partitioning of the Ottoman Empire following Ottoman defeat in 1918. Shortly after the war, the French ceded Palestine and Mosul to the British. Mandates in the Levant and Mesopotamia were assigned at the April 1920 San Remo conference following the Sykes–Picot framework; the British Mandate for Palestine ran until 1948, the British Mandate for Mesopotamia was to be replaced by a similar treaty with Mandatory Iraq, and the French Mandate for Syria and the Lebanon lasted until 1946. The Anatolian parts of the agreement were assigned by the August 1920 Treaty of Sèvres; however, these ambitions were thwarted by the 1919–1923 Turkish War of Independence and the subsequent Treaty of Lausanne.

The agreement is seen by many as a turning point in Western and Arab relations. Arabs saw it as the failure to keep a British promise in the McMahon–Hussein correspondence with Hussein bin Ali, King of Hejaz regarding a national Arab homeland in exchange for supporting the British against the Ottoman Empire. The British later claimed that Palestine was meant to be excluded from the area of Arab rule, as it is technically located west of Damascus: for obvious reasons the Zionists took the same position. The Arabs interpreted the letter as it reads: Lebanon, not Palestine, is to the west of Damascus and the other areas mentioned. The agreement, along with others, was made public by the Bolsheviks in Moscow on 23 November 1917 and repeated in The Manchester Guardian on 26 November 1917, such that "the British were embarrassed, the Arabs dismayed and the Turks delighted". The agreement's legacy has led to much resentment in the region, among Arabs in particular but also among Kurds who were denied an independent state.

== Motivation and negotiations ==
=== Earlier agreements with Russia and Italy (March–April 1915) ===
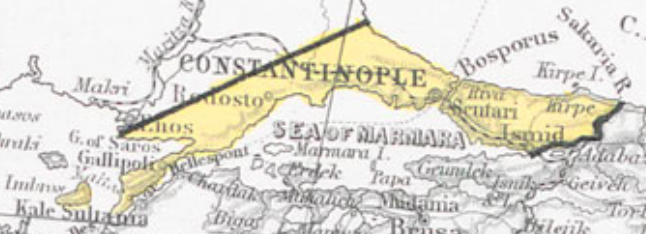
Area allotted to Russia in the Constantinople Agreement on 18 March 1915

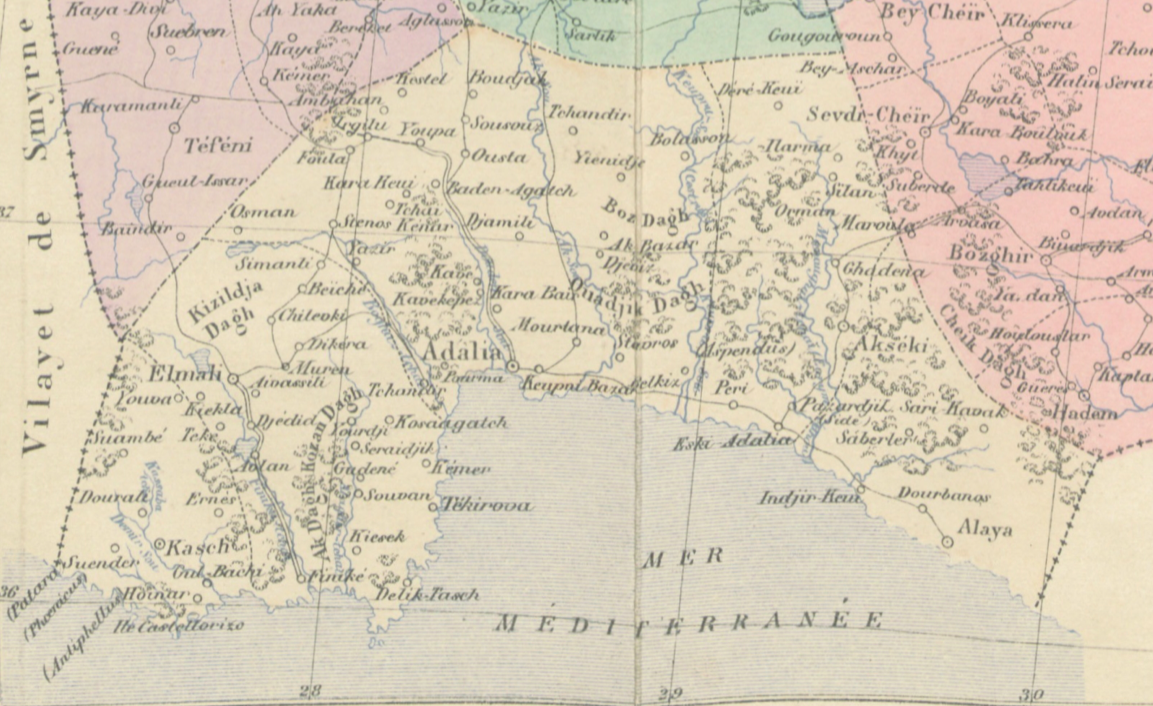
Area allotted to Italy in the Treaty of London on 26 April 1915

In the Constantinople Agreement of 18 March 1915, following the start of naval operations in the run up to the Gallipoli campaign the Russian Foreign Minister, Sergey Sazonov, wrote to the French and UK ambassadors and staked a claim to Constantinople and the Dardanelles. In a series of diplomatic exchanges over five weeks, the UK and France both agreed, while putting forward their own claims, to an increased sphere of influence in Iran in the case of the UK and to an annexation of Syria (including Palestine) and Cilicia for France. The UK and French claims were both agreed, all sides also agreeing that the exact governance of the Holy Places was to be left for later settlement. Were it not for the Russian Revolutions of 1917, Constantinople and the Straits could have been given to Russia upon the Allied victory. This agreement and the Sykes–Picot Agreement were complementary, as France and Britain first had to satisfy Russia in order to finalize the partitioning of the Middle East.

In the Treaty of London of 26 April 1915, Article 9 included commitments regarding Italian participation in any partitioning of the Ottoman Empire. The article stated: "If France, Great Britain and Russia occupy any territories in Turkey in Asia during the course of the war, the Mediterranean region bordering on the Province of Adalia within the limits indicated above shall be reserved to Italy, who shall be entitled to occupy it."

=== Earlier agreement with the Arabs (July 1915 – March 1916) ===
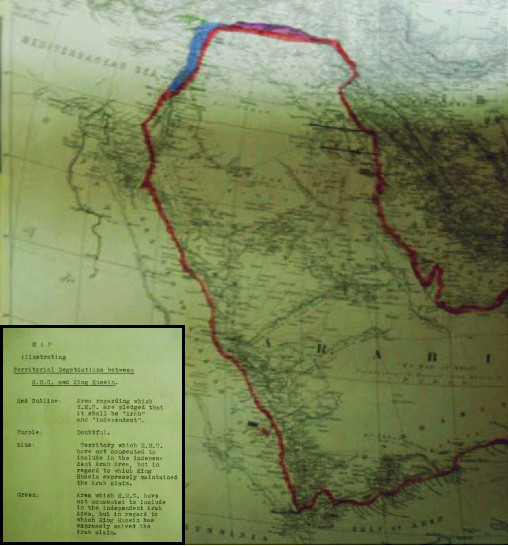
1918 British government map: Map illustrating Territorial Negotiations between H.M.G. and King Hussein

While Sykes and Picot were in negotiations, discussions were proceeding in parallel between Hussein bin Ali, Sharif of Mecca, and Lieutenant Colonel Sir Henry McMahon, British High Commissioner to Egypt (the McMahon–Hussein Correspondence). Their correspondence comprised ten letters exchanged from July 1915 to March 1916, in which the British government agreed to recognize Arab independence after the war in exchange for the Sharif of Mecca launching the Arab Revolt against the Ottoman Empire.

The area of Arab independence was defined to be "bounded on the North by Mersina and Adana up to 37 degrees of latitude, on which degree fall Birijik, Urfa, Mardin, Midiat, Jerizat (Ibn ʿUma), Amadia, up to the border of Persia; on the east by the borders of Persia up to the Gulf of Basra; on the South by the Indian Ocean, with the exception of the position of Aden to remain as it is; on the west by the Red Sea, the Mediterranean Sea up to Mersina", with the exception of "portions of Syria" lying to the west of "the districts of Damascus, Homs, Hama and Aleppo".

Hussein's reply of 1 January to McMahon's 14 December 1915 was received at the Foreign Office, McMahon's cover stating:

Satisfactory as it may be to note his general acceptance for the time being of the proposed relations of France with Arabia, his reference to the future of those relations adumbrates a source of trouble which it will be wise not to ignore. I have on more than one occasion brought to the notice of His Majesty's Government the deep antipathy with which the Arabs regard the prospect of French Administration of any portion of Arab territory. In this lies considerable danger to our future relations with France, because difficult and even impossible though it may be to convince France of her mistake, if we do not endeavour to do so by warning her of the real state of Arab feeling, we may hereafter be accused of instigating or encouraging the opposition to the French, which the Arabs now threaten and will assuredly give.

After discussions, Grey instructed that the French be informed of the situation, although Paul Cambon did not take the agreement that seriously.

=== Anglo-French negotiations (October 1915 – March 1916) ===
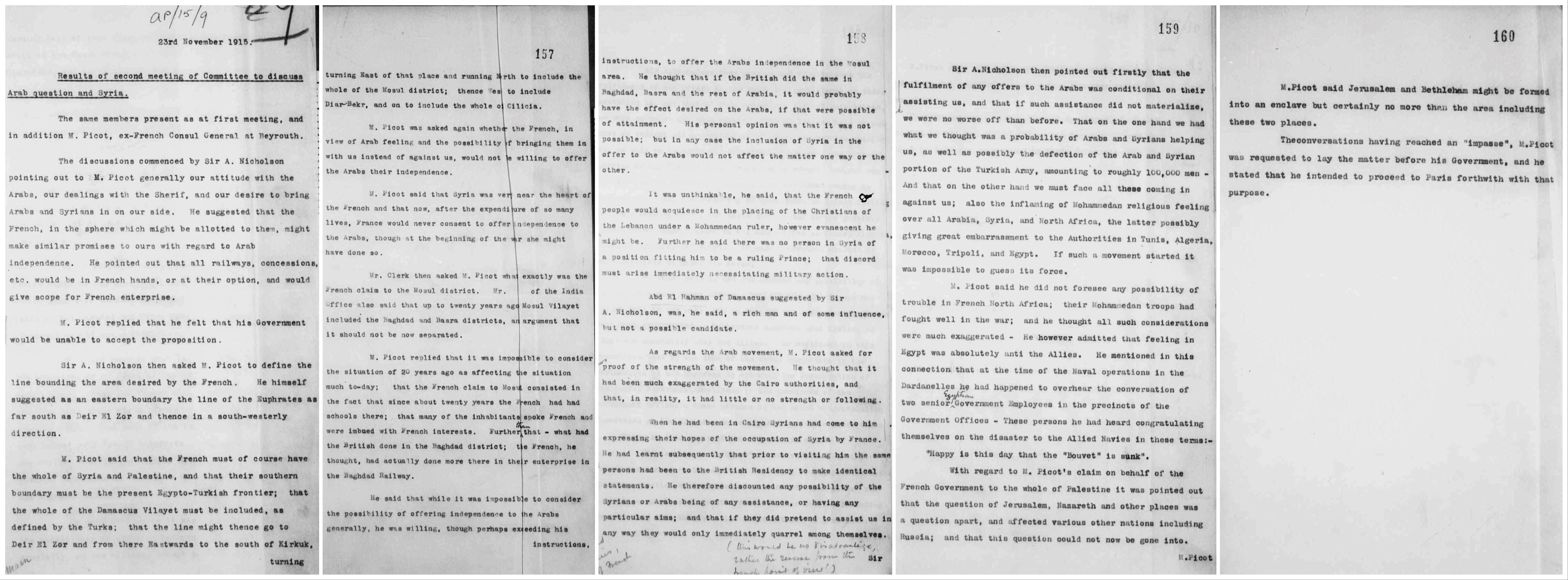
Minutes of the first negotiation on 23 November 1915, in which both sides set out their starting positions Picot proposed that the French area include: "the whole of Syria and Palestine, and that their southern boundary must be the present Egypto-Turkish frontier," that the boundary line would then go to "Deir ez-Zor and from there Eastwards to the south of Kirkuk, turning east of that place and running north to include the whole of the Mosul district; thence West to include Diyarbekir, and on to include the whole of Cilicia." The British had proposed as an eastern boundary: "the line of the Euphrates as far south as Deir ez-Zor and thence in south-westerly direction." With respect to Palestine, the British noted that "Jerusalem, Nazareth and other places was a question apart, and affected various other nations including Russia: and that this question could not now be gone into."

On 21 October 1915, Grey met Cambon and suggested France appoint a representative to discuss the future borders of Syria as Britain wished to back the creation of an independent Arab state. At this point Grey was faced with competing claims from the French and from Hussein and the day before had sent a telegram to Cairo telling the High Commissioner to be as vague as possible in his next letter to the Sharif when discussing the northwestern, Syrian, corner of the territory Hussein claimed and left McMahon with "discretion in the matter as it is urgent and there is not time to discuss an exact formula", adding, "If something more precise than this is required you can give it."

"The main problem to be solved is to discover a middle course which will harmonise with the requirements of the various parties, which are as follows:
(a) France requires a settlement which (1) while compensating her for the inconvenience and loss attendant upon the disruption of the Ottoman Empire, will (2) safeguard her historic and traditional position in Syria, (3) assure her of full opportunity of realising her economic aspirations in the Near East.
(b) The Arabs require (1) recognition of their nationality, (2) protection of their race from alien oppression, and (3) an opportunity of re-establishing their position as a contributing factor in the world's progress.
(c) Great Britain requires (1) to assure her position in the Persian Gulf, (2) opportunity to develop Lower Mesopotamia, (3) (a) commercial and military communication between the Persian Gulf and the Mediterranean by land, (b) influence in an area sufficient to provide the personnel engaged in Mesopotamia irrigation work with suitable sanatoria, and hill stations, and containing an adequate native recruiting ground for administrative purposes, (4) to obtain commercial facilities in the area under discussion.
(d) Lastly, such a settlement has to be worked in with an arrangement satisfactory to the conscientious desires of Christianity, Judaeism, and Mohammedanism in regard to the status of Jerusalem and the neighboring shrines."

— "Preliminary Observations"; Sykes–Picot Joint Memorandum, 3 January 1916

The first meeting of the British interdepartmental committee headed by Sir Arthur Nicolson with François Georges-Picot took place on 23 November 1915. Picot informed the Nicolson committee that France claimed the possession of land starting from where the Taurus Mountains approach the sea in Cilicia, following the Taurus Mountains and the mountains further East, so as to include Diyarbekir, Mosul and Erbil, and then returning to Deir ez-Zor on the Euphrates and from there southwards along the desert border, finishing eventually at the Egyptian frontier. Picot, however, added that he was prepared "to propose to the French government to throw Mosul into the Arab pool, if we did so in the case of Baghdad".

A second meeting of the Nicolson committee with Picot took place on 21 December 1915 wherein Picot said that he had obtained permission to agree to the towns of Aleppo, Hama, Homs and Damascus being included in the Arab dominions to be administered by the Arabs. Although the French had scaled back their demands to some extent, the British also claimed to want to include Lebanon in the future Arab State and this meeting also ended at an impasse.

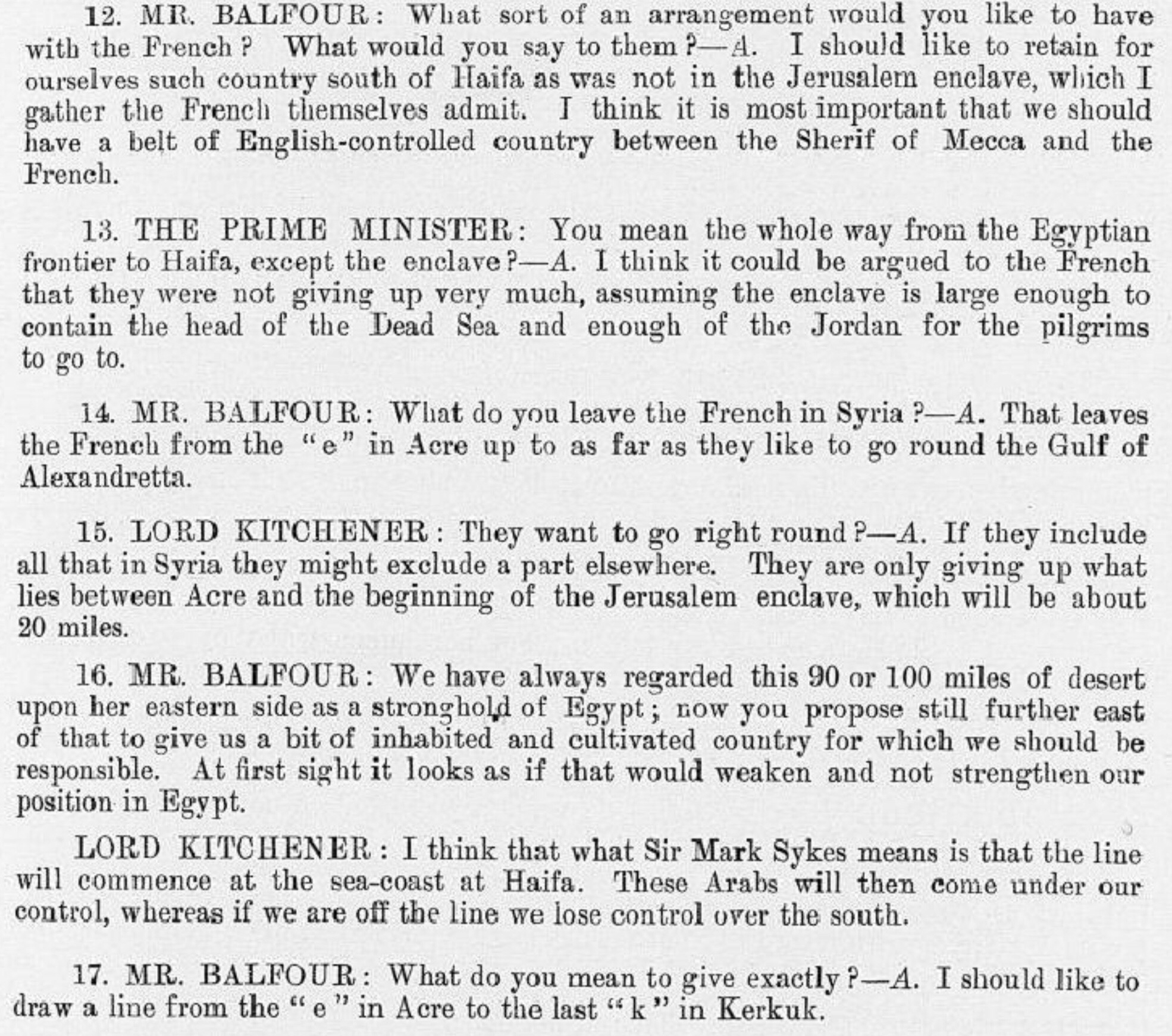
On 17 December, Sykes set out his objectives for the negotiation in an interview with the British War Committee. He stated his desire for British control over Palestine ("such country south of Haifa"), creating "a belt of English-controlled country" south of "a line from the 'e' in Acre to the last 'k' in Kirkuk".

On Tuesday 28 December, Mark Sykes informed Gilbert Clayton that he had "been given the Picot negotiations". Sykes and Picot entered into "almost daily" private discussions over the six-day period; no documents survive from these discussions.

On Monday 3 January 1916, they agreed and initialled a joint memorandum containing what was to become known as the Sykes–Picot Agreement. They had agreed to compromise on the two primary areas of difference—they split the Mosul Vilayet in two at the Little Zab river, with the French taking the northern part (Mosul and Erbil) and the British taking the southern part (Kirkuk and Sulaymaniyah), and Palestine was to be placed under an "international administration, the form of which is to be decided upon after consultation with Russia, and subsequently in consultation with the other allies, and the representatives of the sheriff of Mecca."

The memorandum was forwarded to the Foreign Office and circulated for comments. (Note: In 12 January 1916, a memorandum commenting on a draft of the agreement, William Reginald Hall, British Director of Naval Intelligence criticised the proposed agreement on the basis that "the Jews have a strong material, and a very strong political, interest in the future of the country" and that "in the Brown area the question of Zionism, and also of British control of all Palestine railways, in the interest of Egypt, have to be considered".) On 16 January, Sykes told the Foreign office that he had spoken to Picot and that he thought Paris would be able to agree. An interdepartmental conference was convened by Nicolson on 21 January. Following the meeting, a final draft agreement was circulated to the cabinet on 2 February, the War Committee considered it on the 3rd and finally at a meeting on the 4th between Bonar Law, Chamberlain, Lord Kitchener and others it was decided that:

M. Picot may inform his government that the acceptance of the whole project would entail the abdication of considerable British interests, but provided that the cooperation of the Arabs is secured, and that the Arabs fulfil the conditions and obtain the towns of Homs, Hama, Damascus and Aleppo, the British Government would not object to the arrangement. But, as the Blue Area extends so far Eastwards, and affects Russian interests, it would be absolutely essential that, before anything was concluded, the consent of Russia was obtained.

Picot was informed and five days later Cambon told Nicolson that "the French government were in accord with the proposals concerning the Arab question".

Later, in February and March, Sykes and Picot acted as advisors to Sir George Buchanan and the French ambassador respectively, during negotiations with Sazonov.

=== Formal British, French and Russian agreements (April–October 1916) ===
Eventually, Russia having agreed on 26 April 1916, the final terms were sent by Paul Cambon, the French Ambassador in London, to the Secretary of State for Foreign Affairs, Edward Grey, on 9 May 1916, and ratified in Grey's reply on 16 May 1916.

The formal agreements between Britain, France and Russia comprised the eleven letters below.

The eleven letters of the British-French-Russian agreements
Date	From	To	Description	Letter (Note: These eleven letters, starting with Sazonov's 26 April letter to Paléologue and ending with Grey's 23 October letter to Benckendorff, were compiled in a memorandum circulated to the British War Cabinet in April 1917)
26 April 1916	Sergey Sazonov, Russian Foreign Minister	Maurice Paléologue, French ambassador to Russia	The Sazonov–Paléologue Agreement confirming French agreement to the Russian annexation of Western Armenia	
26 April 1916	Paléologue	Sazonov	The Sazonov–Paléologue Agreement confirming French agreement to the Russian annexation of Western Armenia	
9 May 1916	Paul Cambon, French ambassador to London	Edward Grey, British Foreign Minister	French agreement to the Sykes–Picot Agreement (this document is the official French-language version of the Sykes–Picot Agreement)	
15 May 1916	Grey	Cambon	Mutual confirmation to protect each other's pre-existing interests in the allotted areas	
15 May 1916	Cambon	Grey	Mutual confirmation to protect each other's pre-existing interests in the allotted areas	
16 May 1916	Grey	Cambon	British agreement to the Sykes–Picot Agreement (this document is the official English-language version of the Sykes–Picot Agreement)	
23 May 1916	Grey	Benckendorff	Proposed an Anglo-Russian acceptance to the Russo-French Sazonov–Paléologue Agreement and the Anglo-French Sykes–Picot Agreement	
25 August 1916	Cambon	Grey	Replaced the word "protect" with "uphold" before the words "an independent Arab State"	
30 August 1916	Robert Crewe-Milnes, British Deputy Foreign Minister	Cambon	Replaced the word "protect" with "uphold" before the words "an independent Arab State"	
1 September 1916	Alexander von Benckendorff, Russian ambassador to London	Grey	Confirmed Russian and British agreement to the Sazonov–Paléologue Agreement and the Sykes–Picot Agreement	
23 October 1916	Grey	Benckendorff	Confirmed Russian and British agreement to the Sazonov–Paléologue Agreement and the Sykes–Picot Agreement	

In the chain of agreements between France, Russia and Britain, the Russian claims were assented to first: France confirmed their agreement on 26 April and Britain on 23 May, with formal sanction on 23 October. The Anglo-French agreement was confirmed in an exchange of letters on 9 May and 16 May.

=== Agreement with Italy (April–August 1917) ===
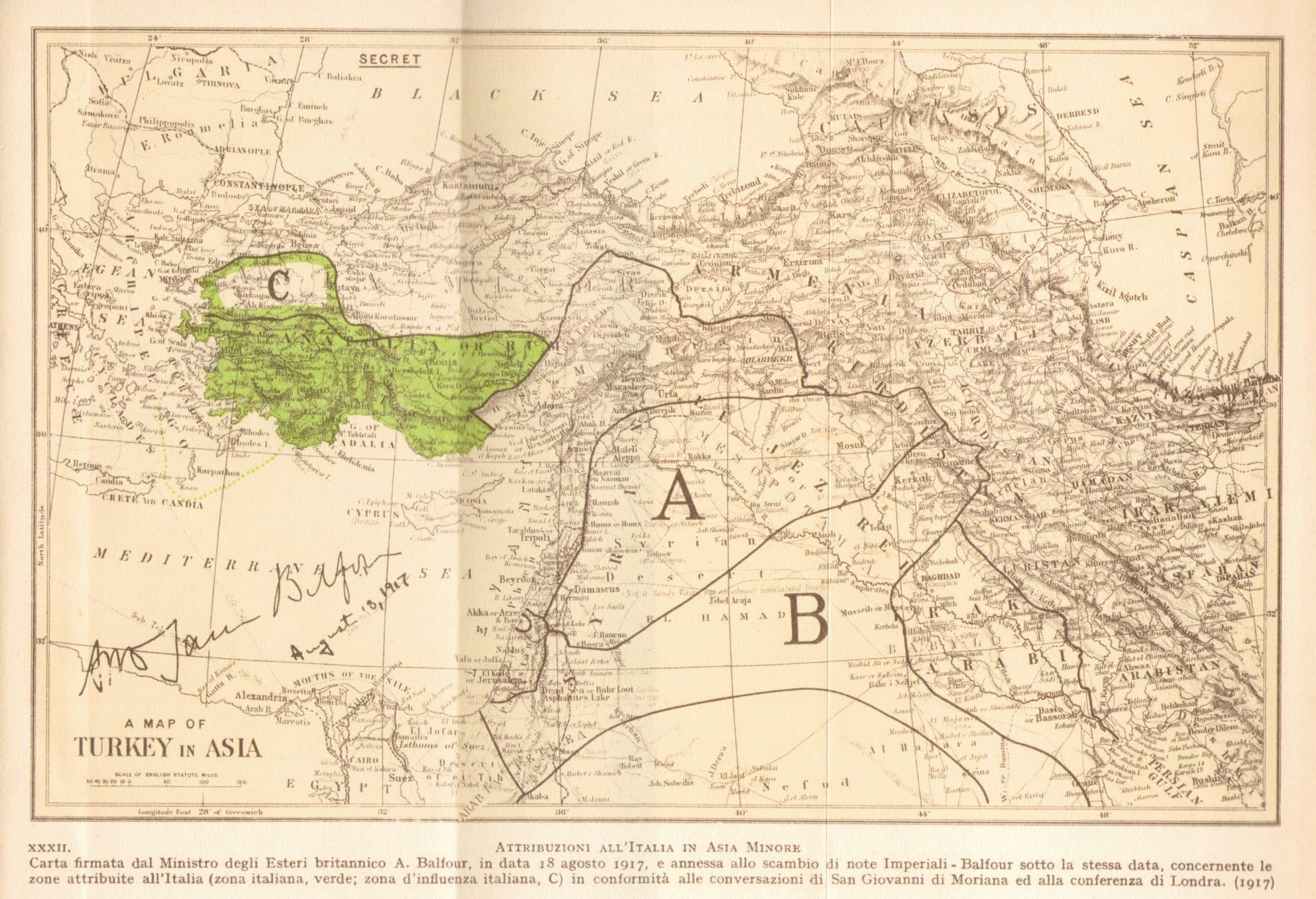
Map of the agreement, signed by Balfour in August 1917

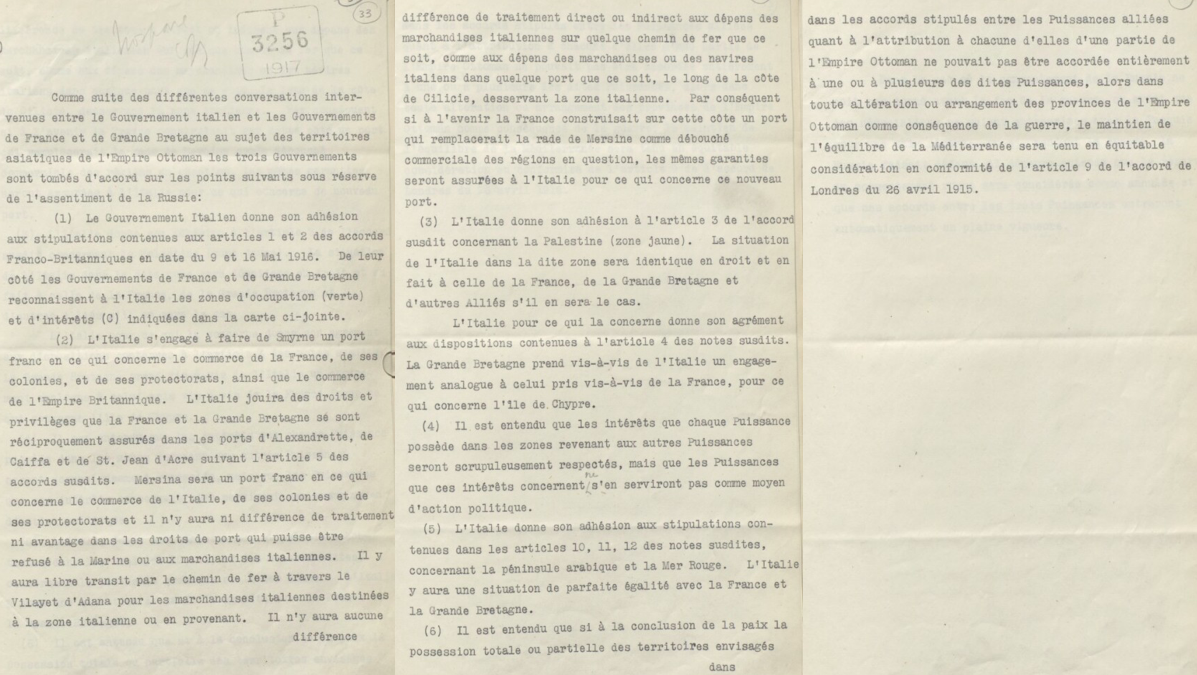
The agreement ratified between the Allies, subject to the consent of Russia (which was never achieved), in August 1917

The Agreement of Saint-Jean-de-Maurienne

In a meeting in a railway car at Saint-Jean-de-Maurienne on 19 April 1917, a tentative agreement was reached between British and French Prime Ministers, David Lloyd George and Alexandre Ribot, and the Italian Prime Minister and Foreign Minister, Paolo Boselli and Sidney Sonnino; to settle the Italian interest in the Ottoman Empire—specifically article 9 of the Treaty of London. The agreement was needed by the Allies to secure the position of Italian forces in West Asia.

The goal was to balance the military power drops at the Middle Eastern theatre of World War I as Russian (Tsarist) forces were pulling out of the Caucasus campaign, even though they were replaced with the forces of what would be called the First Republic of Armenia. It was clear to the Italians that the area allotted to them may not be easily given up by the Turkish Empire, such that the British Prime Minister proposed a vague formula for post-war adjustment should the actual post-war allocation not appear to be balanced.

The agreement was drafted and negotiated by the countries' diplomats over the coming months, and signed by the allies between 18 August and 26 September 1917. Russia was not represented in this agreement as the Tsarist regime was in the midst of a revolution. The lack of Russian consent to the Saint-Jean-de-Maurienne agreement was subsequently used by the British at the 1919 Paris Peace Conference to invalidate it, a position that greatly incensed the Italian government.

=== The brown zone and the imperial interest ===
Vereté describes how a dispute with the Ottoman Empire over the Eastern boundary of Egypt ended in 1906 when the borders were redrawn along the Rafa-Aqaba line and subsequently the fear of an attack on Egypt led to an increased strategic importance of "The hinterland of Sinai, western and eastern Palestine at least up to the Acre-Dar'a line".

Palestine was discussed between various members of the British Civil Service. Lord Kitchener, the recently appointed Secretary of State for War had been recalled from his position as Consul-General in Egypt; his secretary Oswald FitzGerald discussed the matter with Ronald Storrs, the Oriental Secretary in Cairo, who wrote on 28 December 1914: "the inclusion of a part of Palestine in the Egyptian Protectorate [with Jerusalem as a free city could be] a possible solution... [This would make] Jewish infiltration into Palestine... less obvious and annoying to the susceptibilities of the Moslem and even certain elements in the Christian world"

After the Constantinople agreement, the French approached the British with a view to working out their mutual desiderata and the British, on 8 April 1915, set up the De Bunsen Committee to consider British options. Zionism was not considered by the report of the committee, submitted in June 1915, which concluded that, in case of the partition or zones of influence options, there should be a British sphere of influence that included Palestine while accepting that there were relevant French and Russian as well as Islamic interests in Jerusalem and the Holy Places.

Mark Sykes was dispatched on instructions of the War Office at the beginning of June to discuss the committee's findings with the British authorities in the Near and Middle East and at the same time to study the situation on the spot. He went to Athens, Gallipoli, Sofia, Cairo, Aden, Cairo a second time and then to India coming back to Basra in September and a third time to Cairo in November (where he was apprised of the McMahon–Hussein Correspondence) before returning home on 8 December and finally delivering his report to the War Committee on 16 December.

== Economic aspects ==
In his introduction to a 2016 Symposium on the subject of Sykes–Picot, law professor Anghie notes that much of the agreement is given over to "commercial and trade arrangements, to access to ports and the construction of railways".

Loevy makes a similar point in respect of sections 4 to 8 of the agreement and refers to British and French practising "Ottoman colonial development as insiders" and that this experience acted as a road map for the later wartime negotiations. Khalidi point to the negotiations between Britain and France in 1913 and 1914 with respect to the Homs–Baghdad railway as well as the pre-war agreements that both empires made with Germany over other regions of the Middle East, as laying "a clear basis" for their later spheres of influence under the agreement.

In his doctoral thesis, Gibson discusses the part played by oil in British strategic thinking at the time and mentions the Mosul vilayet as the largest potential oilfield and France's agreement in 1918 to agree to its inclusion in the Iraq Mandate (the Clemenceau Lloyd George Agreement) in exchange for "a share of the oil and British support elsewhere".

== The agreement in practice ==
=== Syria, Palestine, and the Arabs ===
Zones of French and British influence and control proposed in the Sykes–Picot Agreement in 1916

==== Asquith Government (1916) ====
Hussein's letter of 18 February 1916 appealed to McMahon for £50,000 in gold plus weapons, ammunition and food claiming that Feisal was awaiting the arrival of "not less than 100,000 people" for the planned revolt and McMahon's reply of 10 March 1916 confirmed the British agreement to the requests and concluded the ten letters of the correspondence. In April and May, there were discussions initiated by Sykes as to the merits of a meeting to include Picot and the Arabs to mesh the desiderata of both sides. At the same time, logistics in relation to the promised revolt were being dealt with and there was a rising level of impatience for action to be taken by Hussein. Finally, at the end of April, McMahon was advised of the terms of Sykes–Picot and he and Grey agreed that these would not be disclosed to the Arabs.

The Arab revolt was officially initiated by Hussein at Mecca on 10 June 1916 although his sons 'Ali and Faisal had already initiated operations at Medina starting on 5 June. The timing had been brought forward by Hussein and, according to Cairo, "Neither he nor we were at all ready in early June, 1916, and it was only with the greatest of difficulty that a minimum of sufficient assistance in material could be scraped together to ensure initial success."

Colonel Édouard Brémond was dispatched to Arabia in September 1916 as head of the French military mission to the Arabs. According to Cairo, Brémond was intent on containing the revolt so that the Arabs might not in any way threaten French interests in Syria. These concerns were not taken up in London, British-French cooperation was thought paramount and Cairo made aware of that. (Wingate was informed in late November that "it would seem desirable to impress upon your subordinates the need for the most loyal cooperation with the French whom His Majesty's Government do not suspect of ulterior designs in the Hijaz".)

As 1916 drew to a close, the Asquith government which had been under increasing pressure and criticism mainly due to its conduct of the war, gave way on 6 December to David Lloyd George who had been critical of the war effort and had succeeded Kitchener as Secretary of State for War after his untimely death in June. Lloyd George had wanted to make the destruction of the Ottoman Empire a major British war aim, and two days after taking office told Robertson that he wanted a major victory, preferably the capture of Jerusalem, to impress British public opinion. The EEF were, at the time, in defensive mode at a line on the eastern edge of the Sinai at El Arish and 15 miles from the borders of Ottoman Palestine. Lloyd George "at once" consulted his War Cabinet about a "further campaign into Palestine when El Arish had been secured". Pressure from Lloyd George (over the reservations of Chief of the General Staff) resulted in the capture of Rafa and the arrival of British forces at the borders of the Ottoman Empire.

==== Lloyd George Government (1917 onwards) ====
Lloyd George set up a new small War Cabinet initially comprising Lords Curzon and Milner, Bonar Law, Arthur Henderson and himself; Hankey became the Secretary with Sykes, Ormsby-Gore and Amery as assistants. Although Arthur Balfour replaced Grey as Foreign Secretary, his exclusion from the War Cabinet and the activist stance of its members weakened his influence over foreign policy.

The French chose Picot as French High Commissioner for the soon to be occupied territory of Syria and Palestine. The British appointed Sykes as Chief Political Officer to the Egyptian Expeditionary Force. On 3 April 1917, Sykes met with Lloyd George, Curzon and Hankey to receive his instructions in this regard, namely to keep the French onside while pressing for a British Palestine. First Sykes in early May and then Picot and Sykes together visited the Hejaz later in May to discuss the agreement with Faisal and Hussein. Hussein was persuaded to agree to a formula to the effect that the French would pursue the same policy in Syria as the British in Baghdad; since Hussein believed that Baghdad would be part of the Arab State, that had eventually satisfied him. Later reports from participants expressed doubts about the precise nature of the discussions and the degree to which Hussein had really been informed as to the terms of Sykes–Picot.

Italy's participation in the war, governed by the Treaty of London, eventually led to the Agreement of Saint-Jean-de-Maurienne in April 1917; at this conference, Lloyd George had raised the question of a British protectorate of Palestine and the idea "had been very coldly received" by the French and the Italians. The War Cabinet, reviewing this conference on 25 April, "inclined to the view that sooner or later the Sykes–Picot Agreement might have to be reconsidered ... No action should be taken at present in this matter".

In between the meetings with Hussein, Sykes had informed London that "the sooner French Military Mission is removed from Hedjaz the better" and then Lord Bertie was instructed to request the same from the French on the grounds that the mission was hostile to the Arab cause and which "cannot but prejudice Allied relations and policy in the Hedjaz and may even affect whole future of French relations with the Arabs". After the French response to this, on 31 May 1917, William Ormsby-Gore wrote:

The British Government, in authorising the letters despatched to King Hussein [Sharif of Mecca] before the outbreak of the revolt by Sir Henry McMahon, would seem to raise a doubt as to whether our pledges to King Hussein as head of the Arab nation are consistent with French intentions to make not only Syria but Upper Mesopotamia another Tunis. If our support of King Hussein and the other Arabian leaders of less distinguished origin and prestige means anything it means that we are prepared to recognize the full sovereign independence of the Arabs of Arabia and Syria. It would seem time to acquaint the French Government with our detailed pledges to King Hussein, and to make it clear to the latter whether he or someone else is to be the ruler of Damascus, which is the one possible capital for an Arab State, which could command the obedience of the other Arabian Emirs.

In a further sign of British discontent with Sykes–Picot, in August, Sykes penned a "Memorandum on the Asia Minor Agreement" that was tantamount to advocating its renegotiation else that it be made clear to the French that they "make good—that is to say that if they cannot make a military effort compatible with their policy they should modify their policy". After many discussions, Sykes was directed to conclude with Picot an agreement or supplement to Sykes–Picot ("Projet d'Arrangement") covering the "future status of the Hejaz and Arabia" and this was achieved by the end of September. However, by the end of the year, the agreement had yet to be ratified by the French Government.

The Balfour Declaration along with its potential claim in Palestine was in the meantime issued on 2 November and the British entered Jerusalem on 9 December, with Allenby on foot 2 days later accompanied by representatives of the French and Italian detachments.

==== After public disclosure (1917–1918) ====
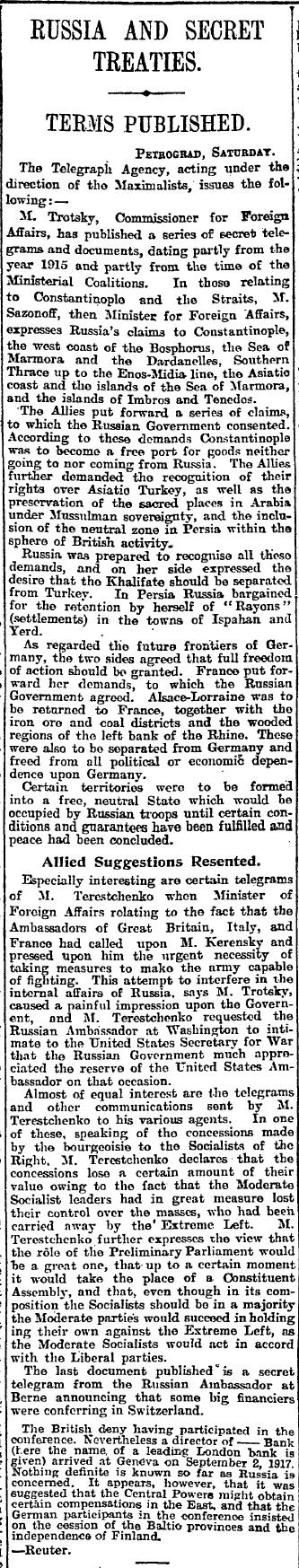
Excerpt from The Manchester Guardian, Monday, November 26, 1917. This was the first English-language reference to what became known as the Sykes-Picot Agreement.

Russian claims in the Ottoman Empire were denied following the Bolshevik Revolution, and the Bolsheviks released a copy of the Sykes–Picot Agreement (as well as other treaties). They revealed full texts in Izvestia and Pravda on 23 November 1917; subsequently, The Manchester Guardian printed the texts on 26 November 1917. That caused great embarrassment to the allies and growing distrust between them and the Arabs. Earlier, in April, the Zionists had confirmed the details of the Agreement with the British government.

U.S. President Woodrow Wilson had rejected all secret agreements made between the Allies and promoted open diplomacy as well as ideas about self-determination. On 22 November 1917, Leon Trotsky addressed a note to the ambassadors at Petrograd "containing proposals for a truce and a democratic peace without annexation and without indemnities, based on the principle of the independence of nations, and of their right to determine the nature of their own development themselves". Peace negotiations with the Quadruple Alliance—Germany, Austria–Hungary, Bulgaria and Turkey—started at Brest–Litovsk one month later. On behalf of the Quadruple Alliance, Count Czernin, replied on 25 December that the "question of State allegiance of national groups which possess no State independence" should be solved by "every State with its peoples independently in a constitutional manner", and that "the right of minorities forms an essential component part of the constitutional right of peoples to self-determination".

In his turn, Lloyd George delivered a speech on war aims on 5 January, including references to the right of self-determination and "consent of the governed" as well as to secret treaties and the changed circumstances regarding them. Three days later, Wilson weighed in with his Fourteen Points, the twelfth being that "the Turkish portions of the present Ottoman Empire should be assured a secure sovereignty, but the other nationalities which are now under Turkish rule should be assured an undoubted security of life and an absolutely unmolested opportunity of autonomous development".

On 23 December 1917, Sykes (who had been sent to France in mid-December to see what was happening with the Projet d'Arrangement) and a representative of the French Ministry of Foreign Affairs had delivered public addresses to the Central Syrian Committee at Paris (Note: This organization, formed in France in 1917, later made a presentation to the Paris peace conference claiming to represent Syria and with a position opposed to that of Faisal. It later transpired that its chairman, Shukri Ghanim had spent the previous 35 years in France.) in Paris on the non-Turkish elements of the Ottoman Empire, including liberated Jerusalem. Sykes had stated that the accomplished fact of the independence of the Hejaz rendered it almost impossible that an effective and real autonomy should be refused to Syria. However, the minutes also record that the Syrian Arabs in Egypt were not happy with developments and absent a clearer, less ambiguous statement in regard to the future of Syria and Mesopotamia then the Allies as well as the King of the Hedjaz would lose much Arab support.

Sykes was the author of the Hogarth Message a secret January 1918 message to Hussein following his request for an explanation of the Balfour Declaration and the Bassett Letter was a letter (also secret) dated 8 February 1918 from the British Government to Hussein following his request for an explanation of the Sykes–Picot Agreement.

The failure of the Projet d'Arrangement reflected poorly on Sykes and following on from the doubts about his explanations of Sykes–Picot to Hussein the previous year, weakened his credibility on Middle Eastern affairs throughout 1918. Still (at his own request, now Acting Adviser on Arabian and Palestine Affairs at the Foreign Office) he continued his criticism of Sykes–Picot, minuting on 16 February that "the Anglo–French Agreement of 1916 in regard to Asia Minor should come up for reconsideration" and then on 3 March, writing to Clayton, "the stipulations in regard to the red and blue areas can only be regarded as quite contrary to the spirit of every ministerial speech that has been made for the last three months".

On 28 March 1918 the first meeting of the newly formed Eastern Committee was held, chaired by Curzon. (Note: Formed from the merger in March of the Middle East Committee (previously the Mesopotamia Administration Committee) with the Foreign Office Committee on Russia and the interdepartmental Persia Committee.)

In May, Clayton told Balfour that Picot had, in response to a suggestion that the agreement was moot, "allowed that considerable revision was required in view of changes that had taken place in the situation since agreement was drawn up", but nevertheless considered that "agreement holds, at any rate principle".

The British issued the Declaration to the Seven on 16 June, the first British pronouncement to the Arabs advancing the principle of national self-determination.

On 30 September 1918, supporters of the Arab Revolt in Damascus declared a government loyal to the Sharif of Mecca. He had been declared King of the Arabs by a handful of religious leaders and other notables in Mecca.

The Arab and British armies entered Damascus on 1 October 1918, and on 3 October 1918 Ali Rida al-Rikabi was appointed Military Governor of Occupied Enemy Territory Administration East. Faisal entered Damascus on 4 October and appointed Rikabi Chief of the Council of Directors (i.e. prime minister) of Syria.

On 5 October, with the permission of General Allenby, Faisal announced the establishment of a fully and absolutely independent Arab constitutional government. Faisal announced it would be an Arab government based on justice and equality for all Arabs regardless of religion.

The Anglo-French Declaration of November 1918 pledged that Great Britain and France would "assist in the establishment of indigenous Governments and administrations in Syria and Mesopotamia" by "setting up of national governments and administrations deriving their authority from the free exercise of the initiative and choice of the indigenous populations". The French had reluctantly agreed to issue the declaration at the insistence of the British. Minutes of a British War Cabinet meeting reveal that the British had cited the laws of conquest and military occupation to avoid sharing the administration with the French under a civilian regime. The British stressed that the terms of the Anglo–French declaration had superseded the Sykes–Picot Agreement in order to justify fresh negotiations over the allocation of the territories of Syria, Mesopotamia, and Palestine.

George Curzon said the Great Powers were still committed to the Règlement Organique agreement, which concerned governance and non-intervention in the affairs of the Maronite, Orthodox Christian, Druze and Muslim communities, regarding the Beirut Vilayet of June 1861 and September 1864, and added that the rights granted to France in what is today modern Syria and parts of Turkey under Sykes–Picot were incompatible with that agreement.

===== Mosul and Palestine modification =====
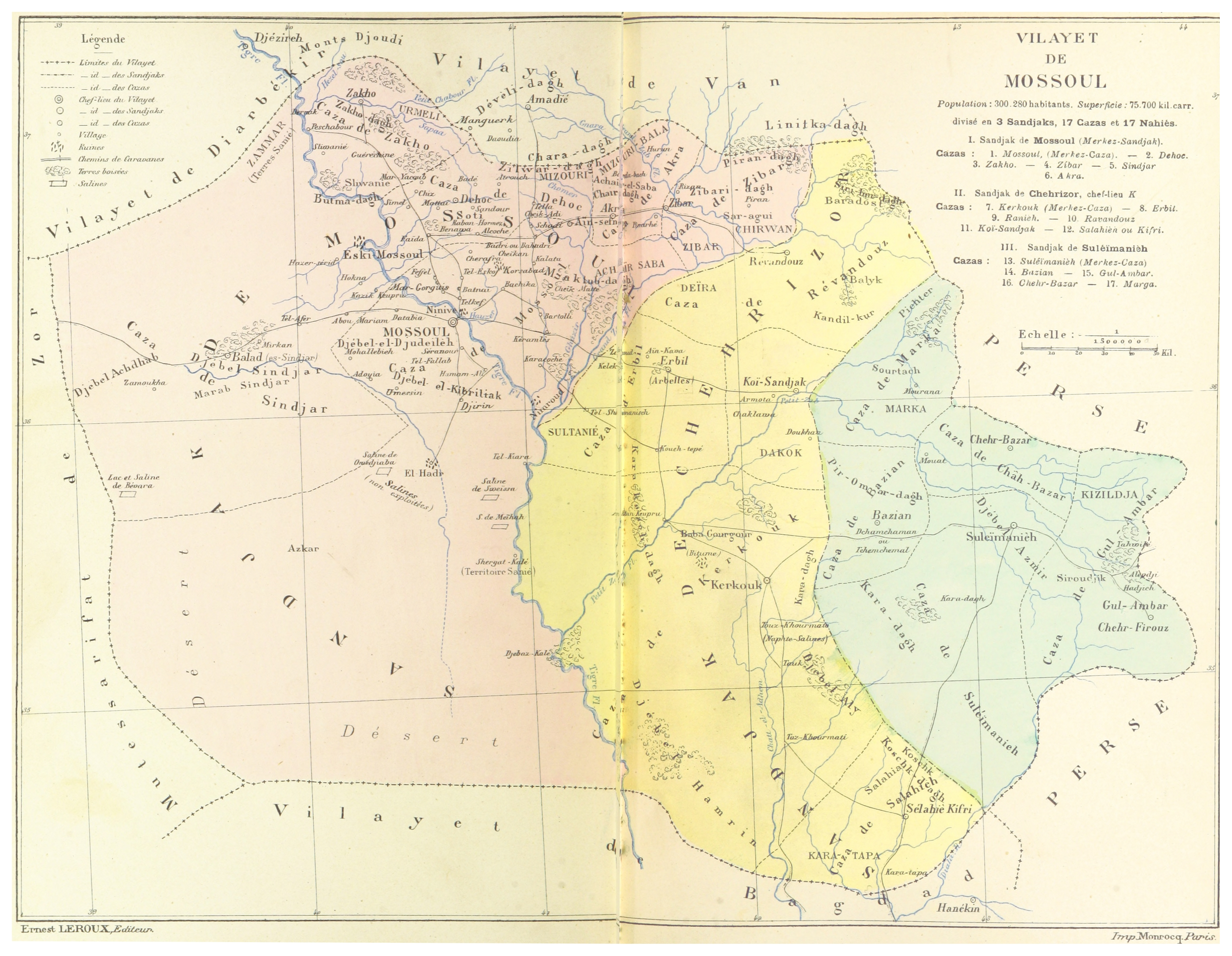
Mosul Vilayet in 1892

On 30 October, the Ottoman Empire had signed the Armistice of Mudros. On 2 November, the British occupied the Mosul Vilayet which led to the territorial dispute known as the Mosul Question.

At the French embassy in London on Sunday 1 December, David Lloyd George and Clemenceau had a private and undocumented meeting where the latter surrendered French rights to Mosul (the city of Mosul and south to the Little Zab) and to Palestine that had been given by the Sykes–Picot Agreement. (Note: Ray Stannard Baker described this "agreement" as a secret treaty) Although Lloyd George and others have suggested that nothing was given in return, according to Ian Rutledge and James Barr, Lloyd George promised at least one or even all of, support for French claims on the Ruhr, that when oil production in Mosul began, France would receive a share and that Sykes–Picot obligation would be maintained as regards Syria.

==== Paris Peace Conference (1919–1920) ====
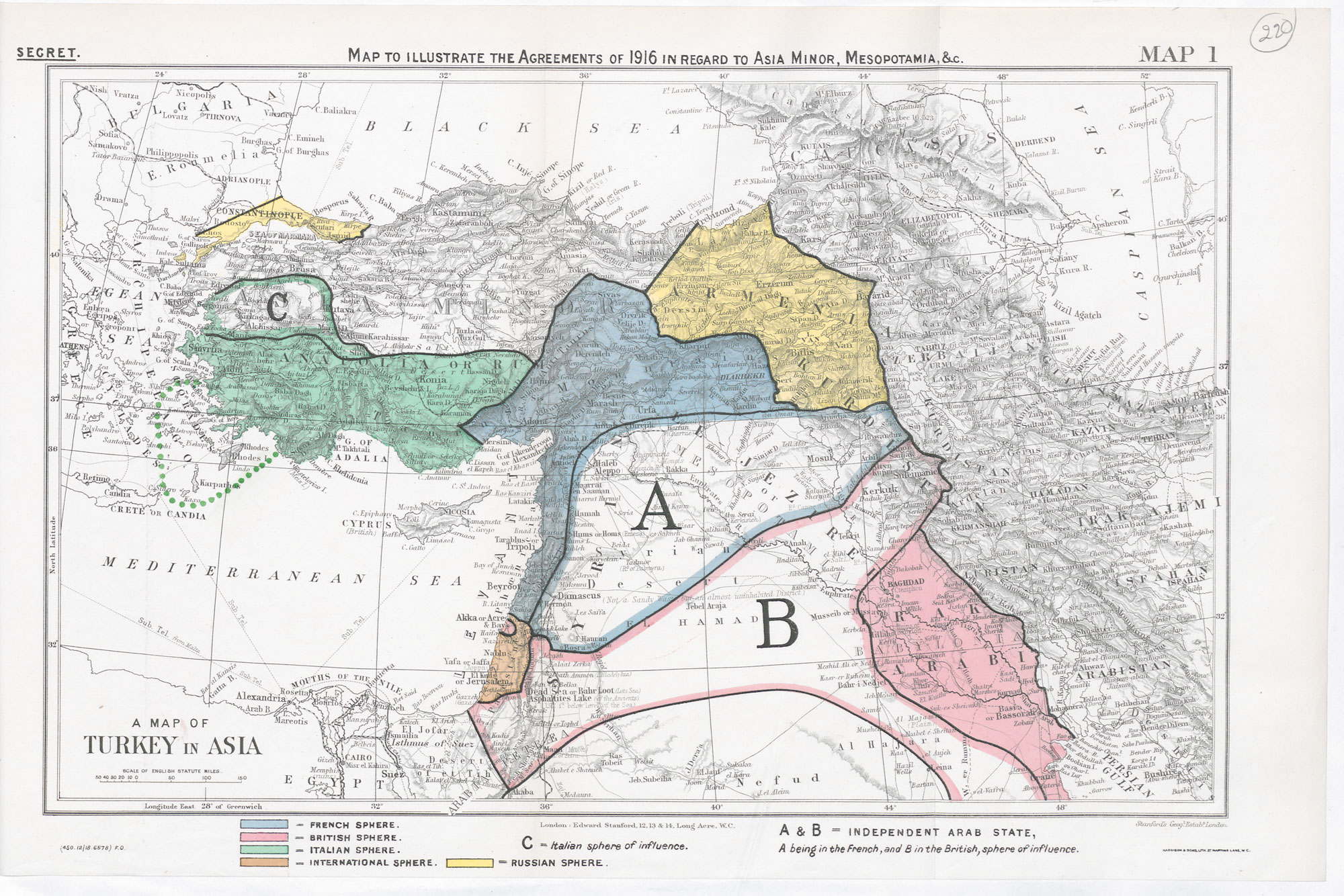
January 1919 British Foreign Office memorandum

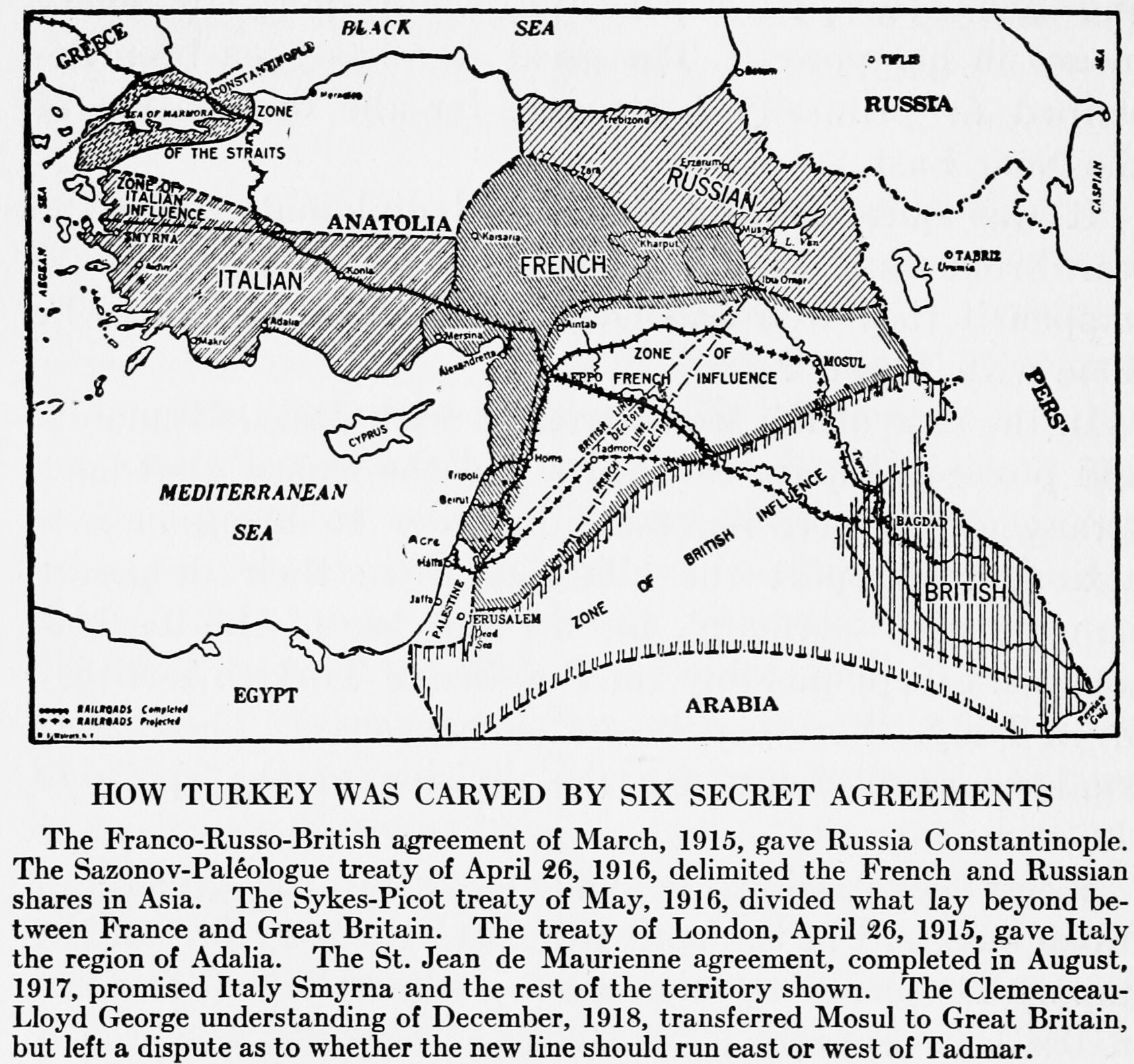
1923 map by Ray Stannard Baker, who was Woodrow Wilson's press secretary during the Paris Peace Conference

Maps of the wartime secret treaties regarding the partitioning of the Ottoman Empire

The Eastern Committee met nine times in November and December to draft a set of resolutions on British policy for the benefit of the negotiators.

On 21 October, the War Cabinet asked Smuts to prepare the peace brief in summary form and he asked Erle Richards to carry out this task resulting in a "P-memo" for use by the Peace Conference delegates. The conclusions of the Eastern Committee at page 4 of the P-memo included as objectives the cancellation of Sykes–Picot and supporting the Arabs in their claim to a state with capital at Damascus (in line with the McMahon–Hussein correspondence).

At the Peace Conference, which officially opened on 18 January, the Big Four (initially a "Council of Ten" comprising two delegates each from Britain, France, the United States, Italy and Japan, but Japan withdrew from the conference) agreed, on 30 January, the outlines of a Mandate system (including three levels of Mandate) later to become Article 22 of the League Covenant. The Big Four would later decide which communities, under what conditions and which Mandatory.

Minutes taken during a meeting of The Big Four held in Paris on 20 March 1919 and attended by Woodrow Wilson, Georges Clemenceau, Vittorio Emanuele Orlando as well as Lloyd George and Arthur Balfour, explained the British and French points of view concerning the agreement. It was the first topic brought up during the discussion of Syria and Turkey, and formed the focus of all discussions thereafter.

The Anglo-French Declaration was read into the minutes, Pichon commenting that it showed the disinterested position of both governments in regard to the Arabs and Lloyd George that it was "more important than all the old agreements". Pichon went on to mention a proposed scheme of agreement of 15 February based on the private agreement reached between Clemenceau and Lloyd George the previous December. (According to Lieshout, just before Faisal made his presentation to the conference on the 6th, Clemenceau handed Lloyd George a proposal which appears to cover the same subject matter; Lieshout having accessed related British materials dated the 6th whereas the date in the minutes is unsourced.)

In the subsequent discussions, France staked its claim to Syria (and its mandate) while the British sought to carve out the Arab areas of zones A and B arguing that France had implicitly accepted such an arrangement even though it was the British that had entered into the arrangement with the Arabs.

Wilson intervened and stressed the principle of consent of the governed whether it be Syria or Mesopotamia, that he thought the issues involved the peace of the world and were not necessarily just a matter between France and Britain. He suggested that an Inter-Allied Commission be formed and sent out to find out the wishes of local inhabitants in the region. The discussion concluded with Wilson agreeing to draft a Terms of Reference to the commission.

On 21 April, Faisal left for the East. Before he left, on 17 April, Clemenceau sent a draft letter, in which the French government declared that they recognized "the right of Syria to independence in the form of a federation of autonomous governments in agreement with the traditions and wishes of the populations", and claimed that Faisal had recognized "that France is the Power qualified to render Syria the assistance of various advisors necessary to introduce order and realise the progress demanded by the Syrian populations" and on 20 April, Faisal assured Clemenceau that he had been "Deeply impressed by the disinterested friendliness of your statements to me while I was in Paris, and must thank you for having been the first to suggest the dispatch of the inter-allied Commission, which is to leave shortly for the East to ascertain the wishes of the local peoples as to the future organisation of their country. I am sure that the people of Syria will know how to show you their gratitude."

Meanwhile, as of late May, the standoff between the French and the British as to disposition of forces continued, the French continued to press for a replacement of British by French troops in Syria amid arguments about precise geographical limits of same and in general the relationship suffered; after the meeting on the 21st, Lloyd George had written to Clemenceau and cancelled the Long–Bérenger Oil Agreement (a revised version of which had been agreed at the end of April) claiming to have known nothing about it and not wanting it to become an issue while Clemenceau claimed that had not been the subject of any argument. There were also discussions as to what precisely had been agreed or not at the private meeting between Clemenceau and Lloyd George the previous December.

In June 1919, the American King–Crane Commission arrived in Syria to inquire into local public opinion about the future of the country. After many vicissitudes, "mired in confusion and intrigue", "Lloyd George had second thoughts...", the French and British had declined to participate.

The Syrian National Congress had been convened in May 1919 to consider the future of the region of Syria and to present Arab views contained in a 2 July resolution to the King-Crane Commission.

The peace treaty with Germany was signed on 28 June and with the departure of Wilson and Lloyd George from Paris, the result was that the Turkey/Syria question was effectively placed on hold.

On 15 September, the British handed out an Aide Memoire (which had been discussed privately two days before between Lloyd George and Clemenceau) whereby the British would withdraw their troops to Palestine and Mesopotamia and hand over Damascus, Homs, Hama and Aleppo to Faisal's forces. While accepting the withdrawal, Clemenceau continued to insist on the Sykes–Picot agreement as being the basis for all discussions.

On 18 September, Faisal arrived in London and the next day and on the 23rd had lengthy meetings with Lloyd George who explained the Aide Memoire and British position. Lloyd George explained that he was "in the position of a man who had inherited two sets of engagements, those to King Hussein and those to the French", Faisal noting that the arrangement "seemed to be based on the 1916 agreement between the British and the French". Clemenceau, replying in respect of the Aide Memoire, refused to move on Syria and said that the matter should be left for the French to handle directly with Faisal.

Faisal arrived in Paris on 20 October and eventually on 6 January 1920 Faisal accepted a French mandate "for the whole of Syria", while France in return consented "to the formation of an Arab state that included Damascus, Homs, Hama and Aleppo, and was to be administered by the Emir with the assistance of French advisers" (acknowledged "the right of Syrians to unite to govern themselves as an independent nation".). In the meantime, British forces withdrew from Damascus on 26 November.

Faisal returned to Damascus on 16 January and Millerand took over from Clemenceau on the 20th. A Syrian National Congress meeting in Damascus declared an independent state of Syria on 8 March 1920. The new state intended to include portions of Syria, Palestine, and northern Mesopotamia. Faisal was declared the head of State. At the same time Prince Zeid, Faisal's brother, was declared Regent of Mesopotamia.

In April 1920, the San Remo conference handed out Class A mandates over Syria to France, and Iraq and Palestine to Britain. The same conference ratified an oil agreement reached at a London conference on 12 February, based on a slightly different version of the Long Berenger agreement previously initialled in London on 21 December.

France had decided to govern Syria directly, and took action to enforce the French Mandate of Syria before the terms had been accepted by the Council of the League of Nations. The French issued an ultimatum and intervened militarily at the Battle of Maysalun in June 1920. They deposed the indigenous Arab government, and removed King Faisal from Damascus in August 1920. Great Britain also appointed a High Commissioner and established their own mandatory regime in Palestine, without first obtaining approval from the Council of the League of Nations, or obtaining the formal cession of the territory from the former sovereign, Turkey.

=== Iraq and the Persian Gulf ===
In November 1914, the British had occupied Basra. According to the report of the de Bunsen Committee, British interests in Mesopotamia were defined by the need to protect the western flank of India and protect commercial interests including oil. The British also became concerned about the Berlin–Baghdad railway. Although never ratified, the British had also initialled the Anglo-Ottoman Convention of 1913.

As part of the Mesopotamian campaign, on 11 March 1917, the British entered Baghdad, the Armistice of Mudros was signed on 30 October 1918 although the British continued their advance, entering Mosul on 2 November.

Following the award of the British Mandate of Mesopotamia at San Remo, the British were faced with an Iraqi revolt against the British from July until February 1921, as well as a Kurdish revolt in Northern Iraq. Following the Cairo Conference it was decided that Faisal should be installed as ruler in Mandatory Iraq.

=== Kurds and Assyrians ===
"Maunsell's map", the British government's pre–World War I ethnographical map of the area covered by the agreement

As originally cast, Sykes–Picot allocated part of Northern Kurdistan and a substantial part of the Mosul vilayet including the city of Mosul to France in area B, Russia obtained Bitlis and Van in Northern Kurdistan (the contemplated Arab State included Kurds in its Eastern limit split between A and B areas). Bowman says there were around 2.5 million Kurds in Turkey, mainly in the mountain region called Kurdistan.

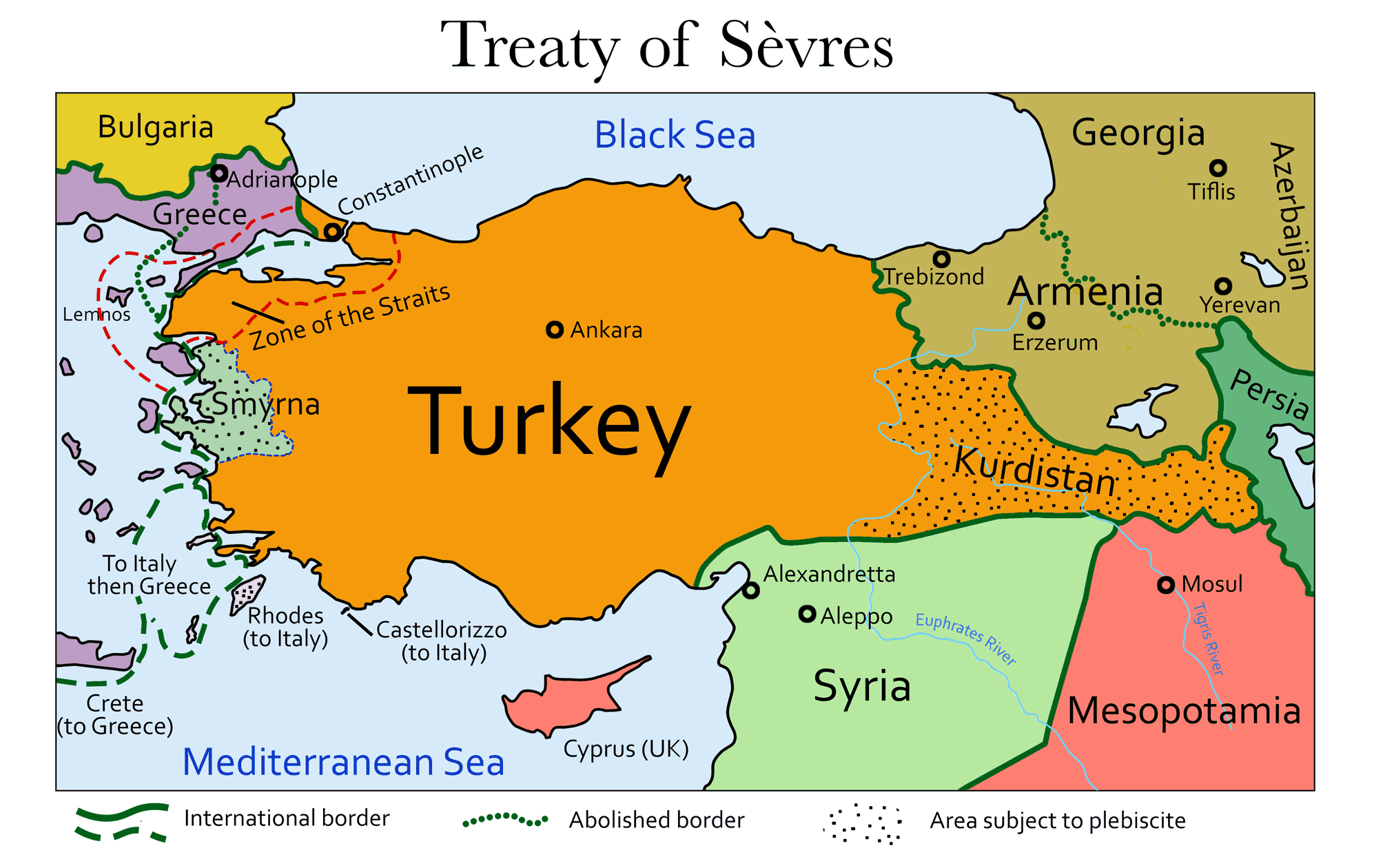
Partitioning of Ottoman Empire according to the aborted Treaty of Sèvres

Şerif Pasha known as Sharif Pasha presented a "Memorandum on the Claims of the Kurd People" to the Paris Peace Conference in 1919 and the suppressed report of the King–Crane Commission also recommended a form of autonomy in "the natural geographical area which lies between the proposed Armenia on the north and Mesopotamia on the south, with the divide between the Euphrates and the Tigris as the western boundary, and the Persian frontier as the eastern boundary".

The Russians gave up territorial claims following the Bolshevik revolution and at the San Remo conference, the French were awarded the French Mandate of Syria and the English the British Mandate of Mesopotamia. The subsequent Treaty of Sèvres potentially provided for a Kurdish territory subject to a referendum and League of Nations sanction within a year of the treaty. However, the Turkish War of Independence led to the treaty being superseded by the Treaty of Lausanne in which there was no provision for a Kurdish State.

The result was that the Kurds, along with their Assyrian neighbors, were divided between Turkey, Iraq, Syria, and Iran.

== Conflicting promises and consequences ==
Many sources contend that Sykes–Picot conflicted with the McMahon–Hussein correspondence of 1915–1916 and that the publication of the agreement in November 1917 caused the resignation of Sir Henry McMahon. There were several points of difference, the most obvious being Iraq placed in the British red area and less obviously, the idea that British and French advisors would be in control of the area designated as being for an Arab state. Lastly, while the correspondence made no mention of Palestine, Haifa and Acre were to be British and the brown area (a reduced Palestine) internationalised.

== Modern politics ==
Leading up to the centenary of Sykes–Picot in 2016, great interest was generated among the media and academia concerning the long-term effects of the agreement. The agreement is frequently cited as having created "artificial" borders in the Middle East, "without any regard to ethnic or sectarian characteristics, [which] has resulted in endless conflict." The extent to which Sykes–Picot actually shaped the borders of the modern Middle East is disputed.

The Islamic State of Iraq and the Levant (ISIL) claimed one of the goals of its insurgency is to reverse the effects of the Sykes–Picot Agreement for the purpose of building a united Islamic State. "We don't recognise it and we will never recognise it. This is not the first border we will break, we will break other borders," a jihadist from the ISIL, Abu Safiyya, warned in a video titled The End of Sykes-Picot. ISIL's former leader, Abu Bakr al-Baghdadi, in a July 2014 speech at the Great Mosque of al-Nuri in Mosul, vowed that "this blessed advance will not stop until we hit the last nail in the coffin of the Sykes–Picot conspiracy". Former French Prime Minister Dominique de Villepin presented a similar geopolitical analysis in an editorial contribution for the French newspaper Le Monde.

In August 2025, American diplomat Tom Barrack stated in an interview with Mario Nawfal that Israel has no interest adhering to the agreement, calling the agreement as "meaningless", and claiming that Israel has the "capacity or the desire" to take over Lebanon and Syria.

== See also ==
- Anglo-Iraqi Treaty of 1922
- Balfour Declaration
- Durand Line
- Mandate for Palestine
- Mandate for Syria and the Lebanon
- Mandate for Mesopotamia
- Scramble for Africa
- Treaty of Kars

== Bibliography ==
=== Original correspondence ===
- Documents on British Foreign Policy, series I, vol. IV, pp. 241–251

=== Secondary sources ===
- Anghie, Antony T. (2016). "Introduction to Symposium on the Many Lives and Legacies of Sykes-Picot". AJIL Unbound. 110: 105–108. doi:10.1017/S2398772300002890. ISSN 2398-7723. JSTOR 27003189.
- James Barr (2012). A Line in the Sand: Britain, France and the Struggle That Shaped the Middle East. Simon & Schuster. ISBN 978-1-84739-457-6.
- Berdine, Michael D. (2018). Redrawing the Middle East: Sir Mark Sykes, Imperialism and the Sykes–Picot Agreement. I. B. Tauris. ISBN 978-1-78672-406-9.
- Brecher, F.W. (October 1993). "French policy toward the Levant 1914–18". Middle Eastern Studies. 29 (4): 641–663. doi:10.1080/00263209308700971. ISSN 0026-3206. JSTOR 4283597.
- Dodge, Toby (2016). "The Danger of Analogical Myths: Explaining the Power and Consequences of the Sykes-Picot Delusion". AJIL Unbound. 110: 132–136. doi:10.1017/S2398772300002944. ISSN 2398-7723.
- Donaldson, Megan (2016). "Textual Settlements: The Sykes–Picot Agreement and Secret Treaty-Making" (PDF). AJIL Unbound. 110: 127–131. doi:10.1017/S2398772300002932. ISSN 2398-7723.
- Fisher, John (1999). Curzon and British Imperialism in the Middle East, 1916–19. Psychology Press. pp. 317–. ISBN 978-0-7146-4875-0.
- Fitzgerald, Edward Peter (December 1994). "France's Middle Eastern Ambitions, the Sykes-Picot Negotiations, and the Oil Fields of Mosul, 1915-1918". The Journal of Modern History. 66 (4): 697–725. doi:10.1086/244937. ISSN 0022-2801. JSTOR 2125155. S2CID 144249048.
- Friedman, Isaiah (1992). The Question of Palestine: British–Jewish–Arab Relations, 1914–1918. Transaction Publishers. pp. 97–118. ISBN 978-1-4128-3868-9.
- Fromkin, David (1989). A Peace to End All Peace: The Fall of the Ottoman Empire and the Creation of the Modern Middle East. New York: H. Holt. ISBN 978-0-8050-6884-9.
- Gil-Har, Yitzhak (January 2000). "Boundaries delimitation: Palestine and Trans-Jordan". Middle Eastern Studies. 36 (1): 68–81. doi:10.1080/00263200008701297. ISSN 0026-3206. JSTOR 4284051.
- Huneidi, Sahar (2001). A Broken Trust: Sir Herbert Samuel, Zionism and the Palestinians. I. B. Tauris. p. 84. ISBN 978-1-86064-172-5.
- Hurewitz, J. C. (1979). The Middle East and North Africa in World Politics: A Documentary Record. British-French supremacy, 1914–1945. 2. Yale University Press. ISBN 978-0-300-02203-2.
- Jeffries, J.M.N. (1939). Palestine: the reality. Hyperion Press. ISBN 978-0-88355-327-5.
- Kattan, Victor (2009). From Coexistence to Conquest: International Law and the Origins of the Arab-Israeli Conflict, 1891–1949. Pluto Press. ISBN 978-0-7453-2579-8.
- Kedourie, Elie (1987). England and the Middle East: The Destruction of the Ottoman Empire, 1914-1921 (New ed.). Boulder (Colo.); San Francisco: Westview Press. ISBN 978-0-8133-0646-9.
- Kedourie, Elie (2014). In the Anglo-Arab Labyrinth: The McMahon-Husayn Correspondence and Its Interpretations 1914–1939. Routledge. ISBN 978-1-135-30842-1.
- Kitching, Paula (15 December 2015). "The Sykes-Picot agreement and lines in the sand". The Historical Association. No. 128. pp. 18–22.
- Lieshout, Robert H. (2016). Britain and the Arab Middle East: World War I and its Aftermath. I. B. Tauris. ISBN 978-1-78453-583-4.
- Ottaway, Marina (Fall 2015). "Learning from Sykes-Picot". WWIC Middle East Program Occasional Paper Series.
- Tanenbaum, Jan Karl (1978). "France and the Arab Middle East, 1914-1920". Transactions of the American Philosophical Society. 68 (7): 1–50. doi:10.2307/1006273. JSTOR 1006273.
- Vereté, Mayir [in Hebrew] (January 1970). "The Balfour Declaration and Its Makers". Middle Eastern Studies. 6 (1): 48–76. doi:10.1080/00263207008700138. ISSN 0026-3206. JSTOR 4282307.
- Erik Jan Zürcher (2004). Turkey: A Modern History. I. B. Tauris. pp. 143–145. ISBN 978-1-86064-958-5.
