= De Bunsen Committee =

British Desiderata re Ottoman Empire

The De Bunsen Committee was the first committee established by the British government to determine its policy toward the Ottoman Empire during and following World War I. The committee was established on 8 April 1915 by British Prime Minister H. H. Asquith, and was headed by Maurice de Bunsen. The committee submitted its report on 30 June 1915.

The committee was established in response to a French initiative, to consider the nature of British objectives in Turkey and Asia in the event of a successful conclusion of the war. The committee's report provided the guidelines for negotiations with France, Italy, and Russia regarding the partitioning of the Ottoman Empire.

== Members ==
The members of the committee were as follows:

- Sir Maurice de Bunsen, 1st Baronet, chairman
- Georges R. Clerk, representing the Foreign Office
- Thomas Holderness, representing the India Office
- Henry Jackson, representing the Admiralty
- Charles E. Callwell, representing the War Office
- Hubert Llewellyn Smith, representing the Board of Trade
- Mark Sykes, representing Lord Kitchener, the Secretary of State for War

The impact of Mark Sykes, who later negotiated the Sykes-Picot Agreement, on the committee was said to be "profound". He did not sign the final report having been dispatched on instructions of the War Office at the beginning of June to discuss the committee's findings with the British authorities in the Near and Middle East and at the same time to study the situation on the spot. He went to Athens, Gallipoli, Sofia, Cairo, Aden, Cairo a second time and then to India coming back to Basra in September and a third time to Cairo in November (where he was appraised of the McMahon–Hussein Correspondence) before returning home on 8 December and finally delivering his report to the War Committee on 16 December.

== Report ==
The De Bunsen committee considered four possible solutions: (1) partition, leaving only a small Ottoman state in Anatolia; (2) preservation subject to Great Power control zones of political and commercial influence; (3) preservation as an independent state in Asia; (4) creation of a decentralised, federal Ottoman state in Asia.

The committee's report, titled "Committee of Imperial Defence: Asiatic Turkey, Report of a Committee" was issued on 30 June 1915, and recommended the last option as the best solution for meeting the British Empire's defence needs.

Concerning Palestine it reported that it would be “...idle for His Majesty's Government to claim the retention of Palestine in their sphere. Palestine must be recognized as a country whose destiny must be the subject of special negotiations, in which both belligerents and neutrals are alike interested”. In case of the partition or zones of influence options then the committee defined a British sphere of influence that included Palestine while accepting that there were relevant French and Russian, as well as Islamic interests in Jerusalem and the Holy Places.

== See also ==
- British Mandate for Palestine
- British Mandate of Jordan
- British Mandate of Iraq
