= 1918 Anglo-French Modus Vivendi =

Modus vivendi agreement

The 1918 Anglo–French Modus Vivendi was a modus vivendi agreement signed on 30 September 1918 regarding the creation of the Occupied Enemy Territory Administration in the area of modern-day Syria, Jordan, Israel, Lebanon and Palestine. The agreement was first negotiated on 19 September 1918, and was built on the foundation of the previous Anglo-French agreement relating to the area, known as the 1916 Sykes-Picot agreement.

While the agreement was ostensibly focused on the French goal to take responsibility over their allotted areas of responsibility, now under Edmund Allenby’s military command, the British used the agreement to begin the revision of the Sykes-Picot allocations.

In practice, the agreement resulted in the creation of the three OETA territories: South (Palestine) with a British-led administration, West (the north Mediterranean coast including Lebanon), with a French-led administration, and East (inland Syria including Transjordan), with an Arab-led administration.

== The agreement ==
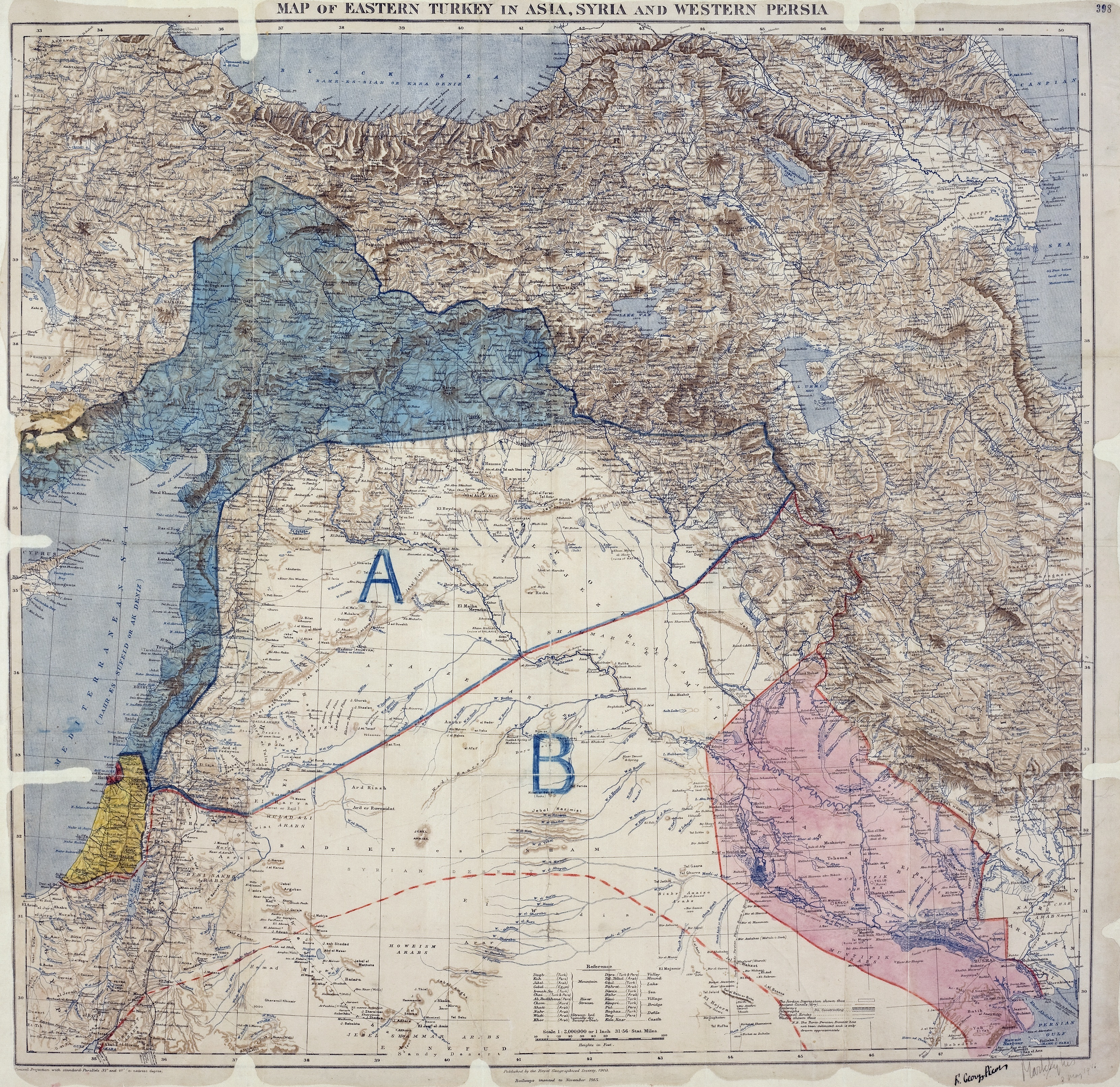
The region covered by the modus vivendi, as agreed in the 1916 Sykes–Picot Agreement

The key terms of the agreement were as follows; the map references related to the 1916 Sykes-Picot map:

In the areas of special French interest, as described in the Anglo–French Agreement of 1916, which are or may be occupied by the Allied forces of the Egyptian expeditionary force, the Commander- in-Chief will recognise the representative of the French government as his Chief Political Adviser. The functions of the Chief Political Adviser will be as follows:

1. Subject to the supreme authority of the Commander-in-Chief, the Chief Political Adviser will act as sole intermediary on political and administrative questions between the Commander- in-Chief and any Arab government or governments, permanent or provisional, which may be set up in Area ‘A’, and recognised under the terms of clause 1 of the Agreement of 1916.

2. At the request of the Commander-in-chief, and subject to his supreme authority, the Chief Political Adviser will be charged by the Commander- in-Chief with the establishment of such provisional administration in the towns of the Syrian littoral situated in the blue area, and in the blue area in general.

3. Subject to the approval of the Commander- in-Chief, the Chief Political Adviser will provide [...] Such European advisory staff and assistants as the Arab government or governments set up in Area ‘A’ may require under clause 1 of the Anglo–French Agreement of 1916 [...] Such personnel as may be necessary for civil duties in the littoral towns or other parts of the blue area.

== Bibliography ==
- Hurewitz, J. C. (1 June 1979). The Middle East and North Africa in World Politics: A Documentary Record – British-French Supremacy, 1914–1945. Yale University Press. ISBN 978-0-300-02203-2.
- Lieshout, Robert H. (2016). Britain and the Arab Middle East: World War I and its Aftermath. I.B.Tauris. ISBN 978-1-78453-583-4.
- Paris, Timothy J. (2003). Britain, the Hashemites and Arab Rule: The Sherifian Solution. Routledge. ISBN 978-1-135-77191-1.
