= David Fromkin =

American historian

- Born: August 27, 1932; Milwaukee, Wisconsin, U.S.
- Died: June 11, 2017 (aged 84); New York, New York
- Education: University of Chicago
- Scientific career
- Workplaces: Boston University; Pardee School of Global Studies

David Henry Fromkin (August 27, 1932 – June 11, 2017) was an American historian, best known for his interpretive account of the Middle East, A Peace to End All Peace (1989), in which he recounts the role European powers played between 1914 and 1922 in creating the modern Middle East. The book was a finalist for both the National Book Critics Circle Award and the Pulitzer Prize for General Nonfiction. Fromkin wrote seven books, ending in 2007 with The King and the Cowboy: Theodore Roosevelt and Edward the Seventh, Secret Partners.

== Life ==
Fromkin was born in Milwaukee, Wisconsin, on August 27, 1932.

He died on June 11, 2017, in New York City due to heart failure; he was 84.

== Career ==
A graduate of the University of Chicago and the University of Chicago Law School, he was Professor Emeritus of History and International Relations, and Law at the Pardee School of Global Studies at Boston University, where he was also the Director of The Frederick S. Pardee Center for the Study of the Long-Range Future.

Before his career as a historian, Fromkin was an attorney and political adviser. In the 1972 Democratic primary campaign, he served as a foreign-policy adviser to candidate Hubert Humphrey. As an attorney, he served as both prosecutor and defense counsel in the Army Judge Advocate General's Corps.

He retired as professor emeritus in 2013.

== Assessment ==
Noam Chomsky criticized Fromkin for his portrayal of the US-backed NATO intervention in the Kosovo War. Discussing Fromkin's book Kosovo Crossing: The Reality of American Intervention in the Balkans, Chomsky stated that Fromkin "asserts without argument that the U.S. and its allies acted out of 'altruism' and 'moral fervor' alone" in bombing Yugoslavia during the Kosovo war.

== Selected bibliography ==
External videos
- Booknotes interview with Fromkin on In the Time of the Americans, October 22, 1995, C-SPAN
- Presentation by Fromkin on The Way of the World, March 1, 1999, C-SPAN

- A Peace to End All Peace: Creating the Modern Middle East, 1914–1922 (1989) ISBN 0-8050-0857-8, ISBN 0-8050-6884-8 OCLC 53814831(paperback)
- “Britain, France, and the Diplomatic Agreements.” In The Creation of Iraq, 1914–1921, ed. Reeva Spector Simon and Eleanor H. Tejirian, 134–145. New York: Columbia University press, 2004.
- Europe's Last Summer: Who started the Great War in 1914? (2004) ISBN 0-375-41156-9, ISBN 0-375-72575-X (paperback)
- Kosovo Crossing: The Reality of American Intervention in the Balkans, New York, NY: Simon & Schuster. (2002) ISBN 9780684869537, ISBN 0-684-86953-5
- In the Time of the Americans: FDR, Truman, Eisenhower, Marshall, MacArthur, The Generation That Changed America's Role in the World (1995) ISBN 0-394-58901-7, ISBN 0-679-76728-2 (paperback)
- The Independence of Nations (1981)
- The Importance of T. E. Lawrence. From The New Criterion Vol. 10, No. 1, September 1991.
- The Question of Government: An Inquiry into the Breakdown of Modern Political Systems (1975)
- "The King and the Cowboy: Theodore Roosevelt and Edward the Seventh, Secret Partners" (2007)
- The Way of the World (1998)
