= A Peace to End All Peace =

Book by David Fromkin

- First US edition
- Author: David Fromkin
- Language: English
- Genre: Middle East, History
- Publisher: Henry Holt (US); Andre Deutsch (UK)
- Publication date: 1989
- Publication place: United States
- Media type: Print (Paperback)
- Pages: 635
- ISBN: 0-8050-6884-8
- OCLC: 53814831
- LC Class: DS63.2.G7 F76 2001

A Peace to End All Peace: The Fall of the Ottoman Empire and the Creation of the Modern Middle East (also subtitled Creating the Modern Middle East, 1914–1922) is a 1989 history book written by Pulitzer Prize for General Nonfiction finalist David Fromkin, which describes the events leading to the dissolution of the Ottoman Empire during World War I, and the drastic changes that took place in the Middle East as a result, which he believed led to a new world war that is still continuing. It has been widely praised. Richard Holbrooke wrote: “Without knowledge of its backstory, no policymaker will get the region right... Of the vast array of books on the region, none is more relevant than Fromkin’s sweeping epic, A Peace to End All Peace.” Wm. Roger Louis reviewed it in The New York Times, judging the book "excellent ... Readers will come away... not only enlightened but challenged." The Times of London described the book as “the truth and nothing but the truth.”
