= Agreement of Saint-Jean-de-Maurienne =

1917 agreement between France, Italy, and Great Britain

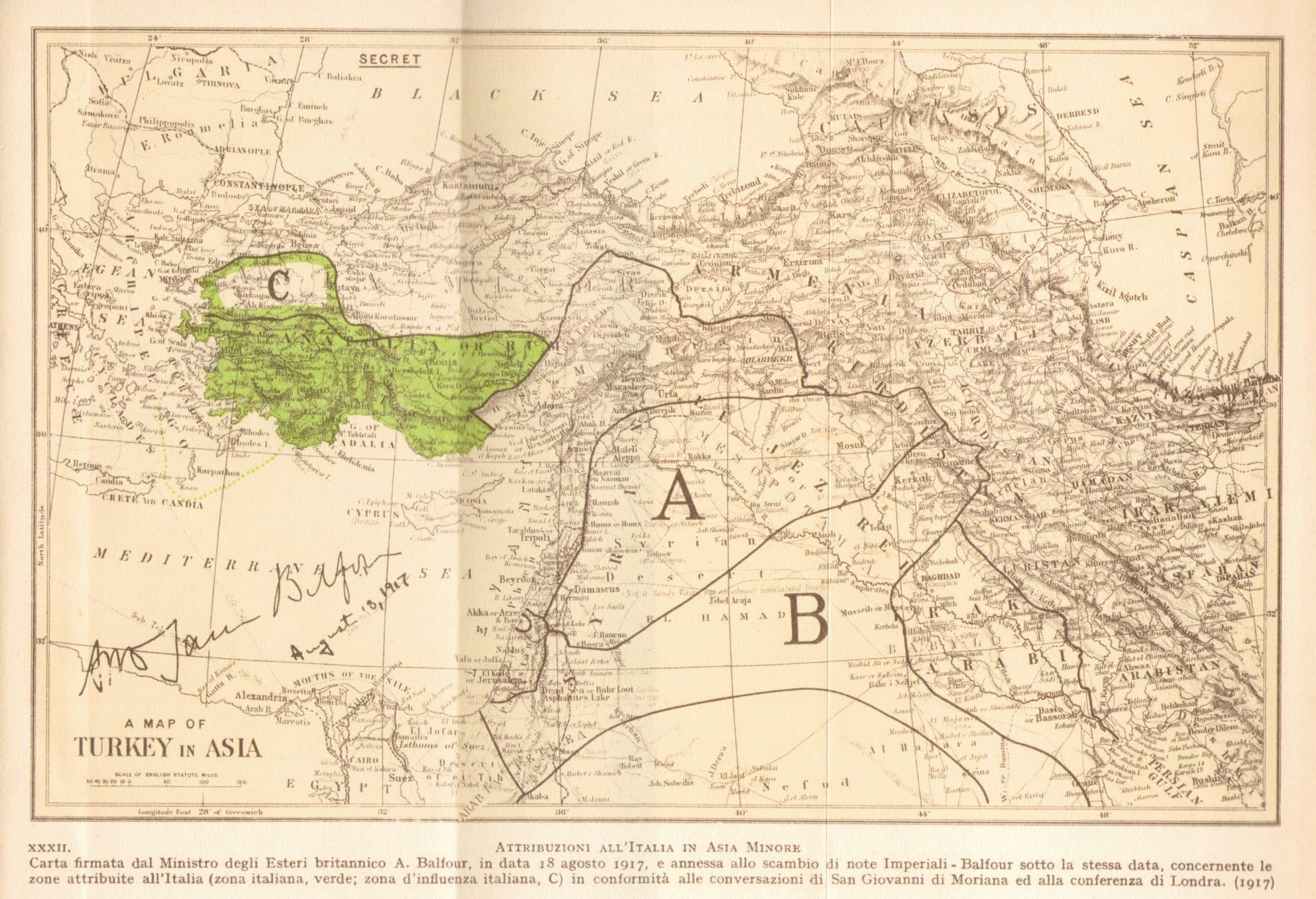
Map of the agreement, signed by Balfour in August 1917. The dotted green line in the Aegean Sea notes the Italian Islands of the Aegean, already under Italian control.

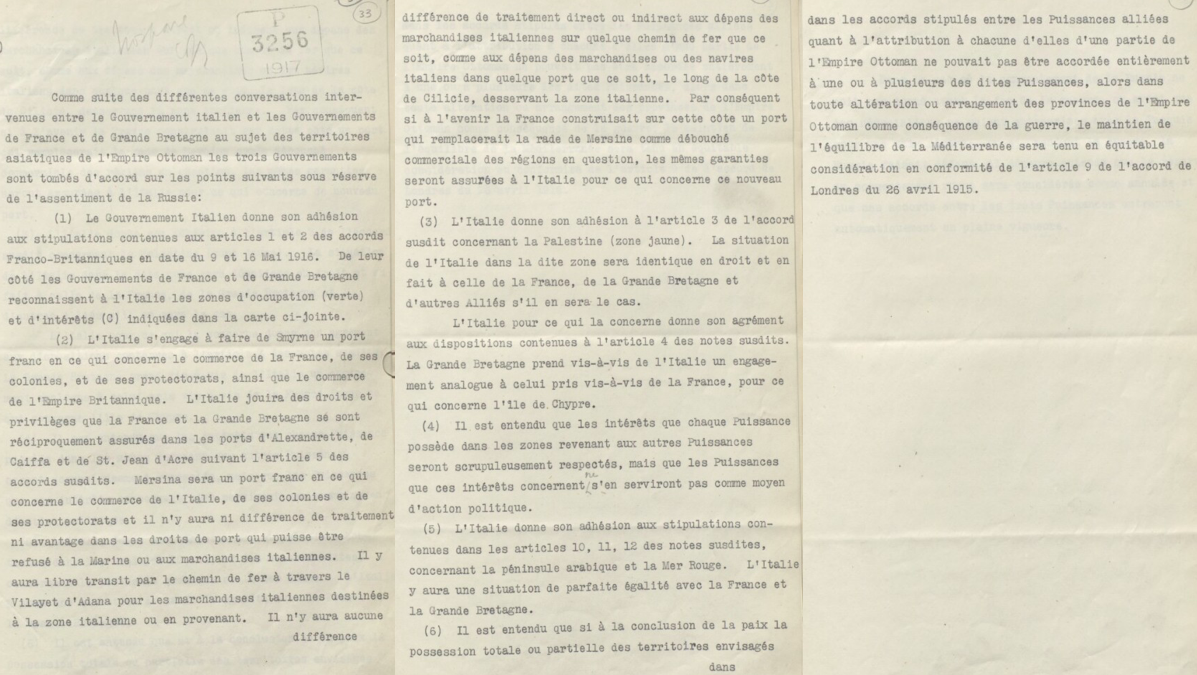
Agreement of Saint-Jean-de-Maurienne; version ratified between the Allies, subject to the consent of Russia (which was never achieved), in August 1917

The Agreement of St.-Jean-de-Maurienne was an agreement between France, Italy and Great Britain, which emanated from a conference in a railway car at Saint-Jean-de-Maurienne on 19 April 1917 and signed by the allies between 18 August and 26 September 1917.

The 19 April meeting was attended by British and French Prime Ministers, David Lloyd George and Alexandre Ribot, and the Italian Prime Minister and Foreign Minister, Paolo Boselli and Sidney Sonnino.

It was intended as a tentative agreement to settle the Italian Middle Eastern interest, specifically Article 9 of the Treaty of London (1915). The agreement was needed by the allies to secure the position of Italian forces in the Middle East. The goal was to balance the military power drops at the Middle Eastern theatre of World War I as Russian (Tsarist) forces were pulling out of the Caucasus Campaign, even though they were replaced with what would be named Democratic Republic of Armenian forces. Russia was not represented in this agreement as the Tsarist regime was in a state of collapse (see Russian Revolution of 1917). However, the lack of Russian consent to the Saint-Jean-de-Maurienne agreement was used by the British at the 1919 Paris Peace Conference to invalidate it, a position that greatly incensed the Italian government.

== Background ==
The representatives of Great Britain, France, Russia and Italy met in London in 1915 to sign an agreement providing for Italy’s entrance to the First World War. Italy’s part in the Middle East was left unsettled; the agreement stated that if the Ottoman Empire was partitioned, Italy should receive a "just share" in the Antalya district. The borders of the occupation were to be decided at a later time.

== 19 April meeting ==
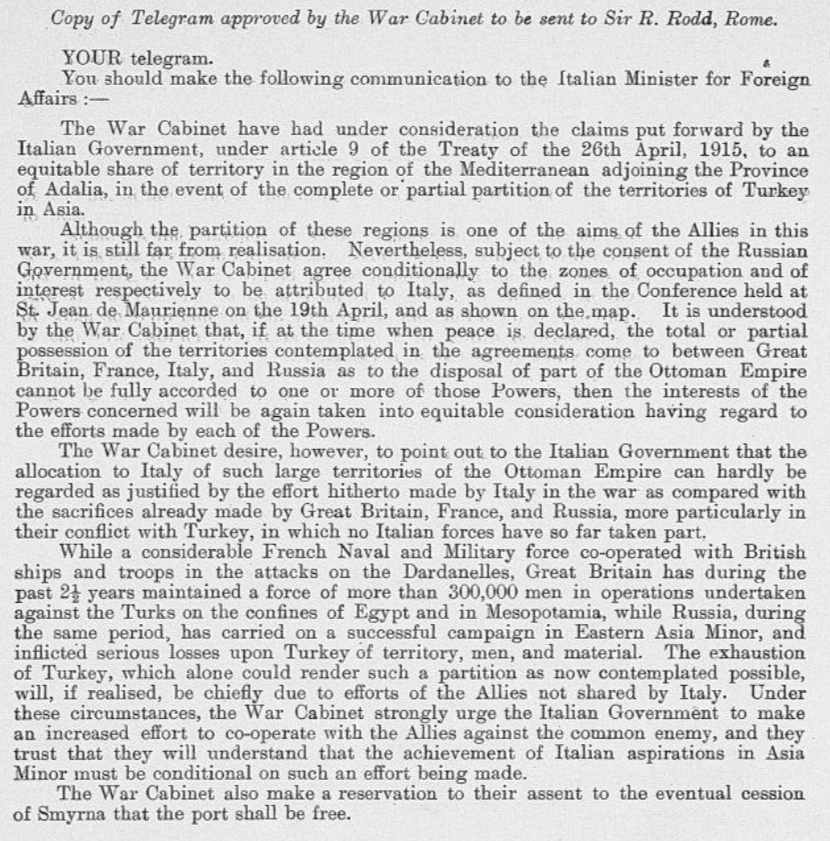
Six days after the meeting, the British War Cabinet approved a note to be sent to the Italians stating that they "agree conditionally" to the proposal made at the conference, whilst pointing out that the Italian contribution to the war was yet to justify it. The French government sent a similar communication on 10 May.

The 19 April meeting discussed the concept of Italian influence after the war. It was clear to the Italians that the area allotted to them may not be easily given up by the Turkish Empire, such that the British Prime Minister proposed a vague formula for post-war adjustment should the actual post-war allocation not appear to be balanced. The minutes of the meeting are below:

M. Ribot made objections regarding the assignment of Mersina and Adana to Italy, but admitted facilities should be granted to commerce of the Interior in the direction of Mersina as in the case of Alexandretta and Haifa. The Italian zone will commence at a point to be determined west of Mersina.

Baron Sonnino asked for the inclusion in Italian zone of occupation of everything which so figures on Mr. Balfour's map. He asked, besides, that the northern part of the vilayet of Smyrna be also included. Mr. Lloyd George and M. Ribot undertake to submit this claim to their Governments.

It was agreed that the interests of the other Powers already established in the different zones shall he scrupulously respected, but that the Powers concerned in these interests shall not make use of them as a means of political action.

An exchange of views took place as to the situation which might result for the Allied Powers at the moment of peace with respect to the Ottoman Empire. After the discussion, Mr Lloyd George made the following proposal, which was accepted: —

It is agreed that if, at the time when peace is made, the total or partial possession of territories contemplated in the agreements concluded between France, Great Britain, Italy and Russia as regards attribution to them of a part of the Ottoman Empire, could not be granted entirely to one or several of the Powers in question, then the interests of those Powers would he taken afresh into equitable consideration

In a general way. the Ministers undertook to recommend the above decisions to their Governments.

== Subsequent discussions ==
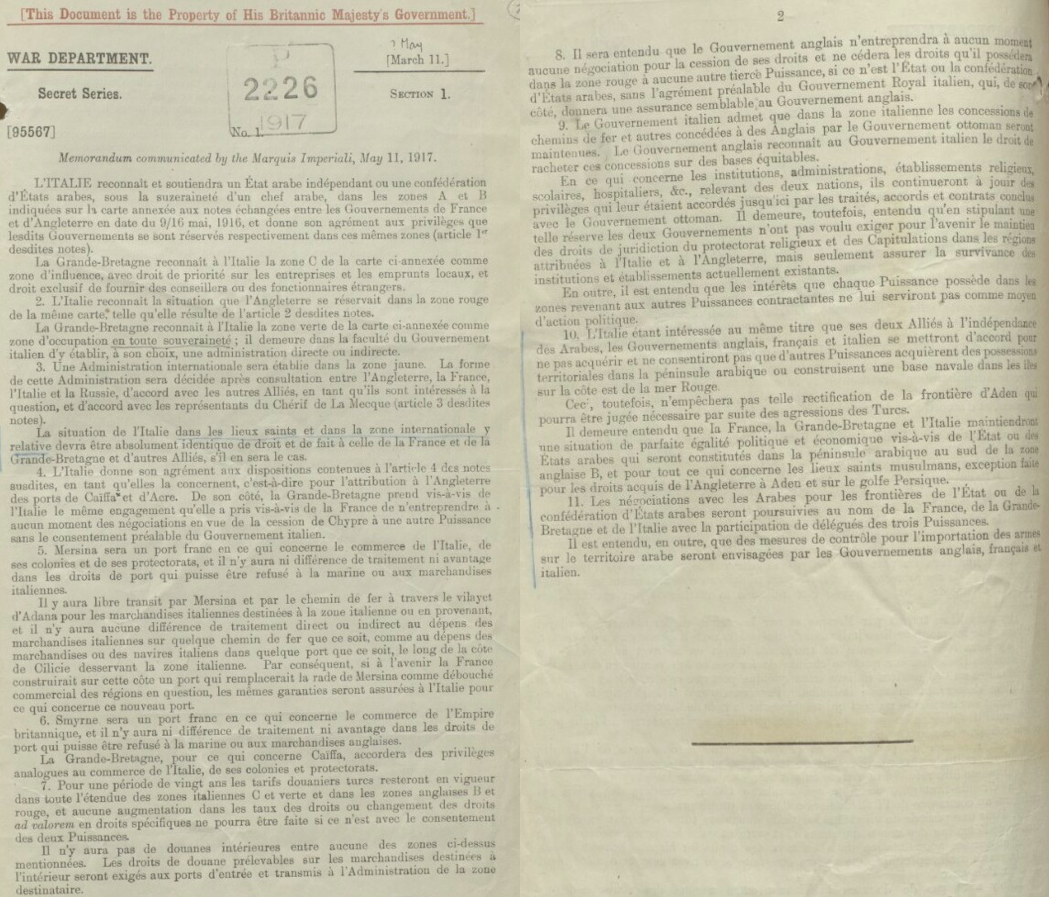
Guglielmo Imperiali, 11 May 1917

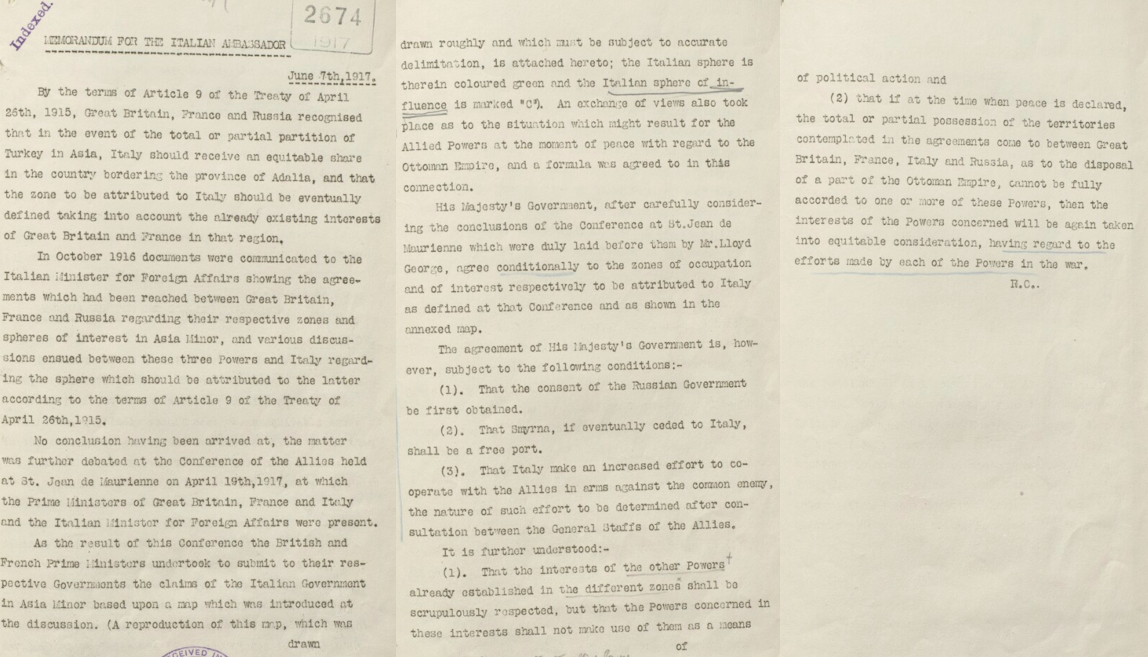
Robert Cecil, 7 June 1917

British and Italian memorandums exchanged during the development of the agreement

The British and French governments added a number of conditions to the proposed Italian sphere of influence which had not been discussed between the prime ministers at the 19 April conference. The Italian Foreign Minister Sonnino protested that the Sykes Picot agreement did not include such conditions. These discussions continued until a series of discussions in early August and a final meeting of the prime ministers on 7 August.

The full chronology of events in the summer of 1917 is not clear to historians.

== Application ==
Under its terms France would be allotted the Adana region, while Italy would receive the remainder of southwestern Anatolia, including İzmir (Smyrna). In 1919, the Greek prime minister, Eleuthérios Venizélos, by obtaining the permission of the Paris Peace Conference for Greece to occupy İzmir, overrode the provisions of the agreement despite Italian opposition.
