= Iraq–Turkey border =

International border

Iraq-Turkey border الحدود العراقية التركية (Arabic) Irak–Türkiye sınırı (Turkish) سنووری عێراق و تورکیا (Kurdish)
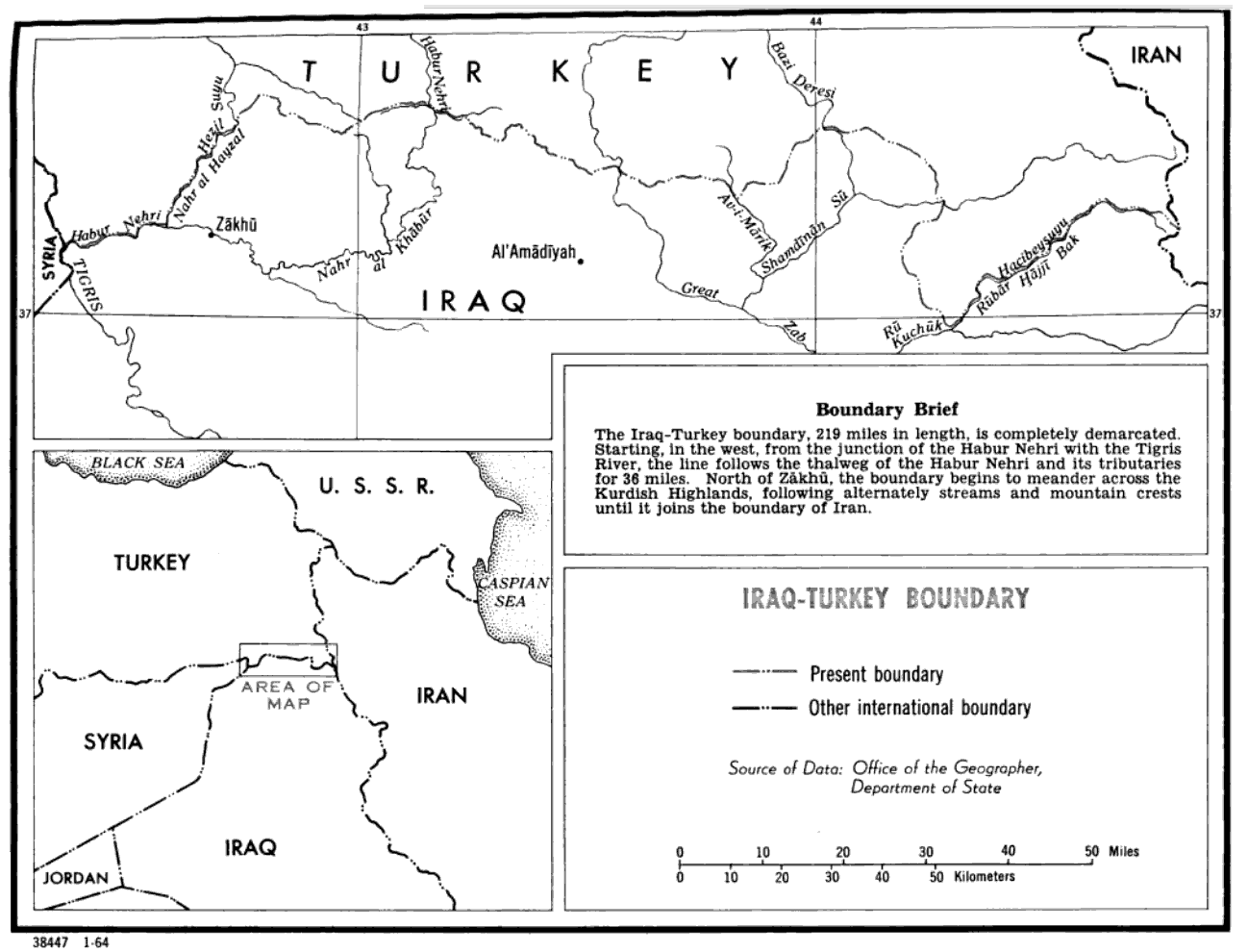
- Map of the Iraq–Turkey border

Characteristics
- Entities: Iraq Turkey
- Length: 331 km (206 mi)

History
- Established: 1926 (Treaty of Ankara (1926)); To establish the border between Iraq and Turkey
- Current shape: Active; Border between Iraq and Turkey
- Treaties: Treaty of Ankara (1926)
- Notes: The border region is mountainous and predominantly populated by Kurds on both sides. Tensions related to Kurdish insurgency persist.

The Iraq–Turkey border is 331 km (206 mi) in length and runs from the tripoint with Syria in the west to the tripoint with Iran in the east. Should Turkey, which is a candidate for EU membership, accede to the EU, Iraq will be a border neighbor with the European Union.

== Description ==
The border starts in the west at the tripoint with Syria at the confluence of Tigris river and Little Khabur river. It then follows the latter river eastwards, and then the Hezil Suyu river to the north-east. The border then turns eastwards overland via series of irregular lines over mountain crests and small streams, eventually turning southwards to connect to the Hajji Bak (Hacibey Suyu) river. It then follows this river north-eastwards to the Iranian tripoint. The border region is extremely mountainous and is populated almost exclusively by Kurds on both sides.

== History ==
At the start of the 20th century the Ottoman Empire controlled what is now Turkey and Iraq. During the First World War an Arab Revolt, supported by Britain, succeeded in removing the Ottomans from most of the Middle East. As a result of the secret 1916 Anglo-French Sykes–Picot Agreement Britain gained control of the Ottoman Iraqi Vilayets of Mosul, Baghdad and Basra, which it organised into the mandate of Iraq in 1920.

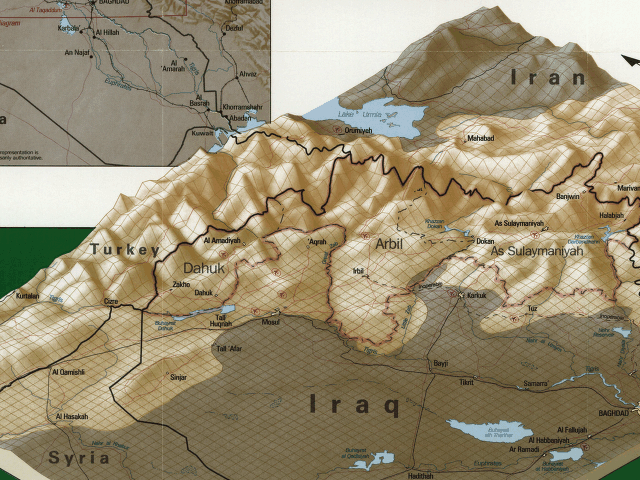
Topographic map of the border region

By the 1920 Treaty of Sèvres Anatolian Turkey was to be partitioned, with the areas north of the Mosul Vilayet to be included within an autonomous or independent Kurdish state. Turkish nationalists were outraged at the treaty, contributing to the outbreak the Turkish War of Independence; the Turkish success in this conflict rendered Sèvres obsolete. By the 1923 Treaty of Lausanne Turkey's independence was recognised and a far more generous territorial settlement was agreed upon, albeit at the cost of Turkey formally renouncing any claim to Arab lands. As a provisional measure, the former northern border the Mosul Vilayet was to serve as a frontier between British-controlled Iraq and Turkey, with a more precise delimitation to be agreed upon later.

British and Turkish officials met in 1924 but were unable to determine a mutually satisfactory border, and the matter was referred to the League of Nations. In October 1925 the League proposed a border (the ‘Brussels line’) that was essentially the same as that of the northern limits of the old Mosul Vilayet. After further deliberations, the League formally recommend in July 1925 that the Brussels line be utilised, a view endorsed by the Permanent Court of International Justice at the Hague in November 1925. On 5 June 1926 Britain and Turkey signed the Treaty of Ankara, by which both states recognised the Brussels line (with some minor modifications) as the frontier. The border was then demarcated on the ground in 1927.

Generally cordial, relations between Iraq and Turkey became strained following the Gulf War (1990–91); this resulted in an autonomous Kurdish area being established in northern Iraq which provided sanctuary for Kurdish rebels operating in southeast Turkey. Since then Turkey has conducted numerous military incursions into the autonomous Kurdistan Region across the border in a bid to counter what it sees as Kurdish terrorism.

== Crossings ==
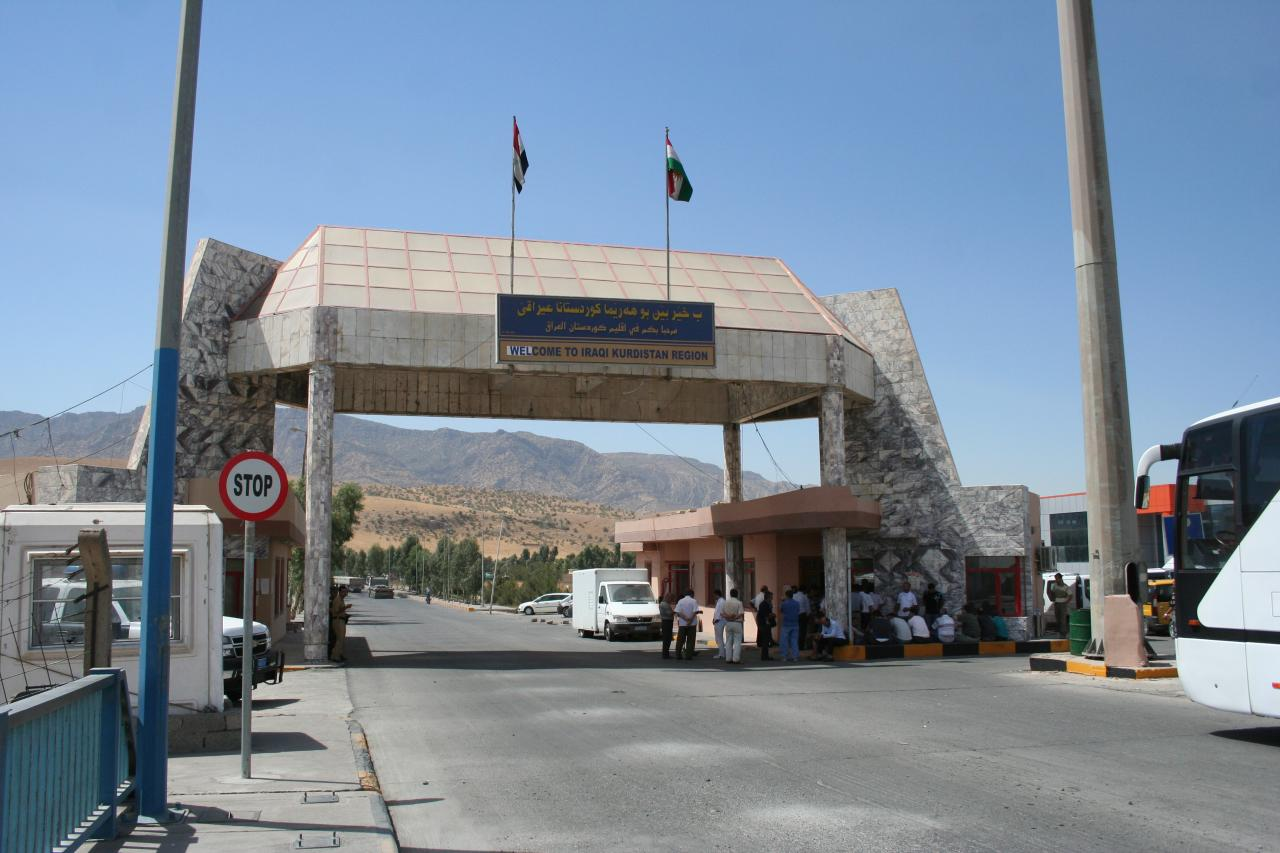
The border crossing at Ibrahim Khalil

There are three crossings along the entire border, two for vehicular traffic and one for vehicular and rail traffic. The busiest of three, Habur (Ibrahim Khalil), is among the busiest border checkpoints in the world.

(Turkey) Turkish checkpoint	Province	(Iraq) Iraqi checkpoint	Province	Opened	Route in Turkey	Route in Iraq	Status
Habur	Şırnak	Zakho	Duhok	18 July 1969			Open
Gülyazı	Şırnak	?	?	24 January 2012	?	?	Closed
Şemdinli-Derecik	Hakkâri	?	?	14 February 2011	?	?	Closed
Çukurca-Üzümlü	Hakkâri	Sar Zeri	Erbil	7 May 2015	?	?	Open

== See also ==
- Turkish occupation of Iraqi Kurdistan
- Iraq–Turkey relations
