= Treaty of Ankara (1926) =

1926 treaty between Turkey, United Kingdom and Iraq

Treaty of Ankara (1926), commonly known as the Frontier Treaty of 1926
Treaty between the United Kingdom and Iraq and Turkey regarding the settlement of the frontier between Turkey and Iraq, together with notes exchanged.
- Type: Peace treaty
- Context: Turkish-Iraq border dispute and Turkish sphere of influence in northern Iraq.
- Signed: 5 June 1926
- Location: Ankara
- Signatories: (Turkey) Tevfik Rüştü Aras (United Kingdom) Ronald Lindsay (Iraq) Nuri al-Said
- Parties: Turkey United Kingdom; Iraq
- Languages: Turkish, English

The Treaty of Ankara (1926), also known as the Frontier Treaty of 1926 (Turkish: Ankara Antlaşması), was signed on 5 June 1926 in Ankara by Turkey, the United Kingdom and Mandatory Iraq. The treaty aimed to solve the so-called "Mosul Question" by determining a mutually satisfactory border between Turkey and Iraq and to regulate their neighbourly relations. One important aspect of the treaty was that Turkey would have the right to engage in militarily conflict in the border region in the event of it being destabilised. This sphere of influence which is beyond Turkey's modern boundaries mainly covers the northern part of Iraq, notably the Mosul and Kirkuk region.

== Terms ==
- Mosul Province would belong to Iraq.
- The "Brussel Line", as adopted previously on 29 October 1924 the provisional border, would act as the border between Turkey and Iraq.
- 10% of the royalty due the Iraq government from oil revenues from Mosul would be given to Turkey for 25 years.
- Turkey had received the payment for 4 years and would give up on the remaining 21 years of payment in favour of a payment of £500,000 sterling from the United Kingdom.

== Aftermath ==
"After the 1926 Treaty, relations between Turkey and Iraq gradually started to improve. In 1928, each side opened legations in the other's capitals and both countries presented their credentials. King Faisal and his ministers made a state visit to the Turkish capital in July 1931, and early in 1932, The Turco-Iraqi Treaties of Residence, Commerce, and Extradition was signed. Although, The Treaty of Bilateral Commerce and Friendship was signed between the Turkish and Iraqi governments in 1932, it was not approved by Britain, which shows the continuation of British control over Iraqi foreign policy after the mandate. In 1937, a non-aggression Treaty was signed with Iraq, called the Saadabad Pact."

== See also ==
- Iraq–Turkey relations
- Treaty of Saadabad - a five-year non-aggression pact signed between Turkey, Iraq, Iran and Afghanistan on 8 July 1937.
