= Iraq–Turkey relations =

- Turkey: Iraq

Diplomatic mission
- Embassy of Turkey in Baghdad: Embassy of Iraq in Ankara

Envoy
- Ali Rıza Güney: Majid Al-Lajmawi

Iraq–Turkey relations are foreign relations between Iraq and Turkey. From late 2011, relations between the two countries have undergone strained turbulence. The two countries share historical and cultural heritages.

Turkey has an embassy in Baghdad, and a consulate general in Mosul, Basra and Erbil. While Iraq has an embassy in Ankara and consulate general in Istanbul and Gaziantep. The ambassador of Iraq in Ankara, Turkey, is Mr. Abdul Amir Kamil Abi Tabikh, who has been the representative of Iraq since 5 March 2009. The Iraqi mission in Turkey includes a defense attaché and commerce office in Ankara, and a general consulate in Istanbul. The Ambassador of Turkey in Baghdad, Iraq, is Derya Kanbay, who has been in office since 20 January 2007. The Turkish Embassy in Baghdad also possesses a commerce office.

== Political relations in chronological order ==
To outline the development of Iraq–Turkey relations, this section divides their interaction into key historical stages. Both states emerged in the aftermath of the First World War: Iraq was established under British administration and later as a League of Nations mandate, while Turkey emerged from the dissolution of the Ottoman Empire. Although the Republic of Turkey gained international recognition with the Treaty of Lausanne in 1923, the Ankara-based Grand National Assembly had exercised effective political authority since 1920.

=== World War I and emergence of two states ===
Before World War I, Iraq was part of the Ottoman Empire. While it was administered through multiple provinces, Ottoman authorities and official correspondence treated these lands as a single regional unit, describing it as "the Iraq region” (Hıtta-i Irakiyye). Under Ottoman administrative reforms such as the Land Law of 1858 and Vilayet Law of 1864, Ottoman Iraq was administered through the vilayets of Basra, Baghdad, and Mosul. After World War I, these provinces were incorporated into the modern Iraqi state under British administration.

Following the Iraqi uprising The Ottoman Empire lost World War I and signed the Armistice of Moudros with the Allies on 30 October 1918. According to this armistice, the Ottoman Empire's southern border wasn't clarified. Article 16 of the armistice required Ottoman forces in Iraq, including formations such as the Iraq Area Command (Irak ve Havalisi Genel Komutanlığı), to surrender to the Allies. However, the armistice did not clearly define Iraq’s borders. British forces occupied Mosul 16 days later (15 November 1918), a move later contested by Turkish authorities, and the region’s status became the basis of the Mosul Question.

The border question surrounding the Mosul province was one of the main disputes in early Iraq–Turkey relations. At its final meeting on 12 January 1920, the Ottoman Parliament in Istanbul adopted the National Pact, which outlined the territorial claims of the emerging Turkish nationalist movement. After the dissolution of the Ottoman Parliament, the Ankara-based Grand National Assembly continued to use the National Pact as a reference point during the Turkish War of Independence. Turkish nationalists argued that territories with a Muslim majority, including parts of the former Mosul Vilayet, should remain within the future Turkish state, while the status of Arab-majority areas should be determined by referendum. Turkish officials also claimed to represent both Turks and Kurds within this framework.

In 1923, the Lausanne Conference was held in Switzerland to settle issues following the Turkish War of Independence. The status of Mosul was one of the major unresolved questions. Britain supported including Mosul within the British Mandate of Iraq, while Turkey argued that Mosul should be part of Turkey, citing demographic and strategic considerations. The conference did not resolve the dispute, and Article 3 of the Treaty of Lausanne provided that the Turkey–Iraq frontier would be determined through negotiations within nine months; if no agreement was reached, the matter would be referred to the League of Nations.

After the Lausanne Conference, negotiations over the status of Mosul continued between Turkey and Great Britain, which administered Iraq under a League of Nations mandate. The Haliç (Golden Horn) Conference was held on 19 May 1924 but failed to produce an agreement, and the dispute was subsequently referred to the League of Nations. The League established a commission to examine the issue, and in December 1925 it decided that Mosul would remain part of Iraq. The League’s decision was controversial and was debated by the parties involved. During this period, Turkey's diplomatic position was also affected by the Sheikh Said rebellion, which undermined Ankara’s claim to represent Kurdish populations in the disputed region. Under the eventual settlement, Turkey received a 10% share of Mosul’s oil revenues for 25 years, although disagreements later emerged over the total sums paid and outstanding claims.

By 1923, Turkey’s sovereignty had been internationally recognised, while Iraq came under British mandate administration in 1920. Until Iraq’s independence in 1932, Iraq–Turkey relations were shaped in part by British influence and regional strategic interests.

=== 1932–1958: the Era of Pacts ===
During the 1930s, Turkey-Iraq relations were at their most cordial, with both the Hashemite King Ghazi (1912–1939) of Iraq and Kemal Atatürk (1881–1938), the founder of the modern Turkish state and its leader since 1923, continuing to maintain close relations with the British. From the independence of Iraq in 1932 to the republican revolution in 1958, the most significant events in Iraq–Turkey relations were the regional pacts: the Saadabad Pact and the Baghdad Pact. Turkey had two defence-military pacts between Middle Eastern countries in this era, and Iraq was the only Arab country in both of the pacts. In light of this knowledge it can be claimed that during this era Turkey and Iraq had a close, cooperative relationship.

==== The Saadabad Pact ====
The Treaty of Saadabad was signed between Iran, Iraq, Afghanistan, and Turkey on 8 July 1937 in the Saadabad Palace of Iran. More than a defence pact, it was a nonaggression and amity pact. There were two major reasons leading the signing of this pact: to solve the border disputes between the members of the pact, and to express the independence of each state in the international arena. The second reason was especially important for Iraq. Except for Turkey, for the rest of the countries this was the first international organization of which they were founders. The 7th article of the pact was the major article between Turkey and Iraq. According to this article, each member of this pact accepts to avert the armed groups within their territory which are a threat to other member states. In other words, it was a way of ensuring that neither Iran nor Iraq would give any sustenance to Kurdish rebels on Turkish territory or vice versa. By the start of World War II, this pact lost its meaning, except for this article. The last summit of the Saadabad Pact was in 1939, and later the pact actually disappeared.

==== The Baghdad Pact ====
After World War II, international relations had changed not only in the Middle East but also globally. Iraq became one of the founders of the Arab League in 1945. This league was founded in order to provide a forum for Arab states, and leaving the door open for a possible future federation. First of all, the founding of Israel has radically changed the politics in the Middle East. Iraq took part in the first Arab-Israeli war in 1948 by sending 18.000 troops to defend the Jenin–Nablus–Tulkaram region. This war brought Arab countries together and promoted Arab nationalism and anti-Western ideologies in the region. As a result of pan-Arabism, in the early 1950s, Za'im in Syria examined the possibility of a union between Syria and Iraq. However, first Iraq discouraged Syria's aim, and later it became a remote possibility after the coup d'état in Damascus.

Turkey opted to look in the other direction, being a part of the Western states and, after its accession to the North Atlantic Treaty Organization in 1952, placing itself firmly in the sphere of Western world. For Western countries, Turkey's strategic position was important. Turkey was an unsinkable aircraft carrier. At the same time Turkey could protect itself from the Soviet threat and modernize its army under the tutelage of NATO. These mutual benefits made Turkey a part of NATO. However, Turkey's recognition of Israel in 1948, and later its support of Western interests in the Middle East (e.g. Suez Canal Crisis) negatively affected its relations with the Middle Eastern countries.

The Baghdad Pact emerged in this atmosphere, with Arab countries and Turkey going different directions. Different foci in their extended foreign relations, however, did not preclude Iraq and Turkey from cooperating in common areas of interest. The Baghdad Pact is the evidence of the cooperation between two countries. On 24 February 1954, Iraq and Turkey signed a mutual-defense pact intended to contain the growth of Soviet influence in the region. Later, in 1955, Iran, Pakistan, and Britain had joined the pact. Turkey's, and also Iraq's, aim was to make other Arabic countries members of the pact. However, this aim failed. First of all, Britain's membership to the pact affected Arab countries negatively. Then, Israel was a more important threat to Arab countries than the Soviet Union. Nasserism and Arab socialism were spread among the Arab countries, and more than socialism, imperialism was seen as an enemy.

The Suez Canal Crisis of 1956 affected the pact negatively. Iraq as an Arab member of the pact could not stay neutral in the Suez Crisis. As a result, Iraq excluded Britain from the meetings of the Baghdad Pact and the King of Iraq joined the Arab summit in Beirut in a show of pan-Arab solidarity after the Suez Crisis. Despite the existence of those problems, Iraq was the only Arab member of the Baghdad Pact and tried to create a balance between Turkey, Western countries, and Arab countries.

This experiment ended when Iraq found itself with a new military government and withdrew from the agreement on 14 July 1958, one day before the Baghdad Pact summit in Turkey. At the summit, the situation in Iraq was discussed, and the members of the pact sent a message to the United States to step in on the situation in Iraq. Turkey was more aggressive than the other members of the pact and started to discuss a military intervention. However, the US did not want to take that risk and stopped Turkey. Then, on 31 July 1958, Turkey recognized the new government in Iraq and the tension in Turkey-Iraq relations decreased gradually.

The Baghdad Pact was transformed into CENTO and survived until the Iranian Revolution in 1979.

=== 1958–1990 ===
Iraqi regime and its foreign politics changed after the coup d'état in 1958. As well as Iraq, Turkey had undergone a coup d'état in 1960. The army took control of the government, prepared and constituted a new, more democratic, constitution, then re-established the democratic process again. Turkey's relations with other Middle Eastern countries affected its relations with Iraq during the 40s and 50s. After the coup d'état, Turkish foreign policy shifted into a new era, which is not strictly pro-Western and is extremely dominated by NATO. Turkey considered Middle Eastern countries' concerns in its foreign policy making in this era and had better relations with the Middle Eastern countries. In 1976, the Turkish president Fahri Korutürk visited Baghdad.

==== Petrol trade ====
Turkey's new foreign policy strategy during the 60s and 70s showed its benefits during the oil crisis of 1973. OPEC countries declared that Turkey's oil supply would not be limited. Moreover, in August 1973 a petroleum pipeline project between Turkey and Iraq was started, Kirkuk–Yumurtalık, and the project became real on 3 January 1977. The pipeline was supplying 2/3 of Turkey's petrol demand.

==== Water dispute ====
The issue of water rights became a contention for the two countries beginning in the 1960s, when Turkey implemented a public-works project (GAP project) aimed at harvesting the water from the Tigris and Euphrates rivers through the construction of 22 dams, for irrigation and hydroelectric energy purposes. Although the water dispute between Turkey and Syria was more problematic, the GAP project was also perceived as a threat by Iraq. The tension between Turkey and Iraq about the issue was increased by the effect of Syria and Turkey's participation in the UN embargo against Iraq, after the Gulf War. However, the issue had never become as significant as the water dispute between Turkey and Syria.

The 2008 drought in Iraq sparked new negotiations between Iraq and Turkey over trans-boundary river flows. Although the drought affected Turkey, Syria, and Iran as well, Iraq complained regularly about reduced water flows. Iraq particularly complained about the Euphrates because of the large amount of dams on the river. Turkey agreed to increase the flow several times, beyond their means, in order to supply Iraq with extra water. Iraq has seen significant declines in water storage and crop yields because of the drought. To make matters worse, Iraq's water infrastructure has suffered from years of conflict and neglect.

In 2008, Turkey, Iraq, and Syria agreed to restart the Joint Trilateral Committee on water for the three nations to better manage water resources. Turkey, Iraq, and Syria signed a memorandum of understanding on 3 September 2009 in order to strengthen communication within the Tigris–Euphrates Basin and develop joint water flow monitoring stations. On 19 September 2009, Turkey formally agreed to increase the flow of the Euphrates to 450 to 500 cm until 20 October 2009. In exchange, Iraq agreed to trade petroleum with Turkey and help curb terrorist activity in their border region. One of Turkey's last large GAP dams on the Tigris, the Ilısu Dam is strongly opposed by Iraq and is the source of political strife.

==== Iran–Iraq War and Turkey ====
The establishment of military-backed regimes in Turkey and Iraq by 1980 helped strengthen relations on several core issues, as both governments supported secularist and anti-radical policies, stable borders, and closer ties with the West, needed by Iraq for its conflict with Iran and by Turkey in its desire to join the European Union. During the Iran–Iraq war, Turkey stayed neutral officially and preserved political and economical relations with both countries. However, with the whole Western world, indirectly Turkey supported Iraq during the Iran-Iraq war. While Turkey was paying for the petrol with cash, Iraq was buying goods from Turkey by credit loaned from Turkey. That means that Turkey financially supported Iraq during the 1980s.

=== 1990–2003: First Gulf War and after ===
Following the relatively stabilized era of 1960 to 1990, the Iraqi invasion of Kuwait on 2 August 1990 radically changed Turkey-Iraq relations. After UN SC Resolution 665, Turkey allowed United Nations forces to fly missions from its air bases. The allied coalition achieved its objective and had neither a mandate nor much desire to press on into Iraq itself. A ceasefire agreement was signed at Safwan on 28 February 1991. However, after the cease fire, both Shiites in the south and Kurds in the north of Iraq had risen in revolt. Kurdish forces captured Kirkuk on 19 March 1991 but Republican Guards of Iraq re-captured the city and hundreds of thousands of Kurds escaped to the Iranian and Turkish borders as relatively safe places. Following that incident, UN SC Resolution 688 was passed, which called on Iraq to end its repression of its own population and paved the way for the creation by the coalition powers of a safe haven north of the 36th parallel in Iraq (just south of Erbil).

During the lack of authority in Iraq, Turkey's relation with Iraq was in a unique situation. The central government in Baghdad had no power in northern Iraq but Turkey's core issue about Iraq was in northern Iraq—Iraqi Kurdistan. So, unwillingly, the Turkish government created political relations with Iraqi Kurds, Talabani, and Barzani. An independent Kurdistan and division of Iraq's integrity was also a threat to the Turkish government. So, while Turkey was establishing political relations with Kurdish political leaders, it also signed a hot pursuit agreement with Saddam Hussein and made several military operations to Iraqi Kurdistan against camps of the Kurdistan Workers' Party (PKK). The 'Border Security and Cooperation Treaty' was signed between Turkey and Iraq in February 1983 and the first military operation was made in the same year by the Turkish Armed Forces. Then these military operations repeated several times during the 1980s, 1990s, and 2000s. Turkey launched 24 military operations to Iraq between 1983 and 2008. In this way, Turkey was practising its physical power in Iraq, threatening and balancing the Iraqi Kurdish political power as well as fighting against the PKK. Turkey found a pragmatic solution for its security problem in this unique situation but this situation was only a short-term period and it changed after the Second Gulf War and the invasion of Iraq.

=== 2003-post invasion ===
Turkey's relationship with Iraq has shifted to a new era after the invasion of Iraq. In this era, the integrity of Iraq is as important as PKK problem for Turkey-Iraq relations. The status of Kirkuk and Turkoman populations' rights are the subtitles of the disputes. Before the invasion, Turkey was called for the invasion by the U.S., but on 1 March 2003, Turkish parliament rejected being an active member of US-led coalition forces in Iraq. Such a decision of Turkish parliament was seen as both a reaction against the unilateral action of USA in the Middle East and the desire to keep Turkey away from the Iraq war. While Turkey was out of US plans on Iraq, Kurdish leaders of Iraq gained more power by allying with US during the war. Kurdistan Regional Government (KRG), which behaves like a semi-independent unit, eventually emerged, and its aggressive foreign policy disturbed Turkish foreign policy mechanisms. After 2003, political maps of the Greater Kurdistan, covering Turkish lands, were seen on the walls of state buildings of KRG. Furthermore, Massoud Barzani frequently talked about the problems of Kurdish people in Turkey and implied that he could mobilize the Kurdish people against the Turkish government. Lastly, Barzani also objected Turkey's offers regarding a permanent solution of Kirkuk's status problem and ignored Turkey's sensitivity regarding the basic rights of the Iraq Turkmen population.

Also, Turkey's military operations were limited by a result of the invasion. Iraq soils had physically become US soil and Turkey always needed permission of the US to launch a military operation in Iraq. Limited relations with Iraqi Kurdish Leaders, military operations, and very limited relations with central government in the 1990s became useless. So, Turkey had been deadlocked in Iraq and needed a new strategy different from that of the 1990s.

So, after 2008, Turkey came up with a new strategy: communication with all groups in Iraq. For both Sunni and Shiite Arabs, who want to keep Iraq unified, Turkey is an essential actor. Turkey's attitude towards the future of Iraqi Kurdistan and Kirkuk disputes can limit Kurdish leaders. So, in the new era, Turkey had relations with more political groups in Iraq.

In an earlier sign that Iraq's neighbours were improving their ties with Baghdad, Turkish Prime Minister Recep Tayyip Erdoğan became the first Turkish leader to visit Baghdad in nearly 20 years, in 2008. That visit sought to strengthen ties strained in early 2008 by attacks launched into Turkey by Kurdistan Workers' Party (PKK) rebels based in remote parts of northern Iraq.

Tensions have risen between the Kurdistan Regional Government (in northern Iraq) and Turkey, as clashes between Turkey and the PKK continue. Following a 3 April 2009 speech entitled Global Economic Crisis and Turkey, given to the Chatham House Royal Institute of Foreign Affairs on the sidelines of the G20 meeting in London, Turkish Prime Minister Erdoğan said in response to questions on relations with Iraq that "we defend establishment of an Iraqi state on the basis of Iraq nationality. Common ground is being an Iraqi national. If you set up a Kurdish state, then others will try to set up a Shia state and others an Arab state. There, you divide Iraq into three. This can lead Iraq into a civil war."

In March 2009, the presidents exchanged visits to the other country. Jalal Talabani attended the 5th World Water Forum in Istanbul and suggested a general amnesty for the PKK militants as a solution to the Turkish Kurdish conflict. The next week president Abdullah Gül visited Baghdad, where he met with Jalal Talabani. Gül aimed for a better cooperation in the fight against the PKK.

On 1 May 2009, Ankara paid host to a surprise visit from Iraqi Mahdi Army leader Muqtada al-Sadr who, in his first public appearance for two years, met with Turkish President Abdullah Gül and Prime Minister Erdoğan for talks which focused on the "political process", and requested Turkey play a greater role in establishing stability in the Middle East. Spokesman Sheikh Salah al-Obeidi confirmed the nature of the talks that had been requested by Al-Sadr and stated that "Turkey is a good, old friend. Trusting that, we had no hesitation in travelling here." After the meeting, al-Sadr visited supporters in Istanbul, where al-Obeidi says they may open a representative office, and attended a meeting with five Iraqi Parliament deputies. US State Department Deputy Assistant Secretary for Near Eastern Affairs Richard Schmierer later indicated Washington's support for Turkish engagement with al-Sadr and its involvement in Iraq in general.

On 8 May, Kurdish Natural Resources Minister Ashti Hawrami announced, "Today I received an email message from the Iraqi Oil Ministry sending us their approval for the Kurdish Government to export oil through the Iraqi pipelines to Ceyhan [in Turkey]." Iraqi Oil Ministry spokesman Asim Jihad initially denied that these first official exports of Kurdish oil had been permitted but later confirmed that, "the Iraqi Oil Ministry will start exporting crude extracted from some oil-fields in Kurdistan." Turkey's Genel Enerji Project Manager Mehmet Okutan, who is leading the joint development of Taq Taq in what is seen as a sign of growing trust in Kurd's ties with Turkey, stated, "We consider the start of the exports as a historic moment for us," with Turkish Democratic Society Party (DTP) Deputy Hasip Kaplan adding, "The good economic and social relations between Turkey and the Iraqi Kurds will serve peace efforts."

Iraq's parliament called on its government to renegotiate partnership agreements with Turkey, Syria, and Iran following a 12 May report from Iraqi Water Committee Chairman Karim al-Yacoubi that water levels had fallen to dangerous levels because neighbouring countries take too much water from the Tigris and Euphrates Rivers and their tributaries. Iraqi deputy Saleh al-Mutlaq attended a 22 May meeting with Turkish Prime Minister Erdoğan and President Gül, while Turkish Foreign Minister Ahmet Davutoğlu met with Iraqi Foreign Minister Hoshyar Zebari at the 23 May meeting of the Organisation of the Islamic Conference (OIC) Council of Foreign Ministers and announced, "We will give as much water as possible to our Iraqi and Syrian friends." According to al-Mutlaq, "They have since increased the quantities of water coming to Iraq by 130 cubic centimetres per second. It is not enough, but it has partly solved the water problems preventing our farmers from planting rice."

Iraqi Prime Minister Nouri al-Maliki confronted the activities of the PKK, following the May 15 foundation laying ceremony of a Turkish-constructed hospital in Karbala, by claiming that "We have a reliable cooperation with Turkey to bring an end to this terrorist organisation and other organisations that want to damage other neighbouring countries, who are our friends. When it comes to Turkey's possible intervention in northern Iraq, the issue is more massive and complicated than it is assumed to be. There is the need for a grand cooperation", and "I know the mountains where the PKK take shelter; they are precipitous mountains. We will find ways to stop the activities of this terror organisation and to finish this organisation through cooperation and understanding between us and Turkey." Iraqi Kurdish Prime Minister Nechirvan Barzani confirmed, "The Turkish Army threatened an incursion. But with the dialogue built recently, all these problems have been overcome", and "I have always attached a great deal of importance to our relations with Turkey because Turkey is not only a neighbouring country but also very important for us."

On October 19, 2011, twenty-four soldiers were killed and 18 injured during a PPK attack in southeastern Turkey. Rockets were launched at security forces and military sites in the town of Cukurca. Turkey retaliated with air strikes on Kurdish sites in northern Iraq. Several rebels died. The Turkish parliament recently renewed a law that gives Turkish forces the ability to pursue rebels over the border in Iraq."

In 2015, Turkish diplomats in Mosul were kidnapped by the Islamic State during the War in Iraq 2013-2017. The diplomats were rescued and the consulate reopened after the Islamic State defeat.

Iraqi President Barham Salih condemned the 2019 Turkish offensive into north-eastern Syria, stating that "Turkey’s military incursion into Syria is a grave escalation; will cause untold humanitarian suffering, empower terrorist groups. The world must unite to avert a catastrophe, promote political resolution to the rights of all Syrians, including Kurds, to peace, dignity and security".

== Kurdistan Workers Party based in Iraq ==
The Kurdistan Workers Party, based in Iraq, declared an immediate ceasefire on 1 March, following a call from its jailed leader, Abdullah Ocalan, for disarmament and dissolution. The move, supported by President Tayyip Erdogan’s government and the pro-Kurdish DEM party, marks a potential turning point in the 40-year conflict that has killed over 40,000 people. Erdogan warned that Turkey would resume military operations if the process stalled. The PKK urged Ankara to grant Ocalan greater freedoms to oversee disarmament, but Turkish officials ruled out negotiations or amnesty.

== Turkish military presence in Iraq ==
Based on agreements from 1995 and 1997 relating to Turkey's operations against the PKK, Turkey maintains a military force of some 2,000 troops in bases some 30 – 40 km inside Iraq. Bases are located in different locations along the Turkish border in Duhok Governorate. After initial deployment to a former Iraqi military airfield at Bamarni (37°05′54″N 43°016′25″E), Turkish military control has expanded west of Bamarni to Batifa and to the east close to the town of Kani Masi (Qanimasi) in the Amadiya District. Turkey has also some 150 troops and 20 tanks at Mosul Bashiqa region part of the operations against Islamic state responsible for training Iraqi troops.

On 2017, Turkey signed agreement with Iraq which includes allowing the Turkish army to pursue elements of the PKK in northern Iraq, with the permission of, and in coordination with the Federal Government of Iraq. It also includes opening two liaison offices between Baghdad and Ankara to exchange intelligence and security information between the two countries. The Iraqi cabinet in October 2012 announced that Turkish forces crossing into Iraq "is a violation of Iraq's sovereignty and security" as Turkish forces used military bases in Iraq against the PKK.

On April 25, 2017, 5 Peshmerga fighters were killed during a Turkish attack on Sinjar in Iraq. Turkey claimed to have destroyed "terror hubs"; Iraq denounced the strike as a “violation" of its "sovereignty”.

On August 23, 2019, Turkish army launched Operation Claw-3 in northern Iraq against PKK.

In May 2021, Iraq protested to Turkish diplomats after the visit of the Turkish Minister of Defense, the Turkish Chief of the General Staff and the Turkish Land Forces Commander to a Turkish base in northern Iraq. The Iraq's Foreign Ministry said that "categorically rejects the continuing violations of Iraqi sovereignty ... by the Turkish military forces.”

In April 2022, Turkey began a military operation in northern Iraq against the PKK which was called Operation Claw-Lock. The Iraqi foreign minister condemned the attack, alleging it to be a violation of Iraq's sovereignty.

== Diplomacy ==
Republic of Iraq

- Ankara (Embassy)
- Istanbul (Consulate–General)
- Gaziantep (Consulate–General)

Republic of Turkey

- Baghdad (Embassy)
- Basra (Consulate–General)
- Erbil (Consulate–General)
- Mosul (Consulate–General)

== See also ==
- Foreign relations of Iraq
- Foreign relations of Turkey
- Turks in Iraq
- Iraqis in Turkey
- List of ambassadors of Turkey to Iraq
- 2025 Iraq oil for water deal
