= Ibrahim Khalil border crossing =

Border crossing between Iraq and Turkey

Ibrahim Khalil Bridge دەروازەی ئیبراھیم خەلیل / منفذ إبراهيم الخليل الدولي
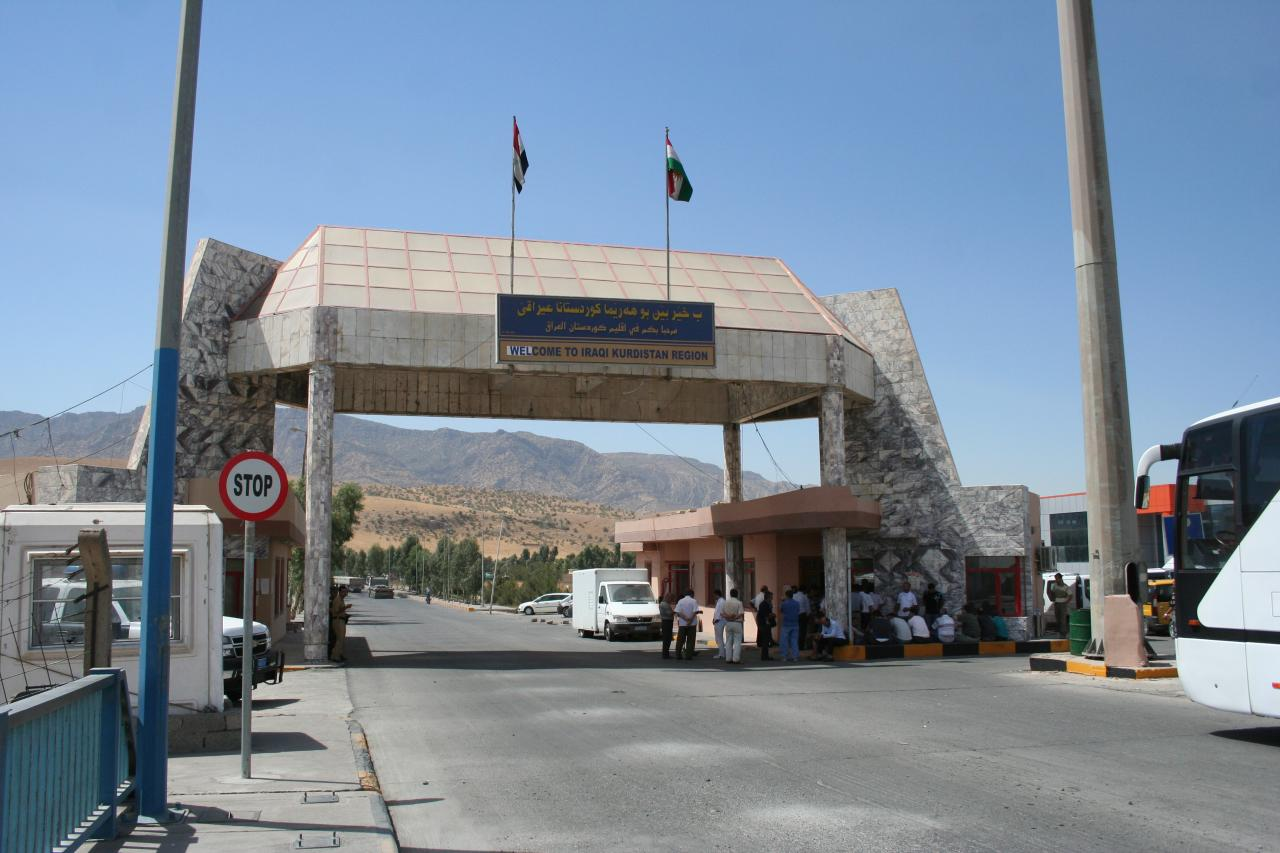
- Front Gate of Ibrahim Khalil border in Iraq
- Coordinates: 37°08′41.00″N 42°33′56″E
- Carries: Road transport, commercial traffic, and military logistics
- Crosses: Khabur River
- Locale: Iraq–Turkey border
- Begins: Silopi, Şırnak Province, Turkey
- Ends: Zakho, Duhok Governorate, Kurdistan Region, Iraq
- Official name: Ibrahim Khalil Border Bridge
- Other name: Habur Border Gate
- Named for: Ibrahim Khalil border crossing
- Owner: Kurdistan Regional Government
- Maintained by: Kurdistan Regional Government

Characteristics
- Traversable?: Yes
- Towpaths: No

Statistics
- Daily traffic: Cargo, civilian and military vehicles

Location
- Interactive map of Ibrahim Khalil Bridge

Ibrahim Khalil (Kurdish: دەروازەی ئیبراھیم خەلیل, Arabic: منفذ إبراهيم الخليل الدولي) is a border crossing point between Turkey and Iraq. It is also called the Habur Border or Frontier Gate in English. Before the control point and gate there is a bridge crossing the Khabur river, which forms the natural border between Iraq and Turkey. The crossing is located to the south of the town of Silopi.

Although it serves as an entry point into Iraq, the crossing is controlled by the Kurdistan Regional Government, which enforces its own customs and immigration policies. These are implemented at checkpoints staffed by Kurdish Peshmerga fighters operating under the flag of Kurdistan—a red, white, and green tricolor with a golden sun.

In September 2004, the 167th Corps Support Group, a New Hampshire Army Reserve unit, was deployed to Ibrahim Khalil to monitor supplies being shipped from logistics centers in northern Turkey to coalition forces in Iraq.

On 6 December 2015, approximately 3,000 Turkish soldiers crossed the border en route to the Mosul countryside.

== Photo gallery ==
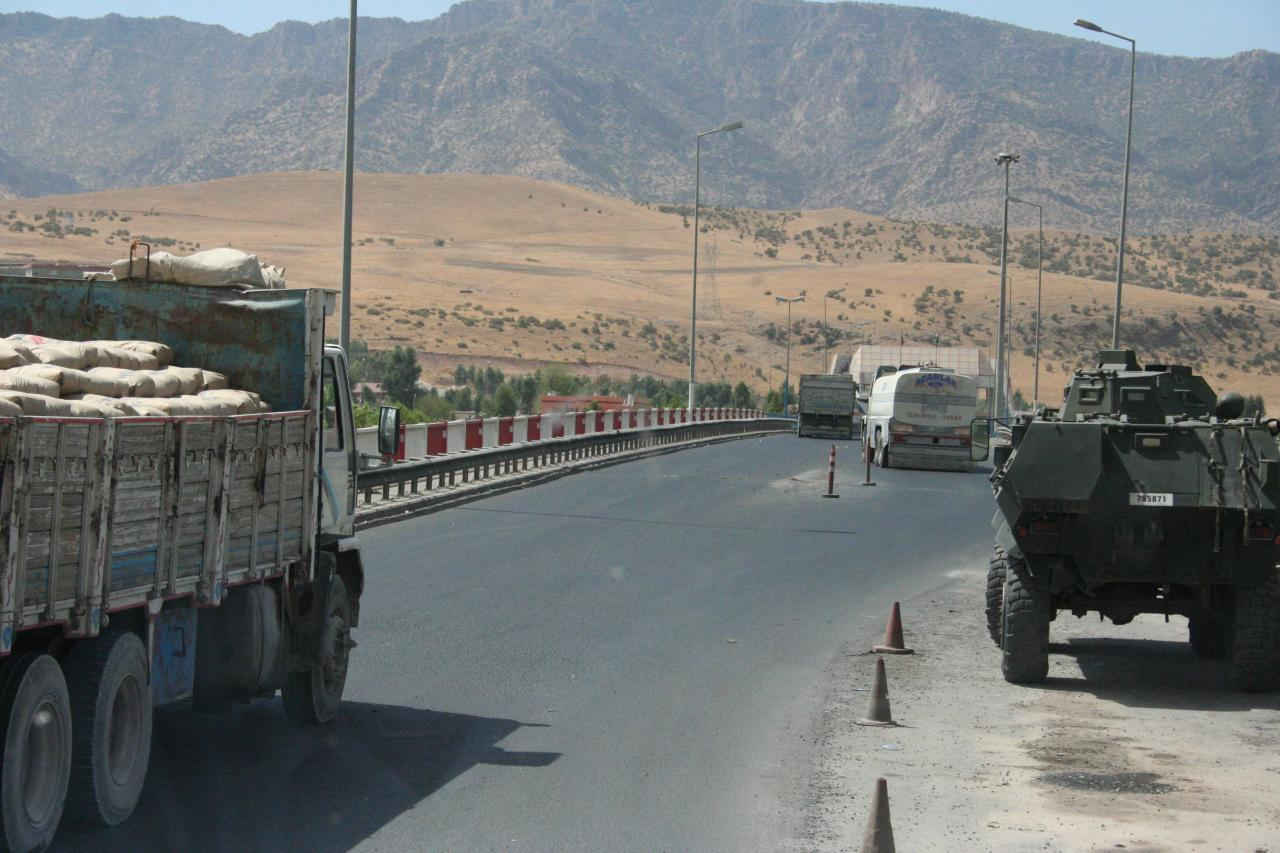

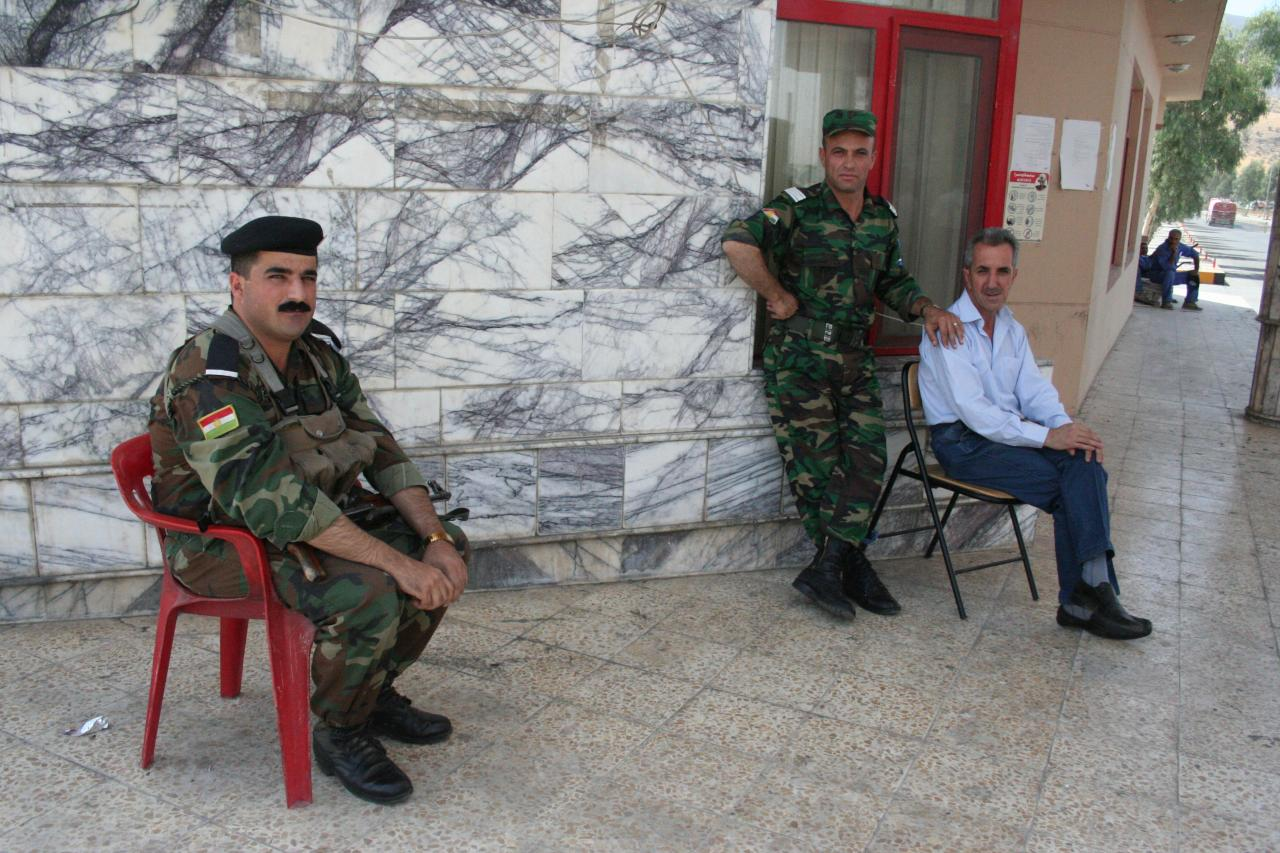

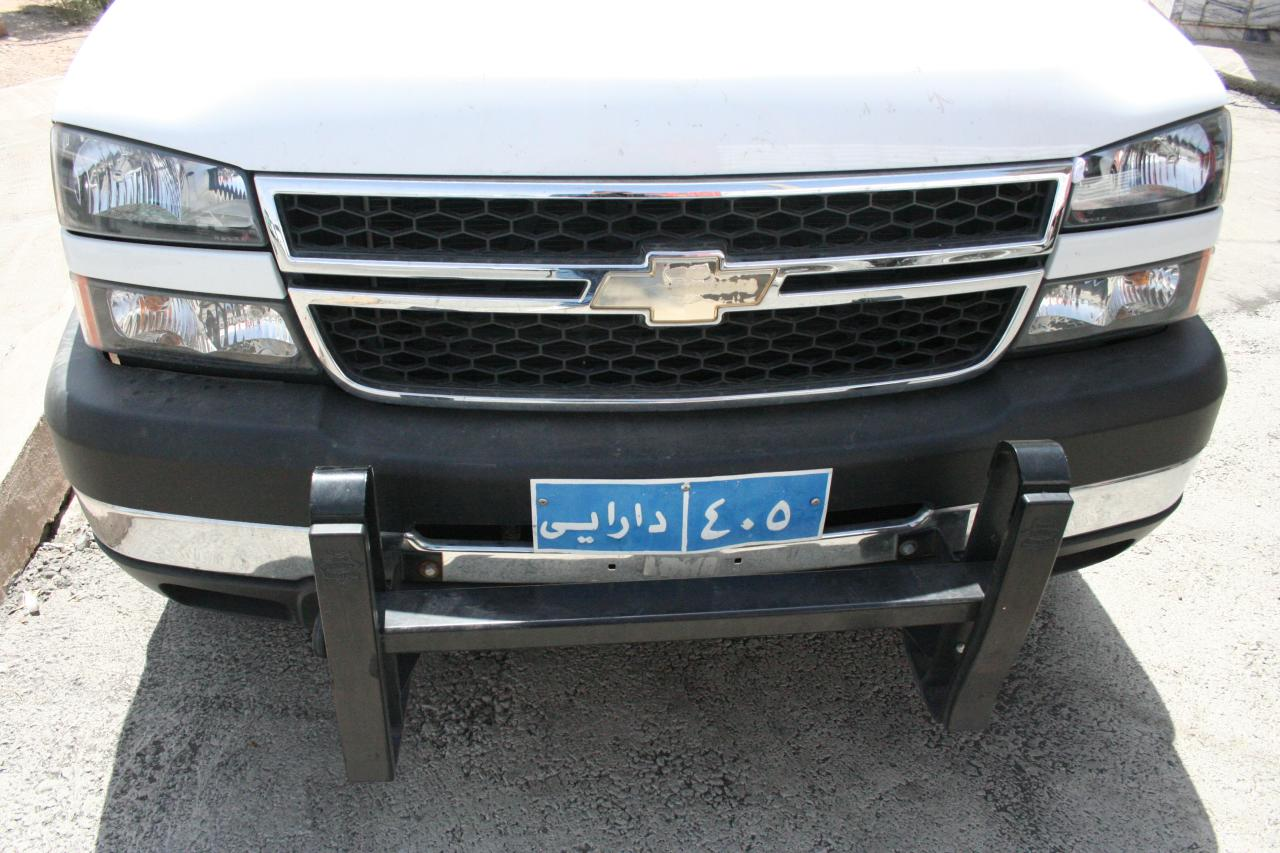

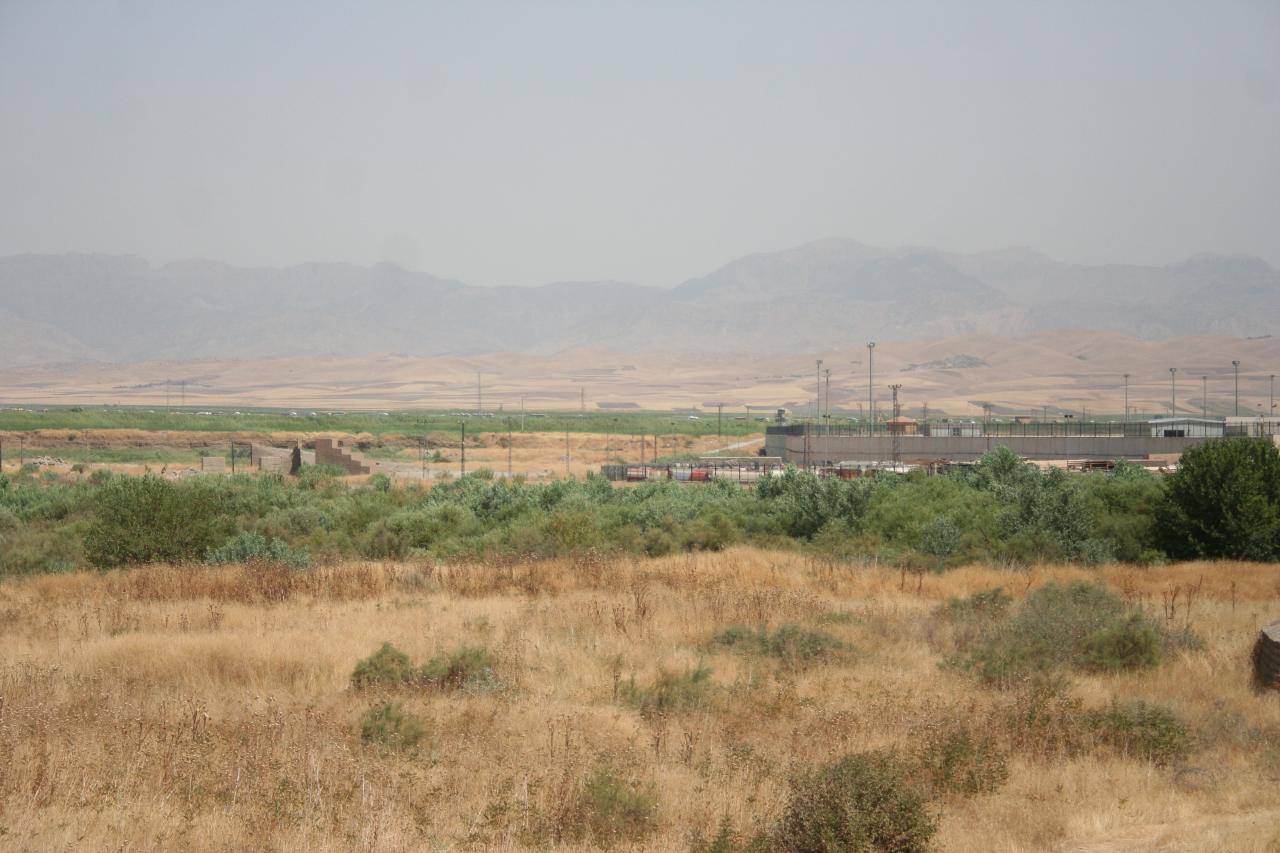

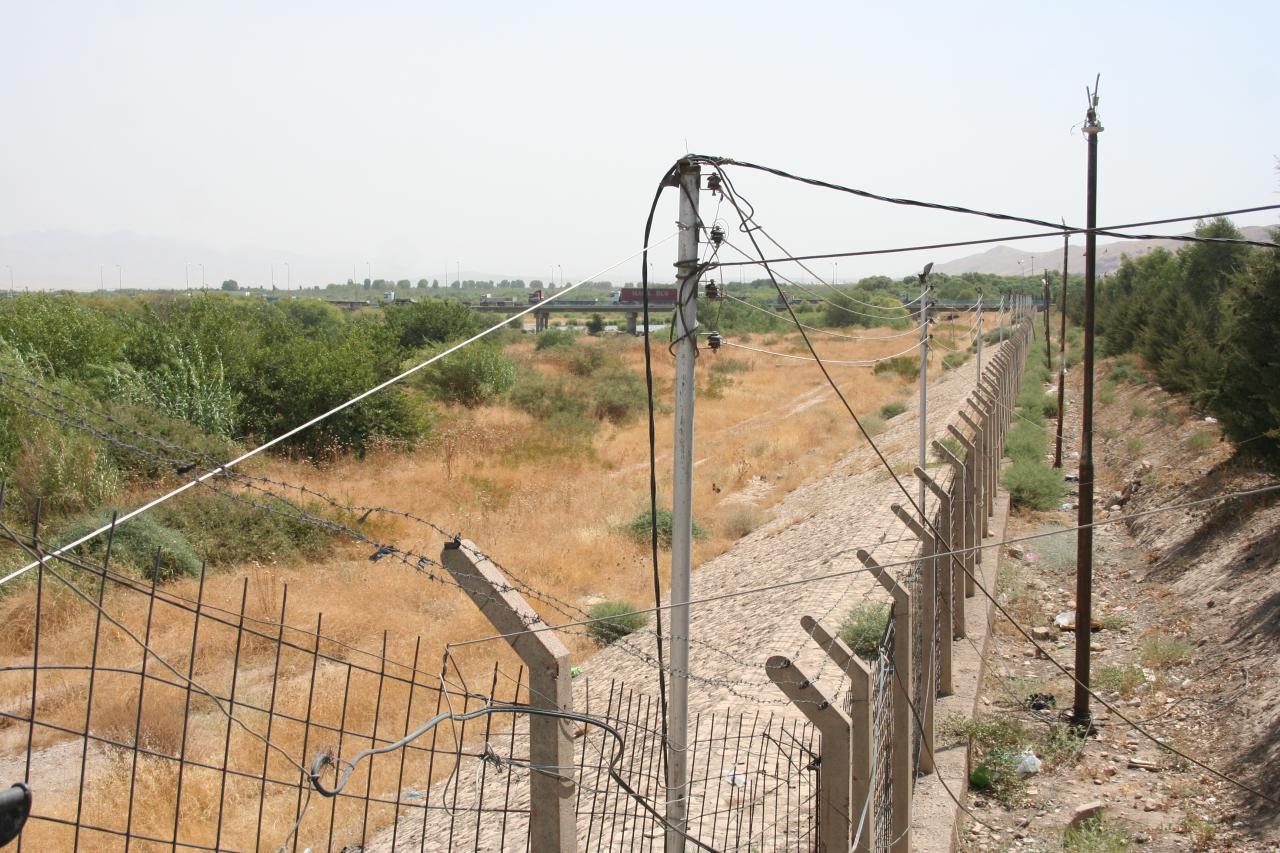

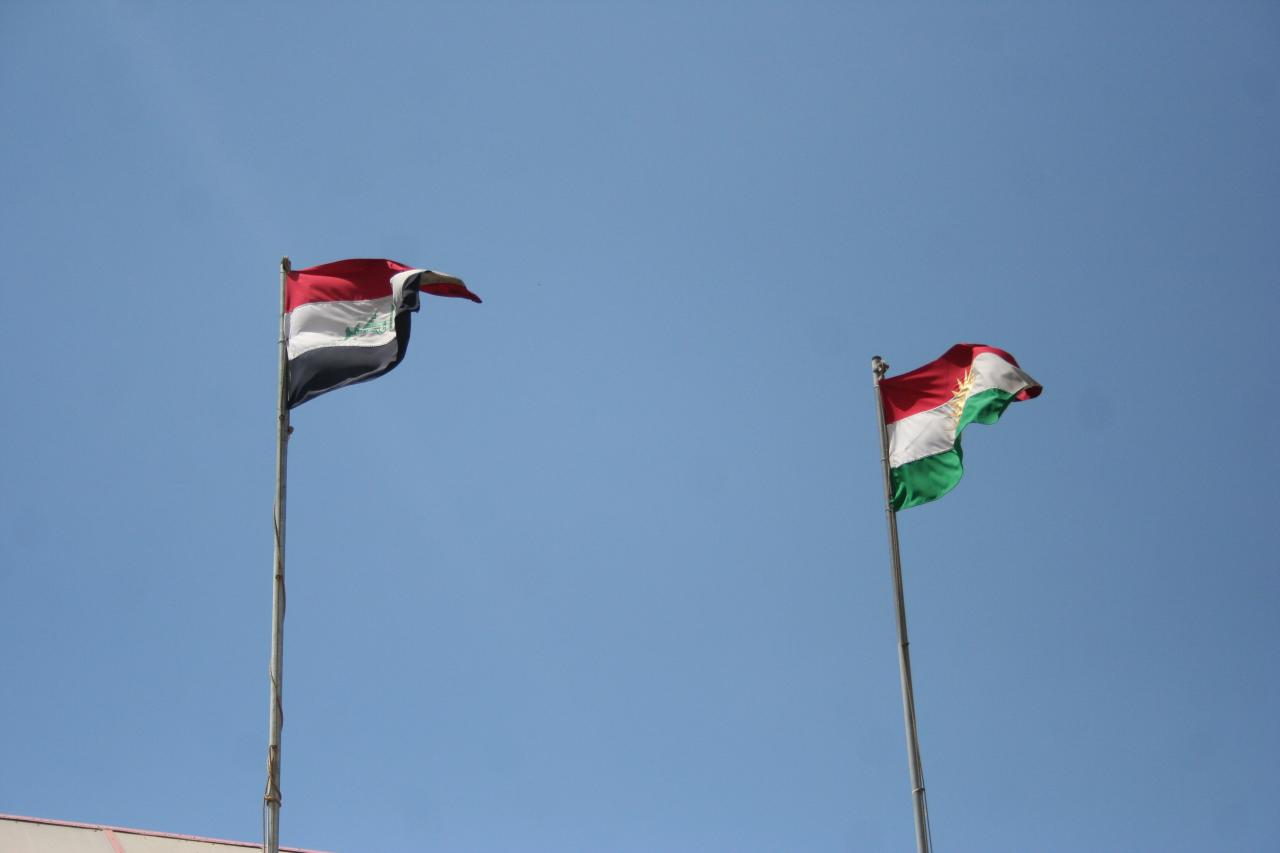

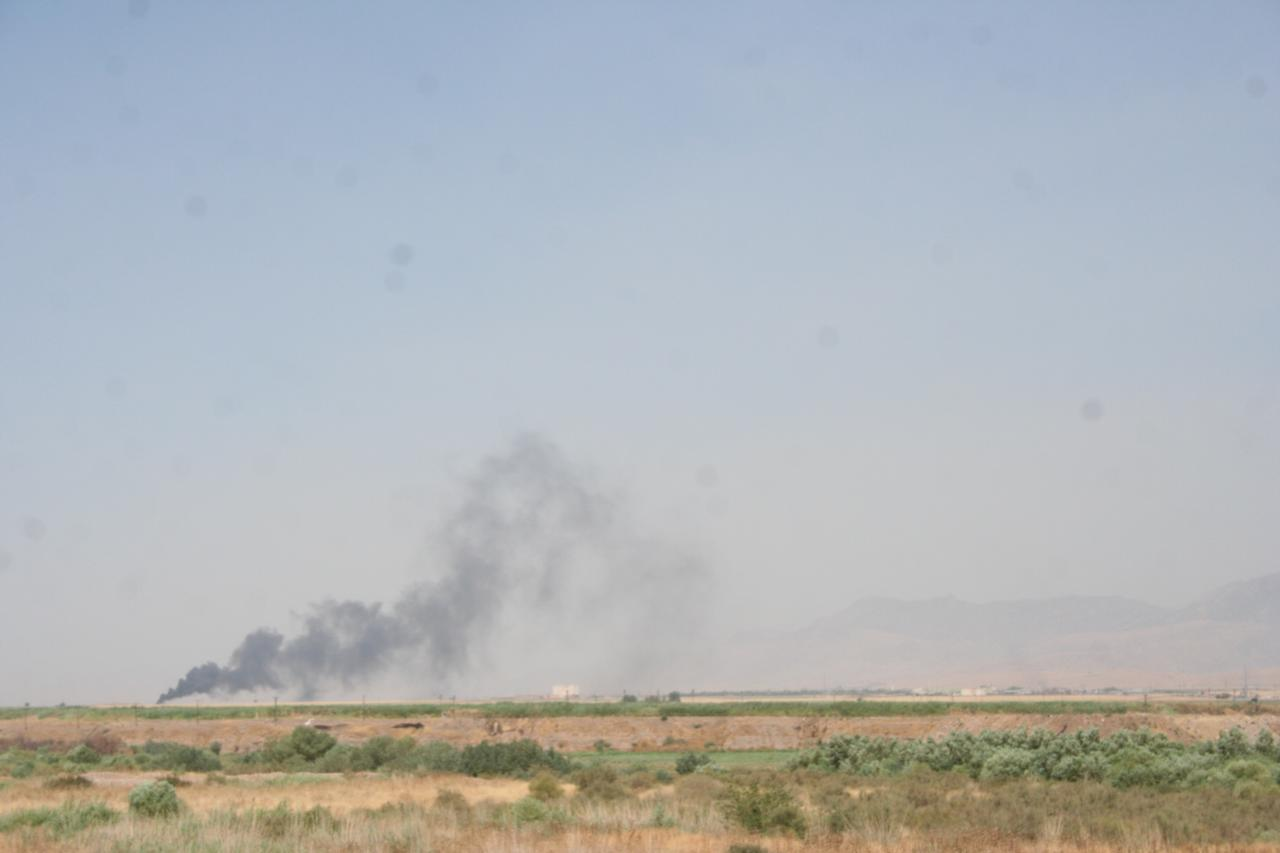

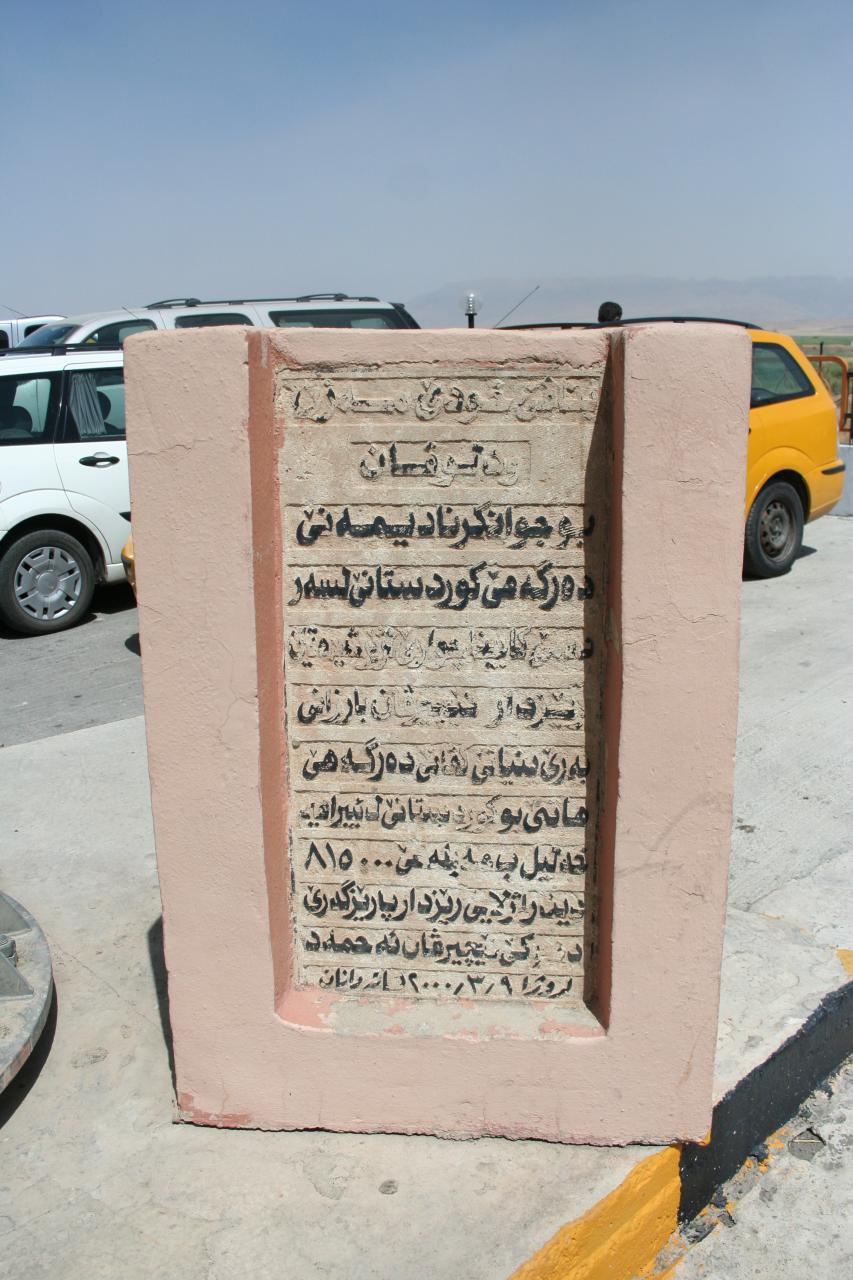

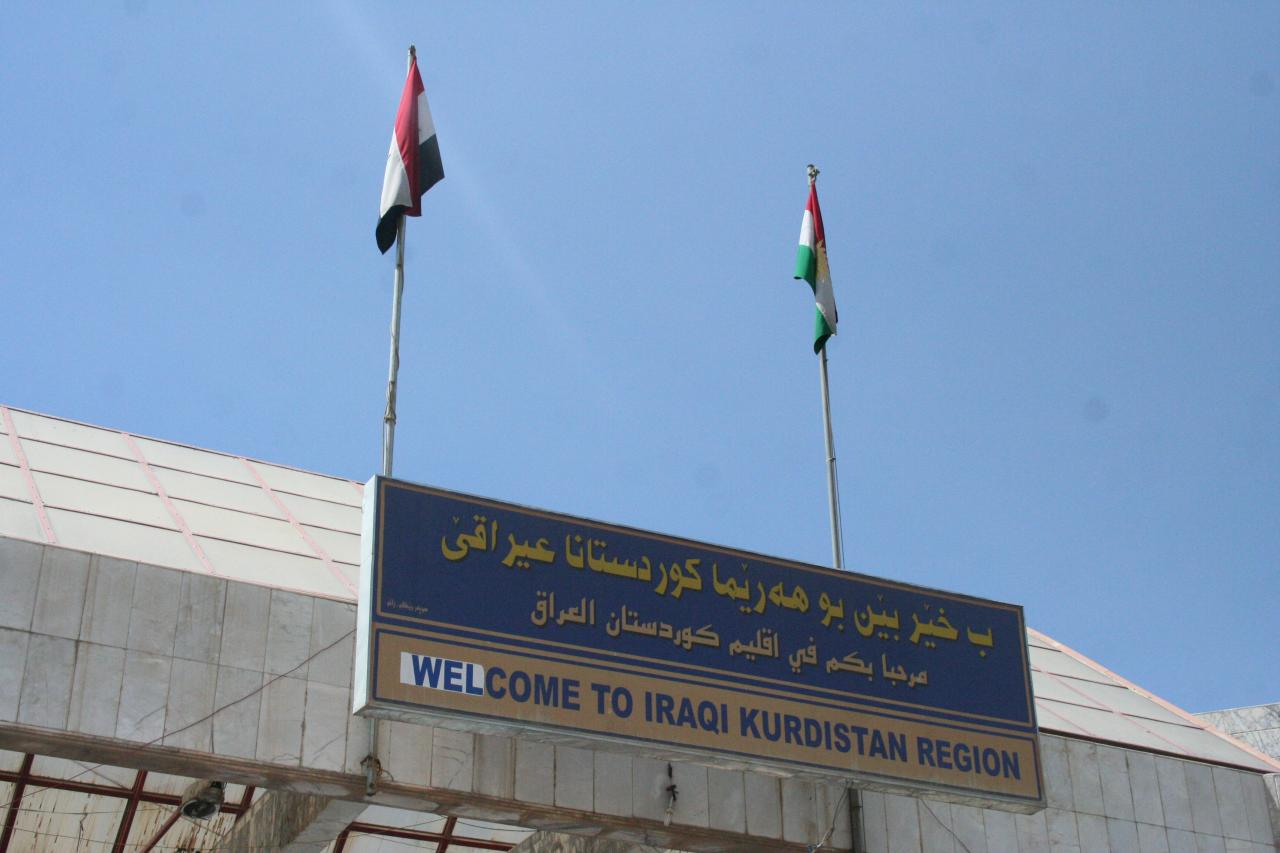

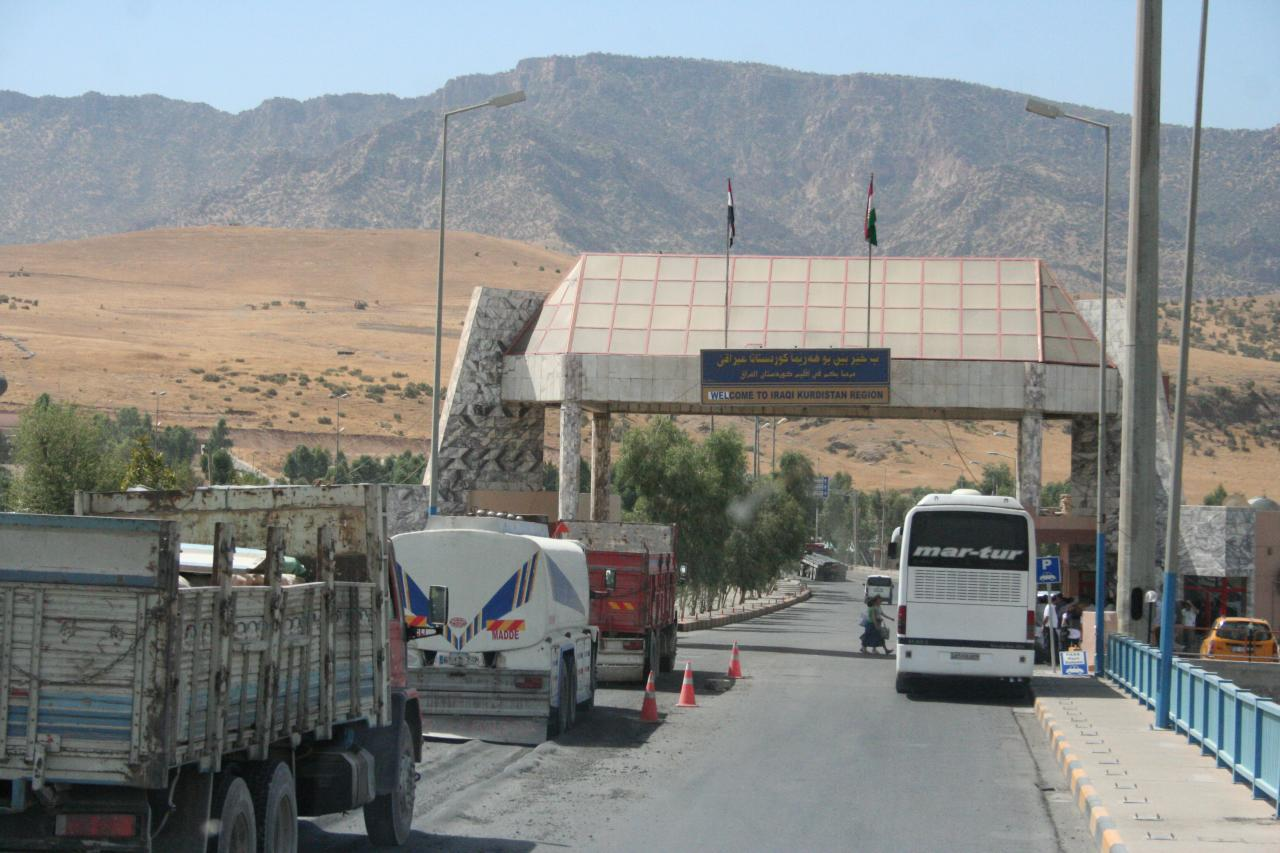

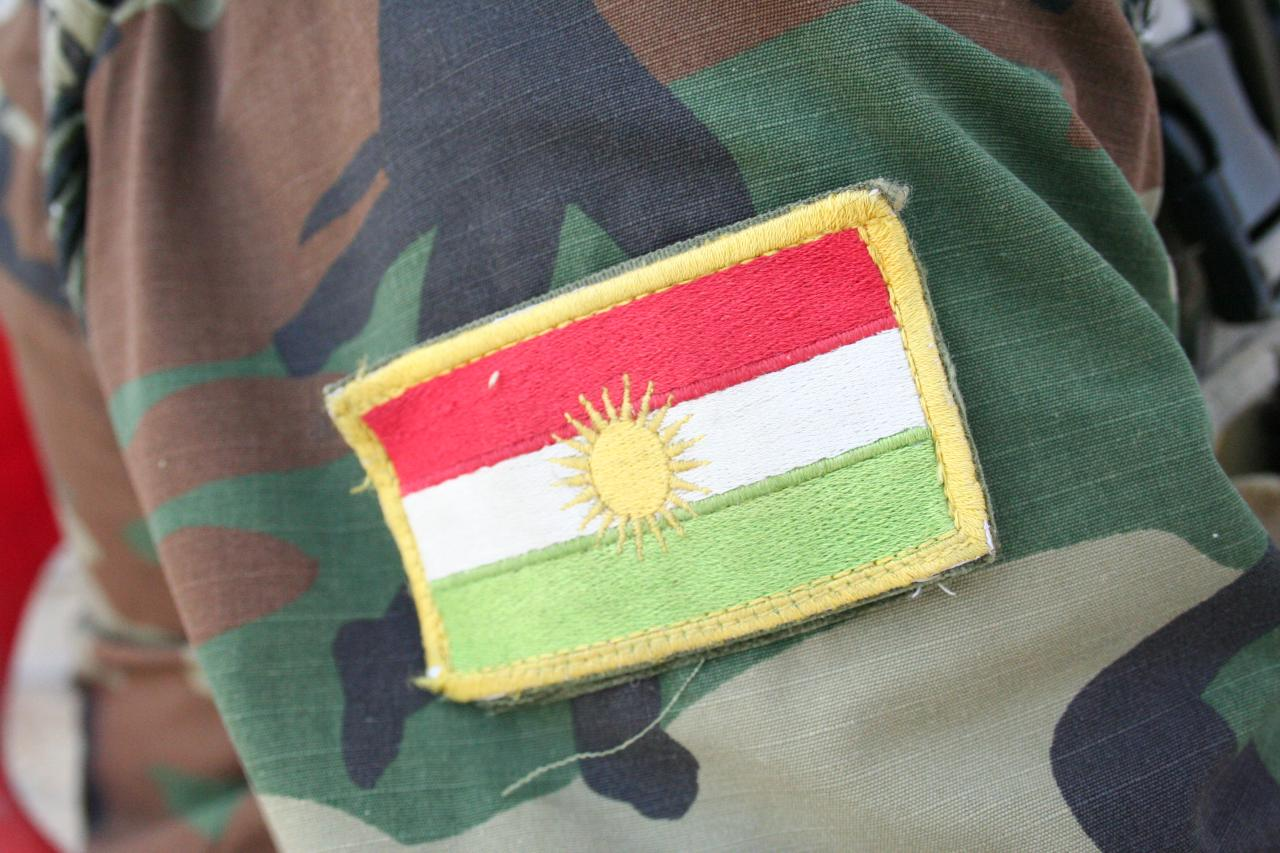

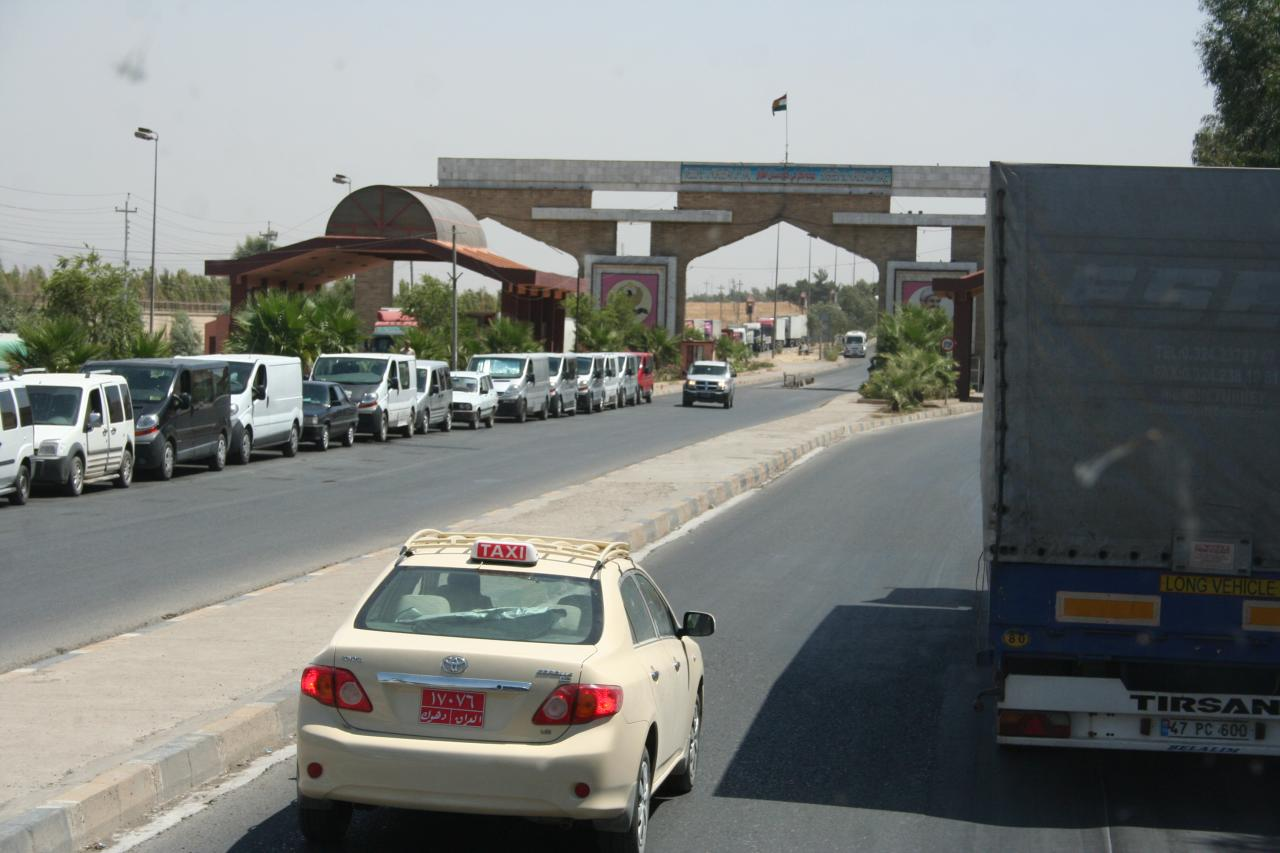
