= 1921 Iraqi monarchy referendum =

Referendum of Iraq

A referendum was held in Mandatory Iraq between 16 July and 11 August 1921 to determine the form of government and head of state.

== Background ==
During World War I, the United Kingdom occupied several parts of the Ottoman Empire. Three Mesopotamian vilayets (provinces) including Basra, Baghdad, and Mosul were combined to form Iraq. A group of Iraqi politicians met in Cairo in 1921 and called for a monarchy headed by Faisal bin Hussein. The Iraqi government and British administration approved this decision; and a referendum was held to determine the public approval.

== Results ==
The referendum started on 16 July 1921 and ended on 11 August 1921. The results were announced on 19 August 1921 with 96% of the voters approving Faisal as King.

== Aftermath ==
Faisal was crowned on 23 August 1921. Subsequently, a new Iraqi government was formed by Abdul-Muhsin Al-Saadoun on 20 November 1922, and elections for a constituent assembly were held between 1922 and 1924.
