= 1918 Clemenceau–Lloyd George Agreement (Middle East) =

1918 agreement between the United Kingdom and France

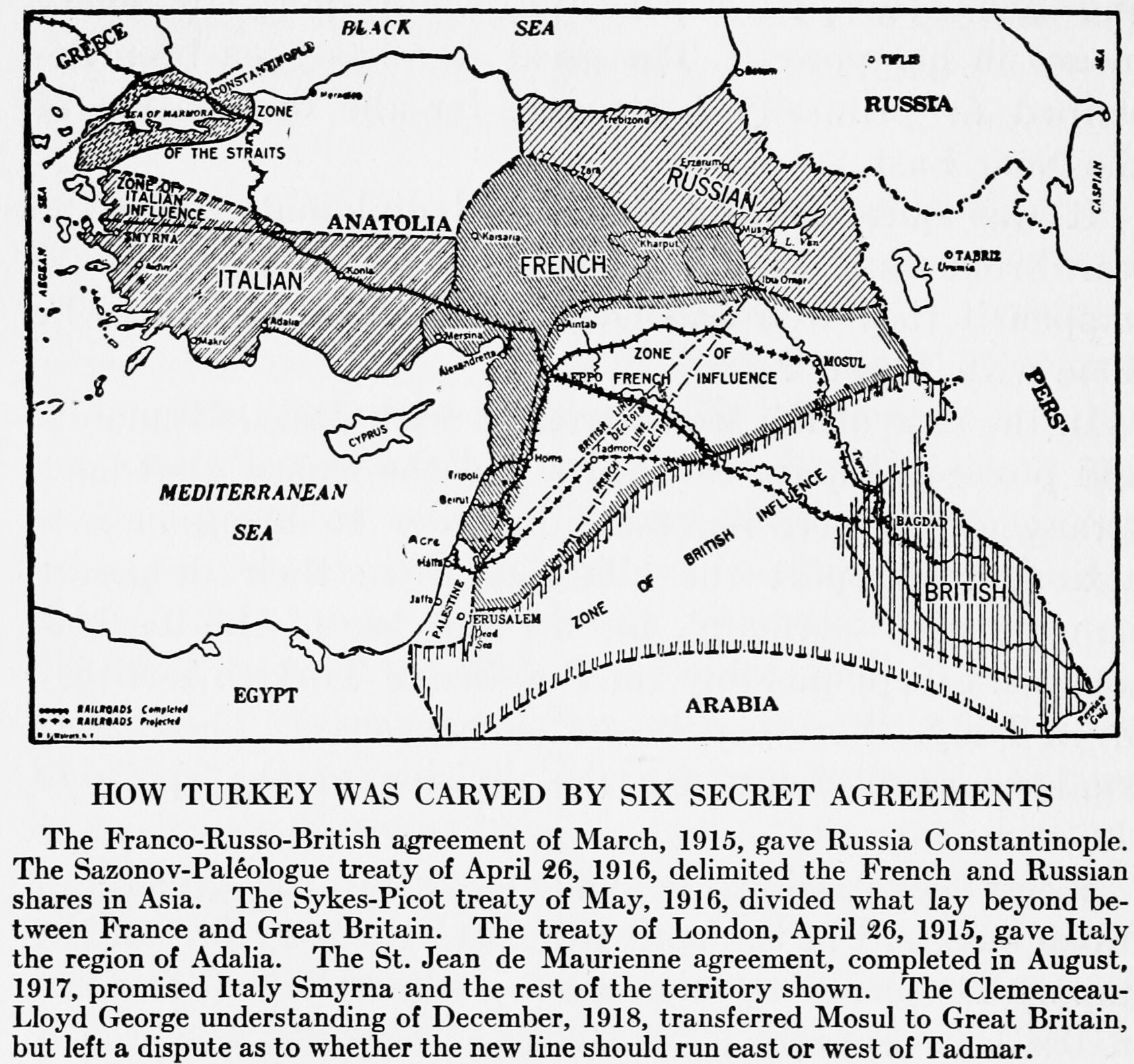
Ray Stannard Baker's diagram of the six secret agreements, which were used in the negotiations to partition the Ottoman Empire makes reference to the Clemenceau–Lloyd George Agreement over Mosul.

The Clemenceau–Lloyd George Agreement of 1 December 1918 was a verbal agreement that modified the 1916 Sykes–Picot Agreement in respect to Palestine and the Mosul vilayet. The latter component is also known as the Mosul cession. The agreement was between British and French Prime Ministers David Lloyd George and Georges Clemenceau and took place at the French Embassy in London.

During World War I, the United Kingdom and France signed the secret Sykes–Picot Agreement in 1916, which effectively partitioned the Ottoman Empire into areas of British and French control and spheres of influence. Part of the Mosul vilayet, namely the city of Mosul and the area south to the Little Zab, was allocated to France by the agreement, and this accord was formally ratified in May 1916.

Despite this agreement, Clemenceau would abandon France's claims on Mosul, northern Mesopotamia, and Palestine, transferring control to Britain after a private discussion on 1 December 1918. In return, France would gain rights to a large share of all oil to be discovered in now-British Mosul—known to have substantial deposits—though the exact percentages would remain unclear until the Long-Berenger Oil Agreement of 8 April 1919. More importantly, Clemenceau also hoped that the agreement would allow France further leverage to pursue its peace treaty goals in the Rhineland and allow a stronger French claim to Syria and Lebanon as set out in the Sykes-Picot agreement, against the Britain-aligned Arab Kingdom. The agreement was finalised in a meeting at Deauville in 1919.

The agreement was controversial because France did not appear to have gained any substantial changes from Britain in return for the concessions of Mosul and Palestine. John J McTague Jr wrote, "Despite the informality of this agreement, Lloyd George and Clemenceau held to it and it became the basis for legitimizing the British claim to Palestine".

== See also ==
- Mosul question

== Bibliography ==
- Fitzgerald, Edward Peter. "France's Middle Eastern Ambitions, the Sykes–Picot Negotiations, and the Oil Fields of Mosul." The Journal of Modern History 66.4 (1994): 697–725. JSTOR 2125155
- Ranjdar Mohammed Azeez Al-Jaf (2018). British Policy Towards the Government of the Mosul Vilayet, 1916-1926 (PDF) (Thesis). University of Leicester. Archived from the original (PDF) on April 25, 2019.
- Paul C. Helmreich (1974). From Paris to Sèvres: the partition of the Ottoman Empire at the Peace Conference of 1919-1920. Ohio State University Press. ISBN 978-0-8142-0170-1.
