= Mosul question =

20th-century territorial dispute between the Republic of Turkey and British-ruled Iraq

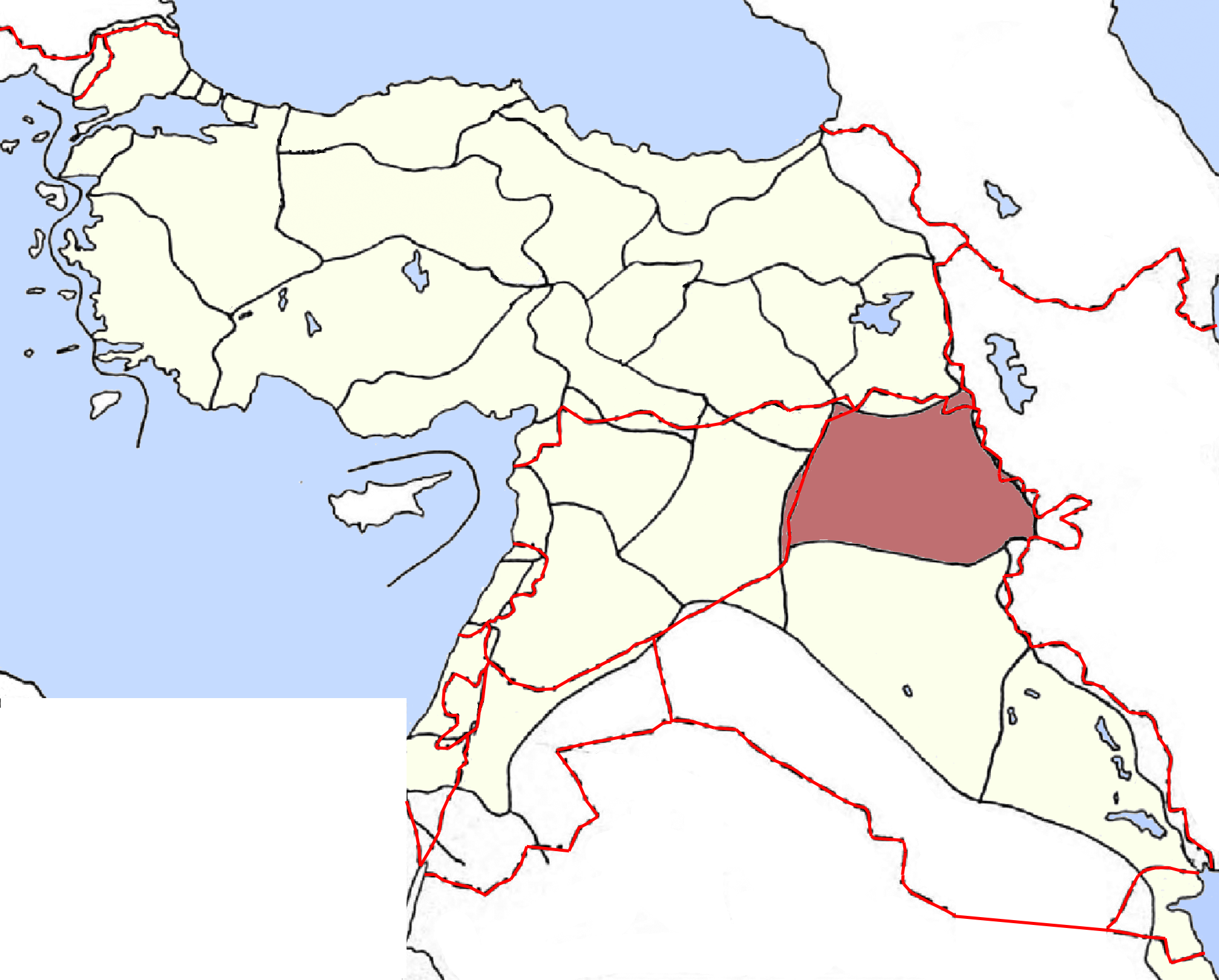
The vilayet of Mosul in 1914, with modern borders superimposed

The Mosul question was a territorial dispute in the early 20th century between Turkey and the United Kingdom (later Iraq) over the possession of the former Ottoman Mosul vilayet.

The Mosul vilayet was part of Ottoman Iraq until the end of World War I, when it was occupied by Britain. After the Turkish War of Independence, the new Turkish Republic considered Mosul one of the crucial issues to be determined by the National Pact. Despite relentless opposition from Turkey, Britain managed to bring the issue to the international scene and to scale it down to a frontier problem between Turkey and Iraq. During the negotiations for the Treaty of Lausanne, the Turkish side argued that the Kurds and Turks were not “racially separable“, and that the Arabs constituted only a minority of the population. Turkey appealed for the population's right of self-determination and claimed that the majority wanted to be a part of Turkey. The British responded that the Kurds were of Indo-European and the Turks of Turanic origin, and on the 4 February 1923, the parties decided that the Mosul Question would be excluded from the Lausanne Treaty negotiations.

On May 19, 1924, the Istanbul Conference was held between Turkey and Britain. At the conference, the Turkish side argued that Mosul had historically always been Ottoman territory, that this situation had not changed at the end of the First World War, and that since two thirds of the population of the province consisted of Muslim Turks and Kurds, Mosul should be within the borders of Turkey for historical, military and ethnic reasons. The Istanbul Conference was dissolved after the British side steadfastly rejected Turkey's request. The dispute was taken to the League of Nations, where the Turkish side repeated their arguments and demanded a general referendum. Britain rejected that request as well, stating that the people of the region lacked a national consciousness. The Turkish side continued to push for the inclusion of Mosul into Turkey due to ethnic reasons despite the city of Mosul being a majority Arab city.

The Organisation of the League of Nations made a decision on December 16, 1925, allotting the vilayet of Mosul to Iraq, buth with a stipulation reserving to the Kurds the fulfilment of their desires, mainly that "officials of Kurd race should be appointed for the government of their country, for the administration of justice and for teaching in the schools and that the Kurd language should be the official language of all these services." The League of Nations Council appointed an investigative commission that recommended that Iraq should retain Mosul, and Turkey reluctantly assented to the decision by signing the Frontier Treaty of 1926 with the Iraqi government. Iraq agreed to give to Turkey 10 percent of the royalty that was soon expected to flow from the Turkish Petroleum Company to the Iraqi government with the 75-year concession signed on March 14, 1925 between the two. The company found oil near Kirkuk in 1927 and the first significant commercial exploitation of oil from Mosul began in 1934 with the opening of the Kirkuk-Haifa oil pipeline.

== History ==
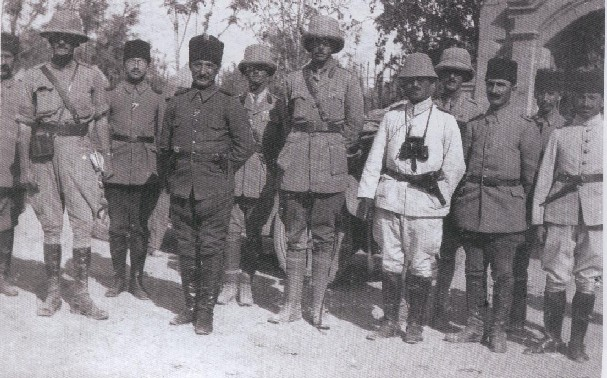
British and Ottoman officials meet in northern Iraq during November 1918

=== Mosul cession ===
In 1916, the United Kingdom and France signed the secret Sykes–Picot Agreement, which effectively partitioned the Ottoman Empire into areas of British and French control and spheres of influence. The Mosul vilayet was allocated to France by the agreement, and this accord was formally ratified in May 1916. Shortly before the end of World War I, on October 30, 1918, the debilitated Ottoman Empire and the United Kingdom signed the Armistice of Mudros. The agreement stipulated a cessation of hostilities effective October 31, 1918. Three weeks after World War I ended, French Prime Minister Georges Clemenceau abandoned France's claim to Mosul and ceded control of all of northern Mesopotamia to Britain, following a private discussion on December 1, 1918. In return, British Prime Minister David Lloyd George promised Clemenceau a significant share of any oil discovered in British-controlled Mosul, possibly as much as 50 percent.

=== British occupation and Turkish claim ===
For the British, "It was most desirable that Mosul should be occupied by the British force and General Marshall should send a detachment to Mosul to accept the surrender of the Turkish garrison". After discussions with Ali Ihsan Pasha, the local Ottoman commander, and communications between London and the Ottoman government in which the British justified their intent by reference to Clause 7 of the agreement and their intent to proceed in any event, the local commander was instructed to withdraw, and the British occupied Mosul on 10 November 1918.

In August 1920, the Treaty of Sèvres was signed to end the war, but the Ottomans still contested the British right to Mosul as being taken illegally since Mudros. Even when the Treaty of Lausanne was signed between Turkey and Britain in 1923, Turkey maintained that Britain was controlling the Mosul vilayet illegally. British officials in London and Baghdad continued to believe that Mosul was imperative to the survival of Iraq because of its resources and the security of its mountainous border. Turkish leaders were also afraid that Kurdish nationalism would thrive under the British mandate and start trouble with the Kurdish population in Turkey.

=== League of Nations investigation ===
To reach a resolution on the conflicting claims over Mosul, the League of Nations was called on to send a factfinding commission to determine the rightful owner. The commission investigated the region and reported that Turkey had no claim to Mosul, which belonged to the British, and that no one else had any rightful claim to the area. Britain was highly influential in the League of Nations. The Secretary of the War Cabinet, Maurice Hankey, had already decided before the commission's work was completed that Britain needed to have control over the whole area because of its oil concerns for the Royal Navy.

Because the British also wanted to soothe Turkish anger over the League of Nations decision, they gave Turkey a portion of the oil profits. By having control over the oil and the Iraq Petroleum Company, the British stayed in control of the resources of Mosul even though they had given political control back to Faisal.

Another area of contention between Britain and Turkey was the actual boundary line. There was a Brussels Line, which had been decided by the League of Nations as the true border of Iraq, and a British line, which had been the division line that the Britain had used as reference. When that was brought up to British leaders, both Percy Cox, the British High Commissioner of Iraq, and Arnold Wilson, the British civil commissioner in Baghdad, urged Prime Minister Lloyd George to use the Brussels Line because they did not think there was that large of a difference between the two lines.

== Other claimants ==
=== Kingdom of Iraq ===
The Mosul vilayet was not just contested by external powers, Britain and Turkey. Faisal ibn Hussein, the Hashemite ruler who had become the king of the newly created state of Iraq by the British in 1921, also wanted to claim the Mosul vilayet as his. In part Faisal wanted the Mosul vilayet because due to its Sunni majority, it would bring a counterweight to the Shia majority of the Iraqi population. The British liked and respected Faisal because of all of the assistance that he had given to them, and they also felt that they could trust him to do what they wanted. In that belief, Britain was both right and wrong. Faisal was a brilliant diplomat who balanced what the British wanted and the true needs of his people into a very complex system. However, one of the things that he wanted most was the unification of and a strong status for Iraq, which he did not believe to be possible without the control of the Mosul vilayet. Sharif Hussein, King of the Hejaz, urged against concessions on Mosul, as he considered it "an integral part of the Arab state of Iraq".

Prior to the League of Nations decision, Faisal had continually petitioned the British government to give control of Mosul to him so that he could succeed in his aim of unification. Finally, after the League of Nations decision, the British agreed to let Faisal control Mosul in return for important resource concessions. The British founded the Turkish Petroleum Company, which they later renamed to the Iraq Petroleum Company (IPC).

=== Kurds ===
Another internal group that wanted control over Mosul were the Kurds. They were over half the population and had long fought against integration into Iraq because they wanted independence. Most Kurds did not consider themselves as a part of the new country of Iraq. Various Kurdish leaders rallied Kurdish groups that already had their own weapons and had been helped by different imperial powers on occasions that it suited their needs. Furthermore, many Kurds felt betrayed by promises that the British had made in earlier times but not kept such as the establishment of an independent nation known as Kurdistan for the Kurds. The King of Iraq Faisal wanted to integrate the Kurds because most of them were Sunni Muslim, and he felt that he needed them to balance out the Shi'ite population. Britain used both the Kurdish firepower and Faisal's desire for a united Iraq to keep a stranglehold over him, and Iran under Reza Shah later used the Kurds and their firepower to keep the unrest in Iraq. The Kurds did not want to be integrated into Iraq but supported the continuance of the British mandate in the area.

== Demographics ==
The vilayet contained populations that spoke Arabic, Turkish, Kurdish and Syriac. In contrast to Mosul's neighbours, it was much more directly integrated into the Ottoman Empire. In terms of religious communities, it was predominately Sunni Muslim, with notable communities of Christian Assyrians, Yazidis and Jews that made up a total population of about 800,000 people in the early 20th century. The communities and their respective leaders were heavily influenced by the political hierarchy, trading networks, and the judicial system of the Ottoman Empire even though they considered themselves on their own and not completely controlled by the empire.

Turkish statesman Ismet Pasha claimed that the population of Mosul was primarily composed of Turks and Kurds, and claimed that the two ethnic groups were the same people by ancestral origin. The British rejected any ethno-national commonality between Turks and Kurds and emphasized that the Kurds and the Kurdish language were of Indo-European origin. The British produced population statistics that backed up the predominantly Arab and Kurdish ethnic composition of Mosul and the northern regions. Ismet Pasha insisted that the population of Turks in Mosul exceeded that of Arabs, although the British dismissed this argument and asserted that those Turkmen speak a different variant of Turkish.

Ethnic groups in Mosul vilayet (1922–1924)
	Number and percentage	Percentage
Kurds	520,007	64.9%
Arabs	166,941	20.8%
Christians	61,336	7.7%
Turks	38,652	4.8%
Yazidis	26,257	3.3%
Jews	11,897	1.5%
Total	801,000	100%

== Economic resources ==
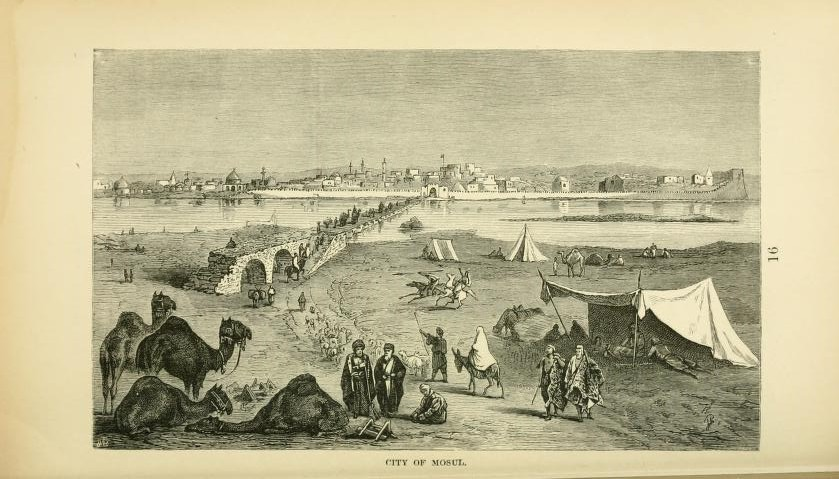
An 1876 sketch of Mosul

During the period of Ottoman rule, Mosul was involved in the production of fine cotton goods. Oil was a known commodity in the region and has been critically important ever since World War I. Mosul was considered a trading capital of the Ottoman Empire because of its location along the trade routes to India and the Mediterranean; it was also considered a political sub-capital.

== Local politics ==
The leadership was constantly plagued with accusations of corruption and incompetence, and leaders were replaced with an alarming regularity. Also, because of those problems, the administration of Mosul was entrusted to Palace and notable favorites, and the high officials' careers were usually determined by tribal issues within their states.

== See also ==
- 1918 Clemenceau–Lloyd George Agreement (Middle East)
- Treaty of Ankara (1926)
