= Treaty of Saadabad =

1937 treaty between Turkey, Iran, Iraq, and Afghanistan

The Treaty of Saadabad (or the Saadabad Pact) was a non-aggression pact signed by Turkey, Iran, Iraq, and Afghanistan on 8 July 1937, and lasted for five years. The treaty was signed in Tehran's Saadabad Palace and was part of an initiative for greater Middle Eastern-oriental relations spearheaded by King Mohammed Zahir Shah of Afghanistan. Ratifications were exchanged in Tehran on 25 June 1938, and the treaty became effective on the same day. It was registered in the League of Nations Treaty Series on 19 July 1938.

In Iraq, the left-leaning Bakr Sidqi military government of 1936–1937 was less Arab nationalist than other Iraqi governments. Sidqi was a Kurd and his prime minister, Hikmat Sulayman, was a Turkmen. They were therefore interested in diplomacy with Iraq's eastern, non-Arab neighbours. Turkey sought friendly relations with its neighbours and was still recovering from its defeat in World War I and the costly victory in the Turkish War of Independence.

In 1943, the treaty was automatically extended for a further five years because none of the signatories had renounced it. After the end of the extended treaty term, the pact officially ended.

== Background ==
=== Atatürk and the Turkish foreign policy ===
After World War I, and the fall of the Ottoman Empire, the Middle East saw the creation of several new independent states, one of the most significant of these being the Turkish Republic. A Turkish statesman named Mustafa Kemal Pasha (nicknamed Atatürk, meaning 'Father of the Turks') rose as the predominant figure in the politics of the fallen Turkish empire. Under Atatürk, The Republic of Turkey was officially established with Atatürk as its first President. Atatürk's reign as president of Turkey saw many reforms, such as industrialization, secularization, and a particular foreign policy. This involved diplomacy between Turkey with mutually beneficial trade, and established diplomatic ties between nations. Turkish diplomats were specifically concerned with the security and protection of Turkey's sovereign borders, including Turkey's southern border to the Middle East. Atatürk's administration would attempt to establish friendly relations with all bordering countries. In Europe, Turkey was able to do this by partaking in the Balkan Pact. Turkey hoped just as the Balkan Pact established friendly relations with European neighboring countries, that a similar treaty or alliance could establish friendly relations with neighboring Middle-Eastern states, as good diplomacy was already underway between Turkey, Iraq and Iran.

=== Zahir Shah's Middle Eastern diplomacy ===
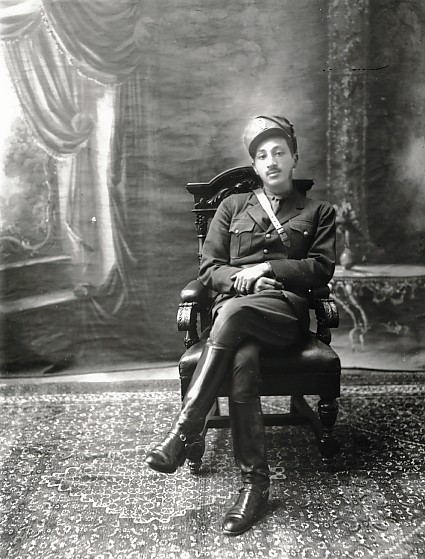
Mohammed Zahir Shah at a younger age.

Mohammed Zahir Shah, the last king of Afghanistan, had a policy of aiding neighboring Muslim countries and groups. For example, he provided weapons, aid, and support to the First East Turkestan Republic, and other Muslim Chinese Turkic groups, such as the Uyghurs and Dungans. Zahir Shah advocated for better Middle Eastern ties and a better cooperation in the Middle East. All four nations – Iraq, Iran, Turkey and Afghanistan were fearful of the encroaching colonial states, mainly the French in Syria and the British in India, Palestine, Oman and Yemen. With majority of the Middle East under colonial subjugation and the 'red threat' of the communist USSR in the North, it seemed that the uniting of Middle Eastern non-colonial states was the biggest priority to avoid an invasion similar to the Persian campaign in World War I. All these factors contributed to the need of a document to collect non-colonial Middle Eastern interests.

The League of Nations' Flag

=== Establishment of the League of Nations ===
The League of Nations was established on 10 January 1920. It was founded in the aftermath of World War I, and advocated for dialogue and diplomatic negotiations and relations between nations to avoid a repeat of the war. During the interwar period many networks of diplomacy formed as a result of the League of Nations platform for dialogue; this was one of the contributing factors of the betterment of relations between Iraq, Iran, Turkey and Afghanistan in the Treaty of Saadabad.

== Treaty signing and ratification ==
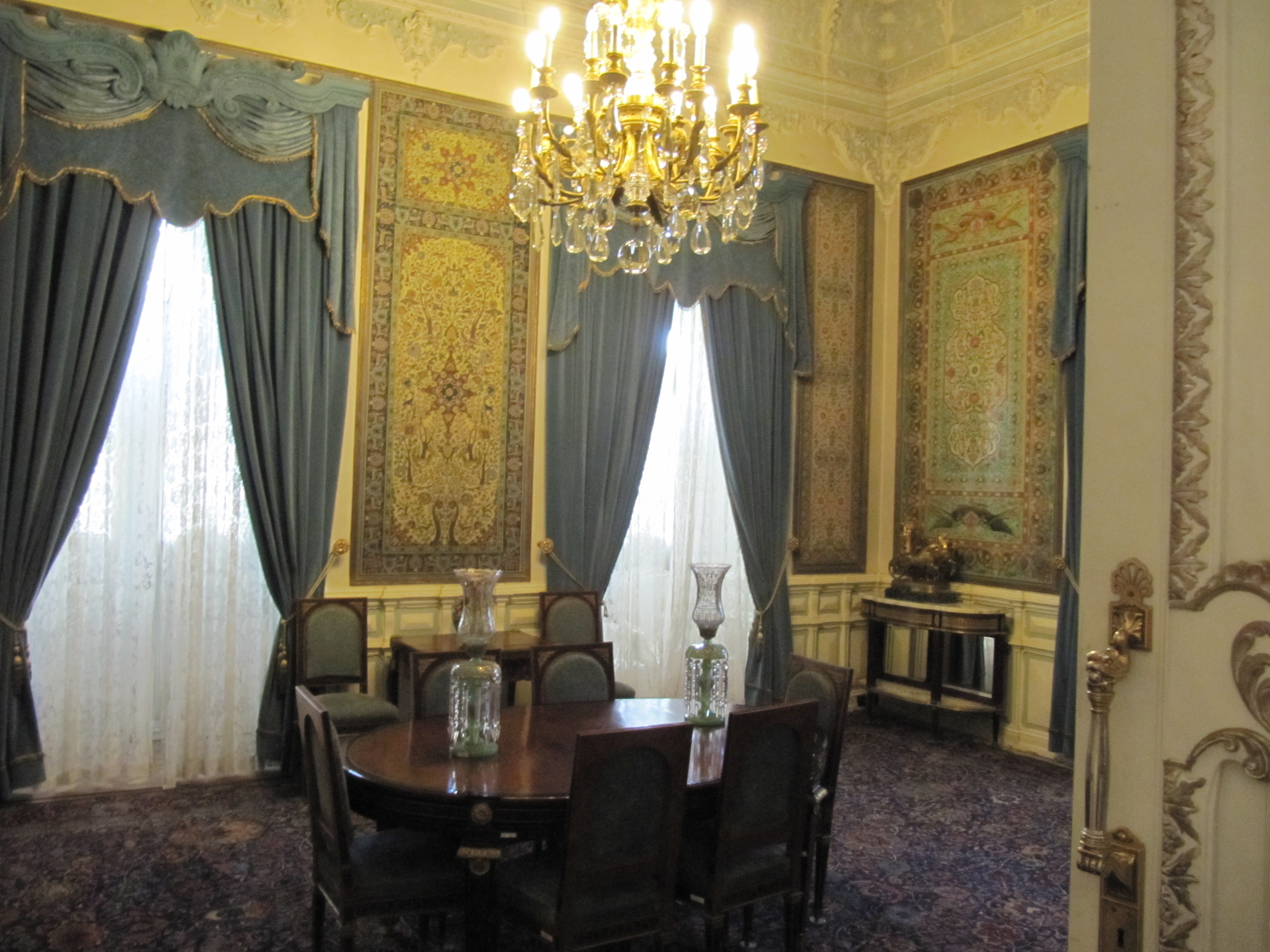
The Saadabad Palace in Tehran, Iran. The signing place of the treaty/pact.

The treaty was signed on 8 July 1937, and later ratified on 25 June 1938. The treaty's name is eponymous to the palace it was signed and ratified in the Sa'dabad Complex in Tehran, Iran. Not much is known about the treaty, due to many historians considering it insignificant in comparison to other world events in the Interwar period, such as the rise of Adolf Hitler in Germany. The Saadabad Treaty officially was signed as a non-aggression pact, in which international law forbade any of the signatories from acts of aggression toward one another, meaning Iraq, Turkey, Iran and Afghanistan declared that they would not act aggressively to one another and work on the betterment of their relations.

In 1943, the treaty was automatically extended for a further five years, because none of the signatories had renounced it. After the end of the extended treaty term, the pact officially ended.

== Lasting impact ==
The treaty's impact is not considered greatly significant, but it did play a part in establishing diplomatic channels between the modern day countries of the Middle East and was hoped to set a framework of security between minor nations at the time, and contributed to the neutrality of the four states in the Middle Eastern theater of World War II, until the Rashid Ali al-Gaylani government in Iraq.

Signatories of the Saadabad Pact/Treaty
| Turkey | Iran | Iraq | Afghanistan |
| Mustafa Kemal Atatürk | | | |
| Mustafa Kemal Atatürk | Reza Shah Pahlavi | Hikmat Sulayman | Mohammed Zahir Shah |
