= Mandatory Iraq =

British mandate territory (1921–1932)

Coordinates: 33°20′N 44°23′E

Kingdom of Iraq under British administration الانتداب البريطاني على العراق (Arabic)
- 1920–1932
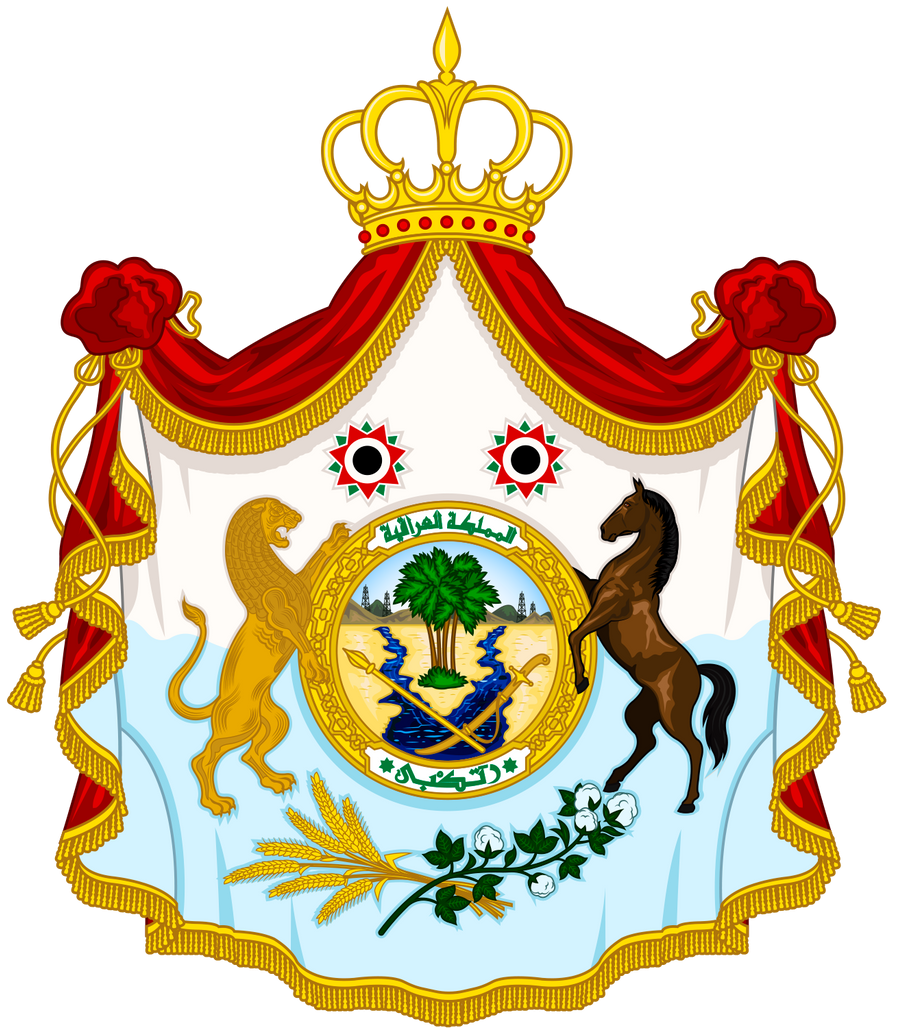
- Flag (1921–1924); Flag (1924–1932) Coat of arms (1931–1932)
- Anthem: (1924–1932) السلام الملكي; As-Salam al-Malaki "The Royal Salute"
- Union Flag

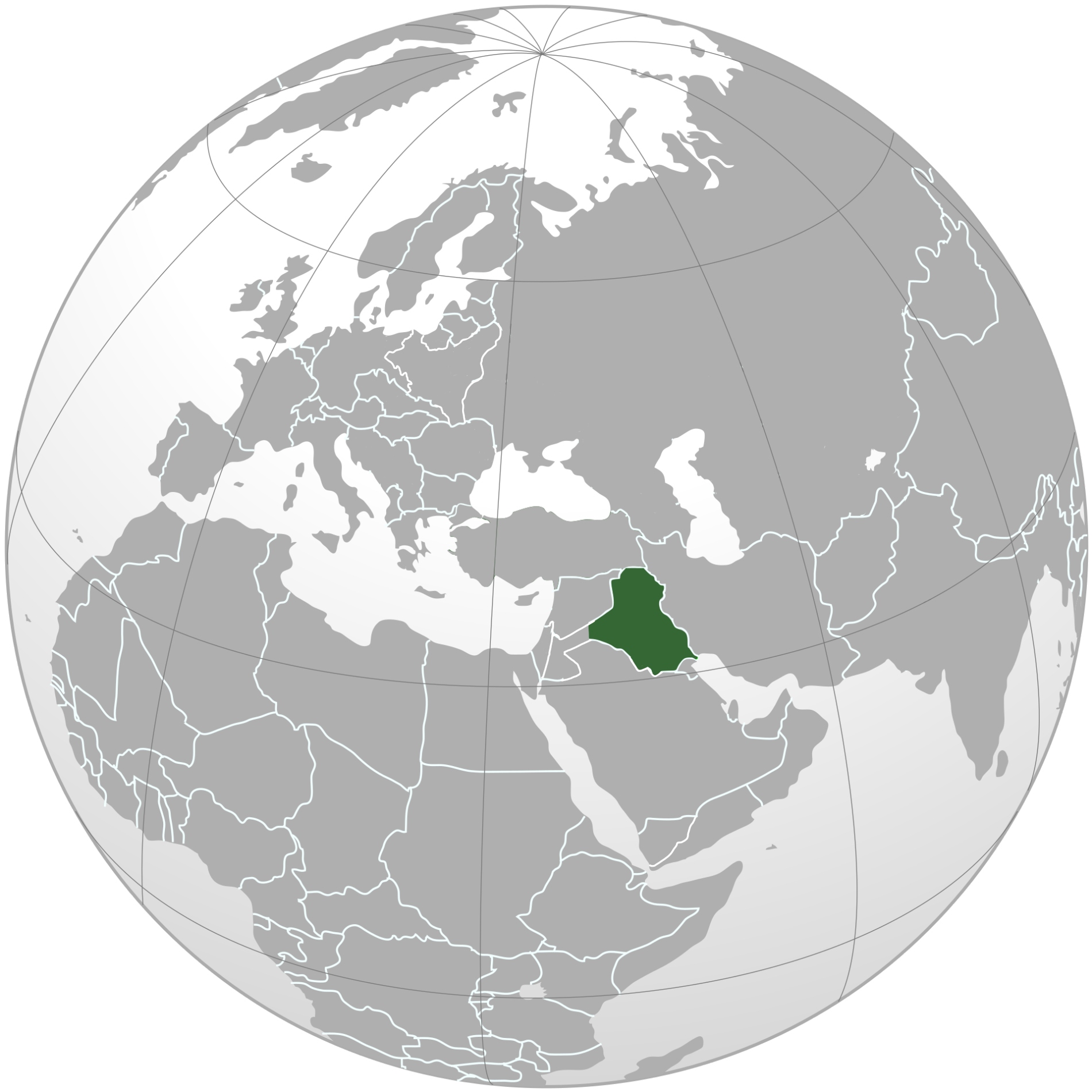
- Status: Class A League of Nations mandate of the United Kingdom
- Capital and largest city: Baghdad
- Common languages: Arabic · Kurdish; Armenian · Neo-Aramaic
- Religion: Islam · Christianity; Judaism · Yazidism; Mandaeism
- Demonym: Iraqi
- Government: Unitary parliamentary constitutional monarchy
- High Commissioner
  - 1921–1923: Percy Cox
  - 1923–1929: Henry Dobbs
  - 1929–1932: Francis Humphrys
- King
  - 1921–1932: Faisal I
- Prime Minister
  - 1920–1922 (first): Abd Al-Rahman Al-Gillani
  - 1930–1932 (last): Nuri al-Said
- Legislature: Parliament
  - Upper Chamber: Senate
  - Lower Chamber: Chamber of Deputies
- Historical era: Interwar period
  - San Remo conference: 25 April 1920
  - Treaty of Sèvres: 10 August 1920
  - Coronation of Faisal I: 23 August 1921
  - Treaty of Lausanne: 24 July 1923
  - Treaty of Ankara: 5 June 1926
  - Anglo-Iraqi Treaty: 30 June 1930
  - Independence: 3 October 1932
- Currency: Indian rupee
Preceded by	Succeeded by
Ottoman Iraq	Neutral territory zone; Kingdom of Iraq
- Today part of: Iraq; Saudi Arabia

The Kingdom of Iraq under British Administration, or Mandatory Iraq (Arabic: الانتداب البريطاني على العراق, romanized: al-Intidāb al-Brīṭānī ʿalā l-ʿIrāq), was created in 1921 after the 1920 Iraqi Revolt against the proposed British Mandate of Mesopotamia and was enacted via the 1922 Anglo-Iraqi Treaty and a 1924 undertaking by the United Kingdom to the League of Nations to fulfil the role as mandatory power.

Faisal ibn Husayn, who had been proclaimed King of Syria by the Syrian National Congress in Damascus in March 1920, was ejected by the French in July of the same year. Faisal was then granted by the British the territory of Iraq to rule it as a kingdom, with the British Royal Air Force (RAF) retaining certain military control, but de facto, the territory remained under British administration until 1932.

The civil government of postwar Iraq was headed originally by High Commissioner Sir Percy Cox, and his deputy, Colonel Arnold Wilson. British reprisals after the capture and killing of a British officer in Najaf failed to restore order. The British occupiers faced the growing strength of the nationalists, who continued to resist against the British authority. British administration had yet to be established in northern Iraq.

Although often thought to have been invented by the British after the First World War, Iraq had long existed as a distinct region under the Ottoman Empire, encompassing the provinces of Mosul, Baghdad and Basra and officially referred to as the 'Iraq Region'.

== History ==
=== Background ===
Contrary to the common belief that Iraq was invented by the British after the First World War, the region had long existed as a coherent administrative entity under the Ottoman Empire. As early as the 16th century, the Baghdad Eyalet encompassed districts such as Kerne in the south, Kasr-ı Şirin in the east, İmadiye and Zâho in the north and Ane and Deyrü Rahbe in the west and formed a territorial configuration that closely resembles the later borders of Mandatory Iraq. By the 17th century, the territory had been reorganised into four Ottoman eyalets: those of Baghdad, Basra, Mosul and Shahrizor. By the mid-19th century, Ottoman Iraq was divided into the three vilayets of Mosul, Baghdad, and Basra, which were frequently treated collectively in official Ottoman documents as the Iraq Region (Hıtta-i Irakiyye).

In 1850, a request to establish a provincial council (meclis-i kebîr) in Shahrizor was denied by the Sublime Porte, which noted that Shahrizor, although a separate province, was considered part of the Iraq Region and could therefore not establish a provincial council before the capital, Baghdad. In 1879, Mosul Governor Feyzi Pasha referred to the Mosul vilayet’s inclusion in the Hıtta-i Irakiyye in a telegram seeking tax relief, which indicated that the term was used in practice to describe a unified administrative space. That sense of territorial cohesion extended into imperial economic planning: a 1902 Ottoman railway concession contract described the project as intended "for the purpose of increasing the prosperity, development, wealth, and trade of Imperial Anatolia and of Iraq" (Turkish: Anadolu-yı Şâhâne ile hatta: Irak’ın tezyîd-i ma‘mûriyet ve terakkî-i servet ve ticâreti zımnında). The document listed Baghdad, Mosul and Basra among the Iraqi cities through which the railway would pass, which reflected Iraq's intended integration into the Ottoman imperial economy.

=== Early unrest ===
Three important anticolonial secret societies had been formed in Iraq during 1918 and 1919. The League of the Islamic Awakening (Jam'iyya an-naḥda al-islāmiyya) was organized at Najaf. The Muslim National League (al-Jam'iyya al-waṭaniyya al-islāmiyya) was formed with the objects of organising and mobilising the population for major resistance. In February 1919, in Baghdad, a coalition of Shia merchants, Sunni teachers, civil servants, Sunni and Shia ulama, and Iraqi officers formed the Guardians of Independence (Harās al-istiqlāl). The Guardians of Independence had member groups in Karbala, Najaf, Kut and Hillah.

The Grand Mujtahid of Karbala, Imam Shirazi, and his son, Mirza Muhammad Riza, began to organise the insurgent effort. Shirazi then issued a ruling, calling for a resistance against the British. By July 1920, Mosul was in rebellion against British rule, and the armed resistance moved south down the Euphrates River valley. The southern tribes, who cherished their long-held political autonomy, needed little inducement to join in the fray, but they did not cooperate in an organised effort against the British, which limited the effect of the revolt.

The 1920 Iraqi Revolt was a watershed event in contemporary Iraqi history. For the first time, Sunnis and Shias tribes and cities were brought together in a common effort. In the opinion of Hanna Batatu, the author of a seminal work on Iraq, the building of a nation-state in Iraq depended upon two major factors: the integration of Shias and Sunnis into the new body politic and the successful resolution of the age-old conflicts between the tribes and the riverine cities and among the tribes themselves over the food-producing flatlands of the Tigris and the Euphrates. The Iraqi Revolt brought those groups together, if only briefly, which constituted an important first step in the long and arduous process of forging a nation-state out of Iraq's conflict-ridden social structure. The Iraq Levies, a military force under British command, participated in the Kirkuk Massacre of 1924 of Kurds, Arabs and Turkomen. (See Simele Massacres of 1933)

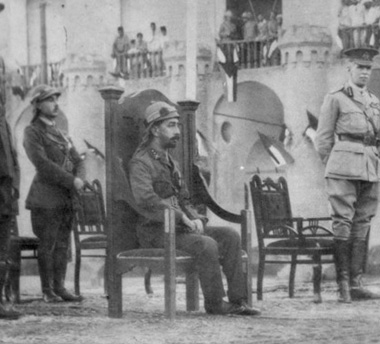
Coronation of Faisal as King of Iraq, who is seated. To his right are British High Commissioner Sir Percy Cox and Lieutenant Kinahan Cornwallis and to his is the left commander-in-chief of all British troops in the Mesopotamia Commander General Aylmer Haldane.

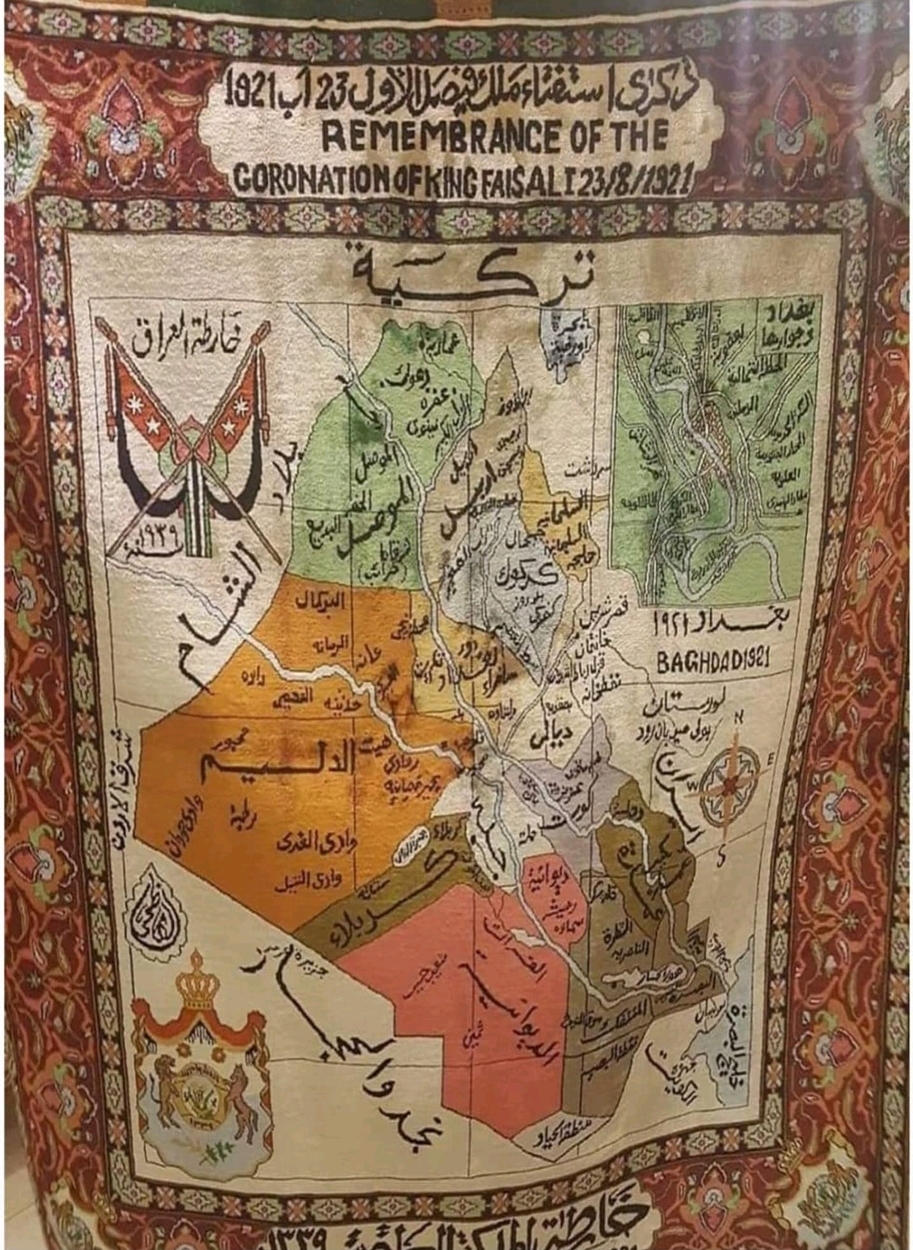
Mandatory Iraq, 1921. Remembrance flag of the coronation of King Faisal I

On 1 October 1922, the Royal Air Force (RAF) elements stationed in Iraq were reorganised into the RAF Iraq Command, which came about partially as a result of the 1920 revolt. The new command was designed primarily to suppress any threats to the Hashemite monarchy. Air control was considered by the British government as a more cost-effective method of controlling large areas of territory than land forces, an idea that was heavily promoted by the RAF officer Hugh Trenchard. During the 1920s and 1930s, the RAF Iraq Command participated in the suppression of numerous protests and revolts against the Hashemite monarchy. The British historian Elie Kedourie noted that "the North [of Iraq] as a whole had to be coerced [into submission] by the Royal Air Force." When the Kurdish leader Sheikh Mahmud launched an armed rebellion, the British used the newly-established Iraqi army to suppress the revolt, but that proved ineffective. The British then resorted to deploying the RAF, which suppressed the revolt. Meanwhile, rebellions by the Shia in the South of Iraqwere also suppressed by the RAF.

=== Coronation of Faisal ===
At the Cairo Conference of March 1921, the British set the parameters for Iraqi political life that were to continue until the 1958 Revolution. They chose as the first King of Iraq Hashemite, Faisal ibn Husayn, son of Sherif Hussein ibn Ali, a former Sharif of Mecca; they established an Iraqi army thought they kept Iraq Levies under direct British command; and they proposed a new treaty. To confirm Faisal as Iraq's first monarch, a plebiscite was carefully arranged that had a return of 96 percent in his favour. The British saw in Faisal a leader who possessed sufficient nationalist and Islamic credentials to have broad appeal but also was vulnerable enough to remain dependent on their support.

Faisal traced his descent from the family of Muhammad. His ancestors held political authority in the holy cities of Mecca and Medina since the 10th century. The British believed that those credentials would satisfy traditional Arab standards of political legitimacy and thought that he would be accepted by the growing Iraqi nationalist movement because of his role in the 1916 Arab Revolt against the Turks, his achievements as a leader of the Iraq emancipation movement and his general leadership qualities. Faisal was instated as the Kingof Iraq after the Naquib of Baghdad was disqualified as being too old (aged 80), and Sayid Talib (a prominent Iraqi from the province of Basra) was deported on trumped up-charges by the British. The voting was far from a reflection of the true feelings of the Iraqi people. Nevertheless, Faisal was considered the most effective choice for the throne by the British government.

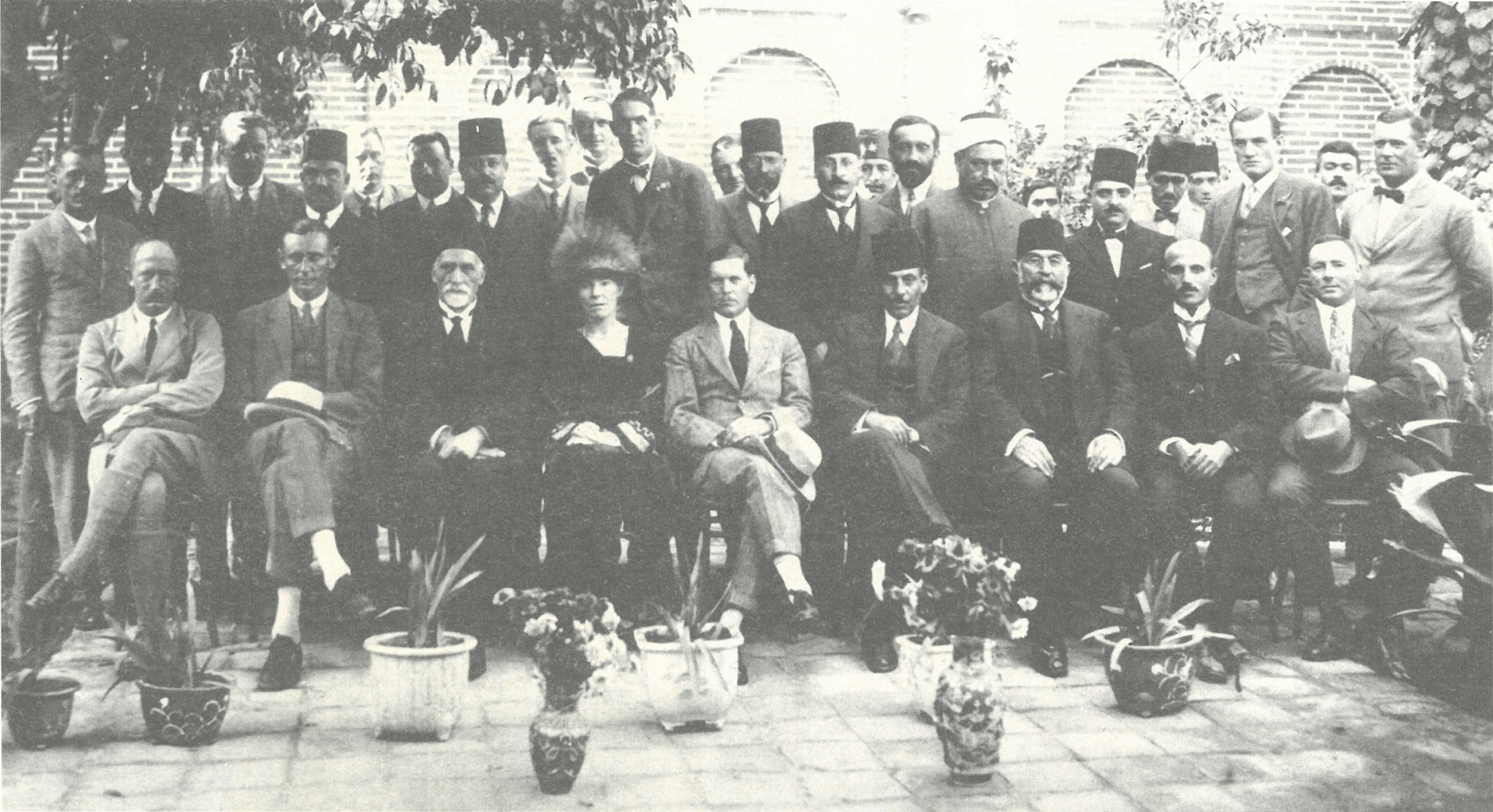
A photograph of British and Iraqi dignitaries in Baghdad from 1923 during the era of Mandatory Iraq. From second left to right in the front row, Kinahan Cornwallis, Sassoon Eskell, and Gertrude Bell. Bernard Henry Bourdillon stands directly behind Bell in the second row.

The final major decision taken at the Cairo Conference related to the Anglo-Iraqi Treaty of 1922. Faisal was under pressure from the nationalists and the anti-British mujtahids of Najaf and Karbala to limit both British influence in Iraq and the duration of the treaty. Recognizing that the monarchy depended on British support— and wishing to avoid a repetition of his experience in Syria, where the French had removed him, Faisal maintained a moderate approach in dealing with the British. The treaty, which had been originally set as a 20-year engagement but later reduced to four years, was ratified in June 1924 and stated that the King would heed British advice on all matters affecting British interests and on fiscal policy as long as Iraq had a balance of payments deficit with the British and that British officials would be appointed to specified posts in 18 departments to act as advisers and inspectors. A subsequent financial agreement, which significantly increased the financial burden on Iraq, required Iraq to pay half the cost of supporting British resident officials, among other expenses. British obligations under the new treaty included providing various kinds of aid, notably military assistance, and proposing Iraq for membership in the League of Nations at the earliest moment. In effect, the treaty ensured that Iraq would remain politically and economically dependent on the British. While unable to prevent the passing of the treaty, Faisal clearly felt that the British had gone back on their promises to him.

The British decision at the Cairo Conference to establish an indigenous Iraqi army was significant. In Iraq, as in most of the developing world, the military establishment was the best-organised institution in an otherwise-weak political system. Iraq's body politic crumbled under immense political and economic pressure throughout the monarchic period, but the military gained increasing power and influence, and because the officers in the new army were necessarily Sunnis who had served under the Ottomans, and the lower ranks were filled predominantly by Shia tribal elements, the Sunni dominance in the military was preserved.

=== Later years ===
The Anglo-Iraqi Treaty of 1930 provided for a "close alliance" for "full and frank consultations between the two countries in all matters of foreign policy" and for mutual assistance in case of war. Iraq granted the British the use of air bases near Basra and at Habbaniyah and the right to move troops across the country. The treaty, of 25 years' duration, was to come into force upon Iraq's admission to the League of Nations.

With the signing of the 1930 Treaty and the settling of the Mosul question, Iraqi politics took on a new dynamic. The emerging class of Sunni and Shia landowning tribal sheikhs vied for positions of power with wealthy and prestigious urban-based Sunni families and with Ottoman-trained army officers and bureaucrats. Because Iraq's newly-established political institutions were the creation of a foreign power, and the concept of democratic government had no precedent in Iraqi history, the politicians in Baghdad lacked legitimacy and never developed deeply-rooted constituencies. Thus, despite a constitution and an elected assembly, Iraqi politics was more a shifting alliance of important personalities and cliques than a democracy in the Western sense. The absence of broadly-based political institutions inhibited the early nationalist movement's ability to make deep inroads into Iraq's diverse social structure.

Mandatory Iraq's administration continued to operate until 1932.

In 1936 and 1937, various protests and revolts broke out against the Iraqi government, with the main issues centering around agrarian issues and conscription into the armed forces. They were suppressed by the Iraqi government with assistance from the RAF Iraq Command, with Kedourie writing that the "killing, it seems, was indiscriminate, and old men, women and children were the victims". An armed revolt which broke out in 1937 over agrarian issues and conscription was also "put down with the help of indiscriminate aerial bombing". During these disturbances, Shia religious leaders were expelled from Iraq for being Persians. Kedourie describes the monarchy as despotic, with a record "full of bloodshed, treason and rapine", and states that "however pitiful its end we may know that it was implicit in its beginning".

In his assessment of the British mandate and the Iraqi monarchy, the Iraqi-American historian Kanan Makiya considers the British mandate and its institutions more as "agents of modernisation" than colonialism:

The British mandate and the institutions it gave rise to in Iraq, were the agents of a modernisation that did not arise gradually or indigenously as the outcome of a population’s own resourcefulness and engagement with the world. The British in Iraq were modernisers more than colonisers, despite acting out of self-interest.

Kedourie's judgement, however, is different:

When we consider the long experience of Britain in the government of Eastern countries, and set beside it the miserable polity which she bestowed on the populations of Mesopotamia, we are seized with rueful wonder. It is as though India and Egypt had never existed, as though Lord Cornwallis, Munro and Metcalf, John and Henry Lawrence, Milner and Cromer had attempted in vain to bring order, justice and security to the East, as though Burke and Macaulay, Bentham and James Mill had never addressed their intelligence to the problems and prospects of oriental government. We can never cease to marvel how, in the end, all this was discarded... [in] Mesopotamia.

If Makiya is referring to economic development in his account of Britain's modernising legacy in Iraq, an authoritative study demonstrates that Iraq's productivity in agriculture, the most important sector at the time, in fact declined from 275 kg per acre in 1920 to an average of 238 kg per acre between 1953 and 1958.

Under the British mandate, a new ruling class of "government shaikhs" was created. "Many of them", reported Major Pulley to the British commissioner in Baghdad in 1920, "were small men of no account until we made them powerful and rich". Civil Commissioner Wilson reported on his part that the Shaikhs "were in most cases directly dependent on the civil administration for the positions they held; realising that their positions entailed corresponding obligations, they co-operated actively with the political officers".

A dispatch by a British official to London in 1928 had a description of how the electoral system worked: the government's provincial governors were in fact election agents who drew up lists of those to be elected and of those who would do the electing. Elections to "the chamber of deputies and appointments to the senate," comments Keeourie, "were an additional weapon in the hands of the government wherewith the better to control the country".

== Independence ==
On 3 October 1932, the Kingdom of Iraq became an independent state. Ruled by the Hashemites, it lasted until 1958. However, Britain retained its military bases in Iraq, and British influence after independence resulted in instability for the monarchy. Before the monarchy's collapse in 1958, a series of coups took place in 1936 and 1941. The latter was followed by a brief British occupation.

== Economy ==
Nomadic Bedouin tribes within Iraq, which had traded all throughout the Middle East, became confined to trading within the borders of the mandate itself. That decision by the colonial administration proved economically troubling and devastating for the Bedouins.

=== Oil concession ===
Before the collapse of the Ottoman Empire, the British-controlled Turkish Petroleum Company (TPC) had held concessionary rights to the Mosul wilaya (province). Under the 1916 Sykes-Picot Agreement between Britain and France, which delineated future control of the Middle East, the area would have fallen under French influence. In 1919, however, the French relinquished their claims to Mosul under the terms of the San Remo Agreement, which granted the French a 25% share in the TPC as compensation.

Beginning in 1923, British and Iraqi negotiators held acrimonious discussions over the new oil concession. The major obstacle was Iraq's insistence on a 20% equity participation in the company; this figure had been included in the original TPC concession to the Turks and had been agreed upon at San Remo for the Iraqis. In the end, despite strong nationalist sentiments against the concession agreement, the Iraqi negotiators acquiesced to it. The League of Nations was soon to vote on the disposition of Mosul, and the Iraqis feared that without British support, Iraq would lose the area to Turkey. In March 1925, an agreement was concluded that contained none of the Iraqi demands. The TPC, now renamed the Iraq Petroleum Company (IPC), was granted a full and complete concession for a period of 75 years.

== Government ==
Mandatory Iraq also had a centralised unitary system of government, with British maintenance and support. The constitution stated that Iraq would operate under a constitutional monarchy, along with a parliamentary system, but in reality, the King had more power than the Parliament.

== British High Commissioners ==
- 1920–1923: Major-General Sir Percy Cox
- 1923–1928: Sir Henry Dobbs
- 1928–1929: Brigadier-General Sir Gilbert Clayton
- 1929–1932: Lieutenant Colonel Sir Francis Humphrys

== See also ==
- Guardians of Independence
- Mesopotamian campaign
- Ottoman Iraq
- RAF Iraq Command
