= Cozzens =

Cozzens is a surname. Notable people with the surname include:

- Andrew Cozzens (born 1968), American prelate of the Roman Catholic Church
- Donald Cozzens (1939–2021), American Roman Catholic priest, former president-rector and professor of pastoral theology
- Frederick Swartwout Cozzens (1818–1869), American humorist
- James Gould Cozzens (1903–1978), American novelist
- Mildred Cozzens Turner (1897–1992) American artist, composer and singer
- William C. Cozzens (1811–1876), American politician

== See also ==
- Cozzens House Hotel, later known as the Canfield House, a pioneer hotel in Omaha, Nebraska, United States
