= Mount Auburn Cemetery =

Historic cemetery in Massachusetts

- U.S. National Register of Historic Places
- U.S. National Historic Landmark District
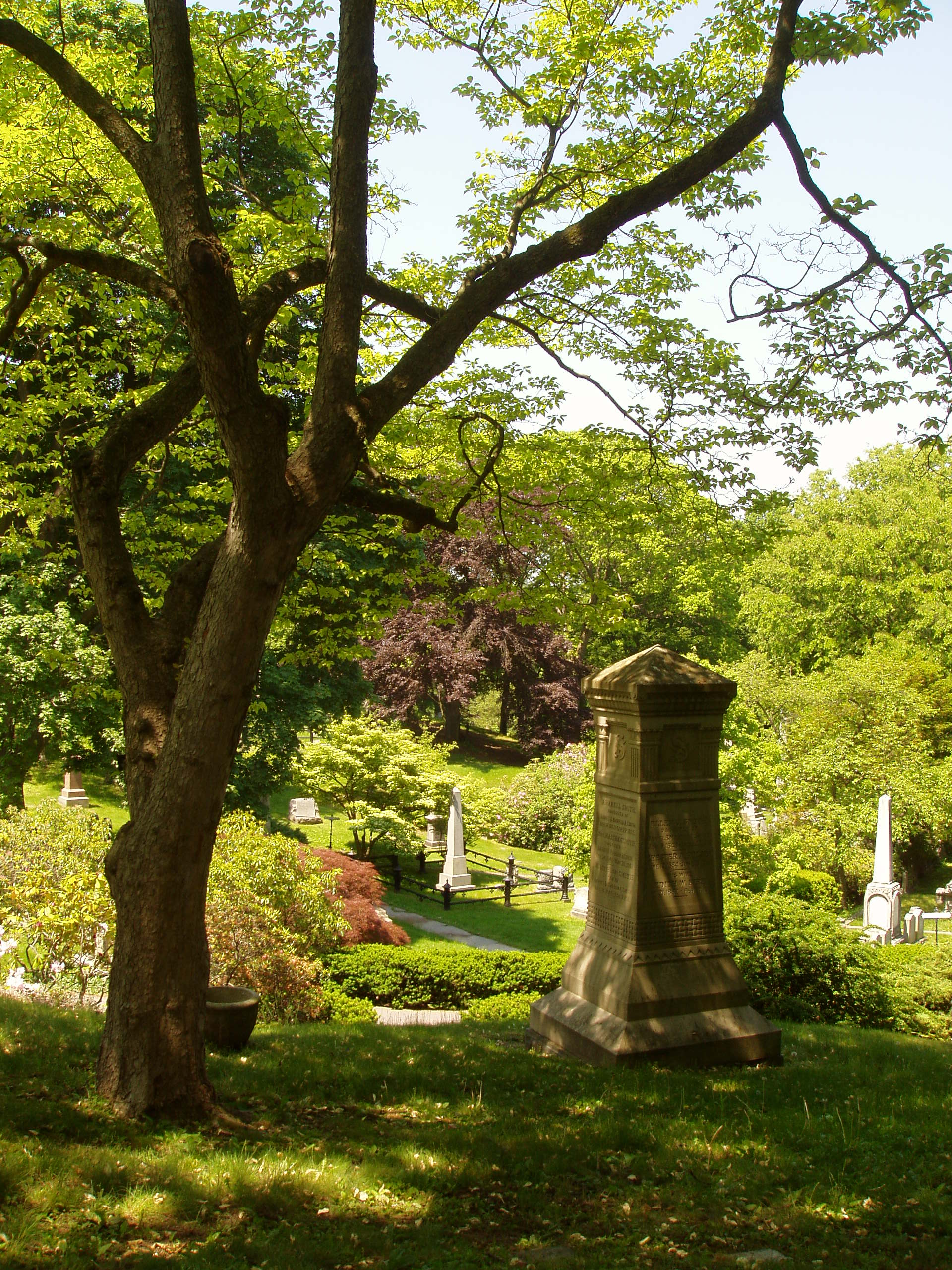
- The cemetery in 2005

- Location within Massachusetts Location within the United States
- Interactive map showing the location for Mount Auburn Cemetery
- Location: 580 Mount Auburn Street, Cambridge, Massachusetts, U.S.
- Coordinates: 42°22′16″N 71°08′41″W
- Built: 1831
- Architect: Alexander Wadsworth and Jacob Bigelow
- Architectural style: Exotic Revival, Other, Gothic Revival
- Website: https://mountauburn.org/
- NRHP reference No.: 75000254

Significant dates
- Added to NRHP: April 21, 1975
- Designated NHLD: May 27, 2003

Mount Auburn Cemetery, located in Cambridge and Watertown, Massachusetts, is the first rural or garden cemetery in the United States. It is the burial site of many prominent Boston Brahmins, and is a National Historic Landmark District.

Dedicated in 1831 and set with classical monuments in a rolling landscaped terrain, it marked a distinct break with Colonial-era burying grounds and church-affiliated graveyards. The appearance of this type of landscape coincides with the rising popularity of the term "cemetery," derived from the Greek for "a sleeping place," instead of graveyard. This language and outlook eclipsed the previous harsh view of death and the afterlife embodied by old graveyards and church burial plots.

Mount Auburn Cemetery can be considered a link between Capability Brown's 18th century English landscape gardens and Frederick Law Olmsted and Calvert Vaux's Central Park in New York (1857-1876).

The 174-acre (70 ha) cemetery is important both for its historical aspects and for its role as an arboretum. It is Watertown's largest contiguous open space and extends into Cambridge to the east, adjacent to the Cambridge City Cemetery and Sand Banks Cemetery. It was designated a National Historic Landmark District in 2003 for its pioneering role in 19th-century cemetery development.

== History ==
Guide Through Mount Auburn, published in 1854

The land that became Mount Auburn Cemetery was originally named Stone's Farm, though locals referred to it as "Sweet Auburn" after the 1770 poem "The Deserted Village" by Oliver Goldsmith. Mount Auburn Cemetery was inspired by Père Lachaise Cemetery in Paris and was itself an inspiration to cemetery designers, most notably at Green-Wood Cemetery in Brooklyn (1838), Hollywood Cemetery in Richmond, Virginia, and Abney Park in London. Mount Auburn Cemetery was designed largely by Henry Alexander Scammell Dearborn with assistance from Jacob Bigelow and Alexander Wadsworth.

Bigelow came up with the idea for Mount Auburn as early as 1825, though a site was not acquired until five years later. Bigelow, a medical doctor, was concerned about the unhealthiness of burials under churches as well as the possibility of running out of space. With help from the Massachusetts Horticultural Society – which selected the flowers, trees and shrubs for the grounds – Mount Auburn Cemetery was founded on 70 acres (28 hectares) of land authorized by the Massachusetts Legislature for use as a garden or rural cemetery. The original land cost US$6,000 (equivalent to $181,406 in 2025); it was later extended to 170 acres (69 hectares). The main gate was built in the Egyptian Revival style and cost US$10,000 (equivalent to $302,344 in 2025).

The first president of the Mount Auburn Association, Supreme Court Justice Joseph Story, dedicated the cemetery on September 24, 1831. In Story's dedication address, he described the cemetery as a spititual landscape poised between heaven and earth, within which people could learn from the past by directly encountering the deeds of the great, thus connecting the present to the past in the face of dangerous change. Historian Leo Marx describes this as a "middle landscape," which historian Mark S. Schantz calls "a kind of pastoral ideal situated somewhere between the howling forces of raw nature and the corrupting taint of refined civilization." A visit to a rural cemetery, writes Schantz, was designed to be "mystical, emotional, and pleasurable", with the goal, in Story's words, to "cultivate feelings and sentiments more worthy of ourselves, and more worthy of christianity." In this way rural cemeteries contributed to a place of comfort for mourners, and a refuge and sanctuary for its many visitors.

Story's speech set the model for many more such addresses in the following three decades. Garry Wills focuses on it as an important precursor to President Abraham Lincoln's Gettysburg Address.

The Mount Auburn Cemetery is credited as the beginning of the American public parks and gardens movement. It set the style for other suburban American cemeteries such as Laurel Hill Cemetery (Philadelphia, Pennsylvania, 1836), Mount Hope Cemetery (Bangor, Maine, 1834), the country's second oldest garden cemetery; Green-Wood Cemetery (Brooklyn, New York, 1838), Green Mount Cemetery (Baltimore, Maryland, 1839) Mount Hope Cemetery (Rochester, New York, 1838), Lowell Cemetery (Lowell, Massachusetts, 1841), Allegheny Cemetery (Pittsburgh, Pennsylvania, 1844), Albany Rural Cemetery (Menands, New York, 1844), Swan Point Cemetery (Providence, Rhode Island, 1846), Spring Grove Cemetery (Cincinnati, Ohio, 1844), Forest Hills Cemetery (Jamaica Plain, Massachusetts, 1848) and Oakwood Cemetery (Syracuse, New York, 1859), plus others in Cave Hill, Kentucky, Savannah, Georgia, and Little Rock, Arkansas. By the close of the 1850s, one contemporary observer noted that there was "hardly a city or town of any size in the union which does not possess its rural cemetery."

Mount Auburn was established at a time when Americans had a sentimental interest in rural cemeteries. It is still well known for its tranquil atmosphere and accepting attitude toward death. Many of the more traditional monuments feature poppy flowers, symbols of blissful sleep. In the late 1830s, its first unofficial guide, Picturesque Pocket Companion and Visitor's Guide Through Mt. Auburn, was published and featured descriptions of some of the more interesting monuments as well as a collection of prose and poetry about death by writers including Nathaniel Hawthorne and Willis Gaylord Clark.

Because of the number of visitors, the cemetery's developers carefully regulated the grounds: they had a policy to remove "offensive and improper" monuments and only "proprietors" (i.e., plot owners) could have vehicles on the grounds and were allowed within the gates on Sundays and holidays. However, Mount Auburn differed from previously established cemeteries in that it was open to the general public and was not restricted to specific religious groups, reflecting the growing religious pluralism of Boston during the time.

In the 1840s, Mount Auburn was considered one of the most popular tourist destinations in the nation, along with Niagara Falls and Mount Vernon. A 16-year-old Emily Dickinson wrote about her visit to Mount Auburn in a letter in 1846. Approximately 60,000 people visited the cemetery in 1848 alone.

== Buildings ==
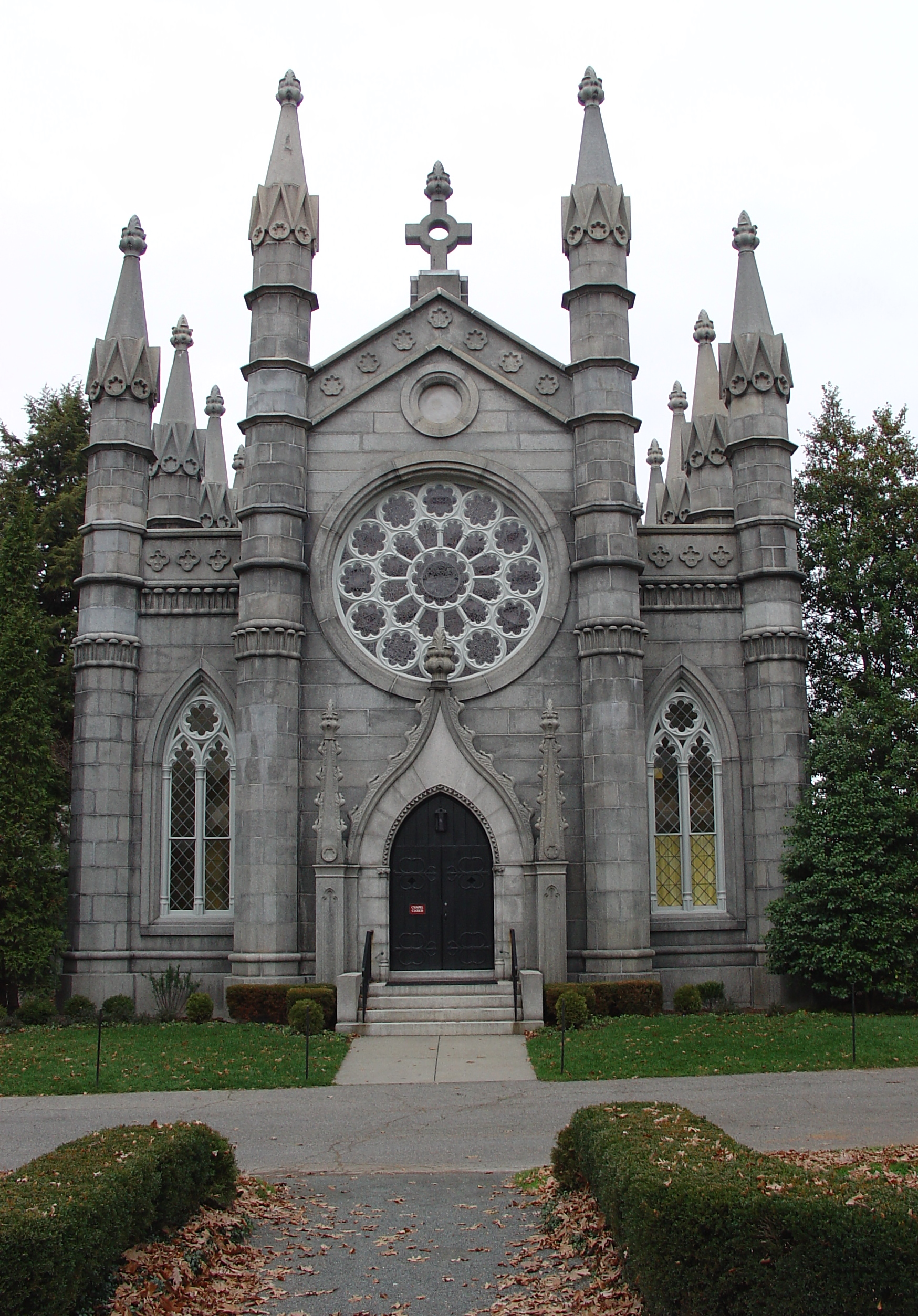
Bigelow Chapel

The cemetery has three notable buildings on its grounds. Washington Tower was designed by Bigelow and built in 1852–54. Named for George Washington, the 62-foot (19 m) tower was built of Quincy granite and provides excellent views of the area. Bigelow Chapel was built in the 1840s and rebuilt in the 1850s, also of Quincy granite, and was renovated in 1899 under the direction of architect Willard Sears to accommodate a crematorium. Its interior was again renovated in 1924 by Allen & Collens. Through all of these alterations, stained-glass windows by the Scottish firm of Allan & Ballantyne were preserved.

In 1870 the cemetery trustees, feeling the need for additional function space, purchased land across Mount Auburn Street and constructed a reception house. This building was supplanted in the 1890s by the construction of the Story Chapel and Administration Building, adjacent to the main gate. The first reception house was designed by Nathaniel J. Bradlee, and is listed on the National Register of Historic Places, separate from the cemetery's own listing. The second building was designed by Willard Sears, and is built of Potsdam sandstone in what Sears characterized as "English Perpendicular Style". The chapel in this building was redecorated in 1929 by Allen & Collens to include stained-glass by New England artist Earl E. Sanborn.

== Today ==
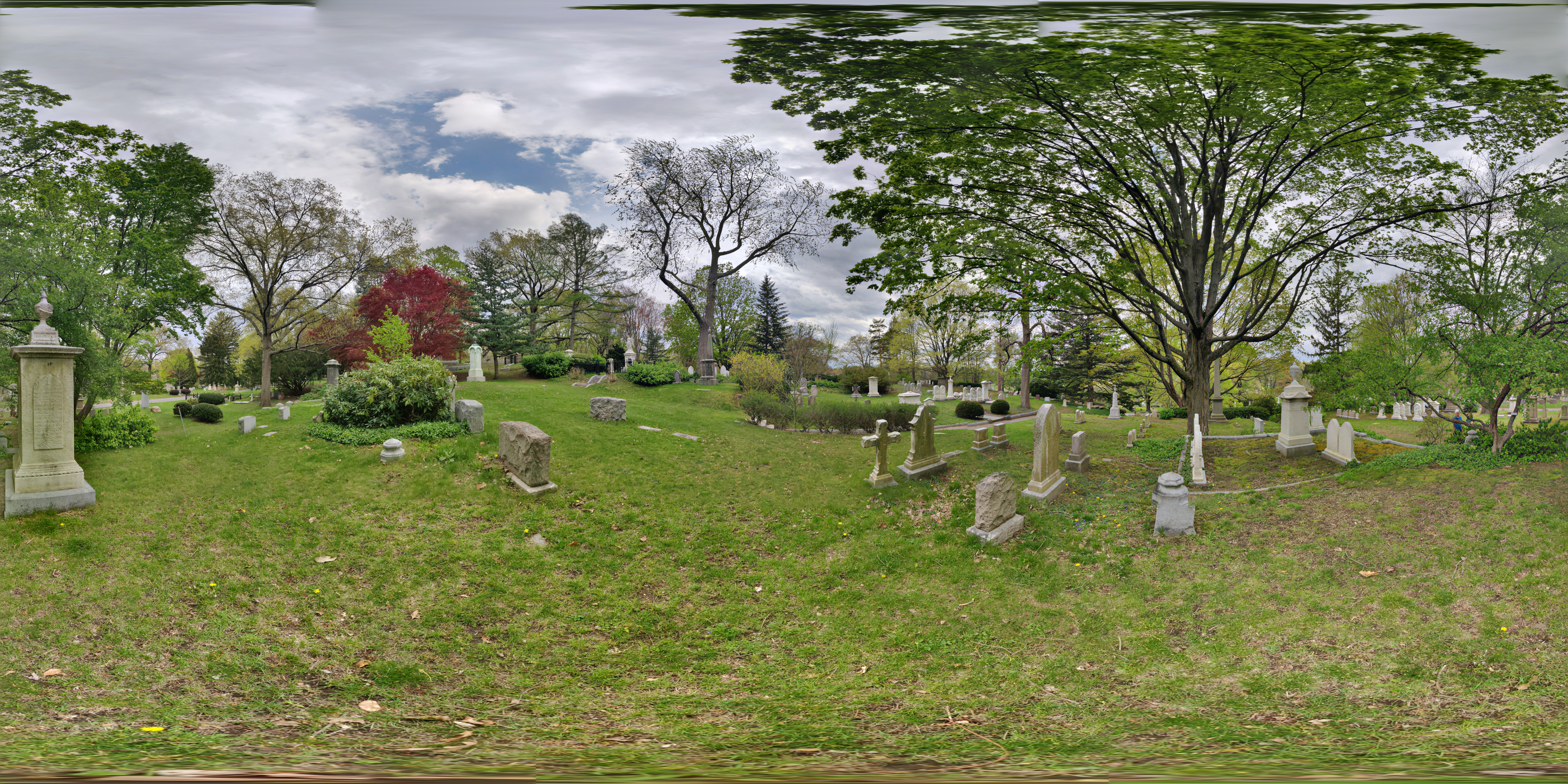
Mount Auburn Cemetery (view as a 360° interactive panorama)

More than 93,000 people are buried in the cemetery as of 2003. A number of historically significant people have been interred there since its inception, particularly members of the Boston Brahmins and the Boston elite associated with Harvard University, as well as a number of prominent Unitarians. The cemetery is nondenominational and continues to make space available for new plots.

The area is well known for its beautiful environs and is a favorite location for bird-watchers; over 220 species of birds have been observed at the cemetery since 1958.

Mount Auburn's collection of over 5,500 trees includes nearly 700 species and varieties. Thousands of very well-kept shrubs and herbaceous plants weave through the cemetery's hills, ponds, woodlands, and clearings. The cemetery contains more than 10 miles (17 km) of roads and many paths. Landscaping styles range from Victorian-era plantings to contemporary gardens, from natural woodlands to formal ornamental gardens, and from sweeping vistas through majestic trees to small enclosed spaces. Many trees, shrubs, and herbaceous plants are tagged with botanic labels containing their scientific and common names.

Guided tours of the cemetery's historic, artistic, and horticultural points of interest are offered.

The cemetery was among those profiled in the 2005 PBS documentary A Cemetery Special.

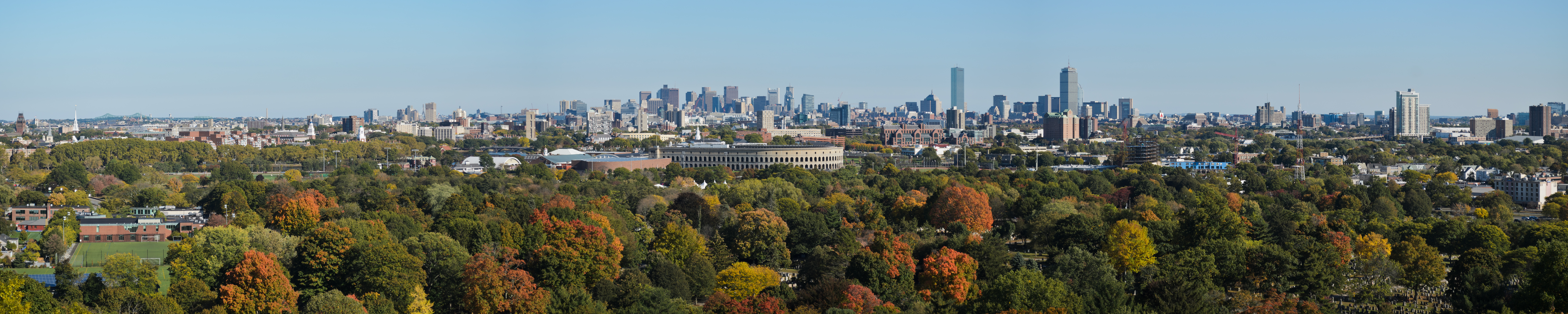
A panoramic view of the Downtown Boston skyline as seen from Washington Tower at the cemetery

== Photo gallery ==
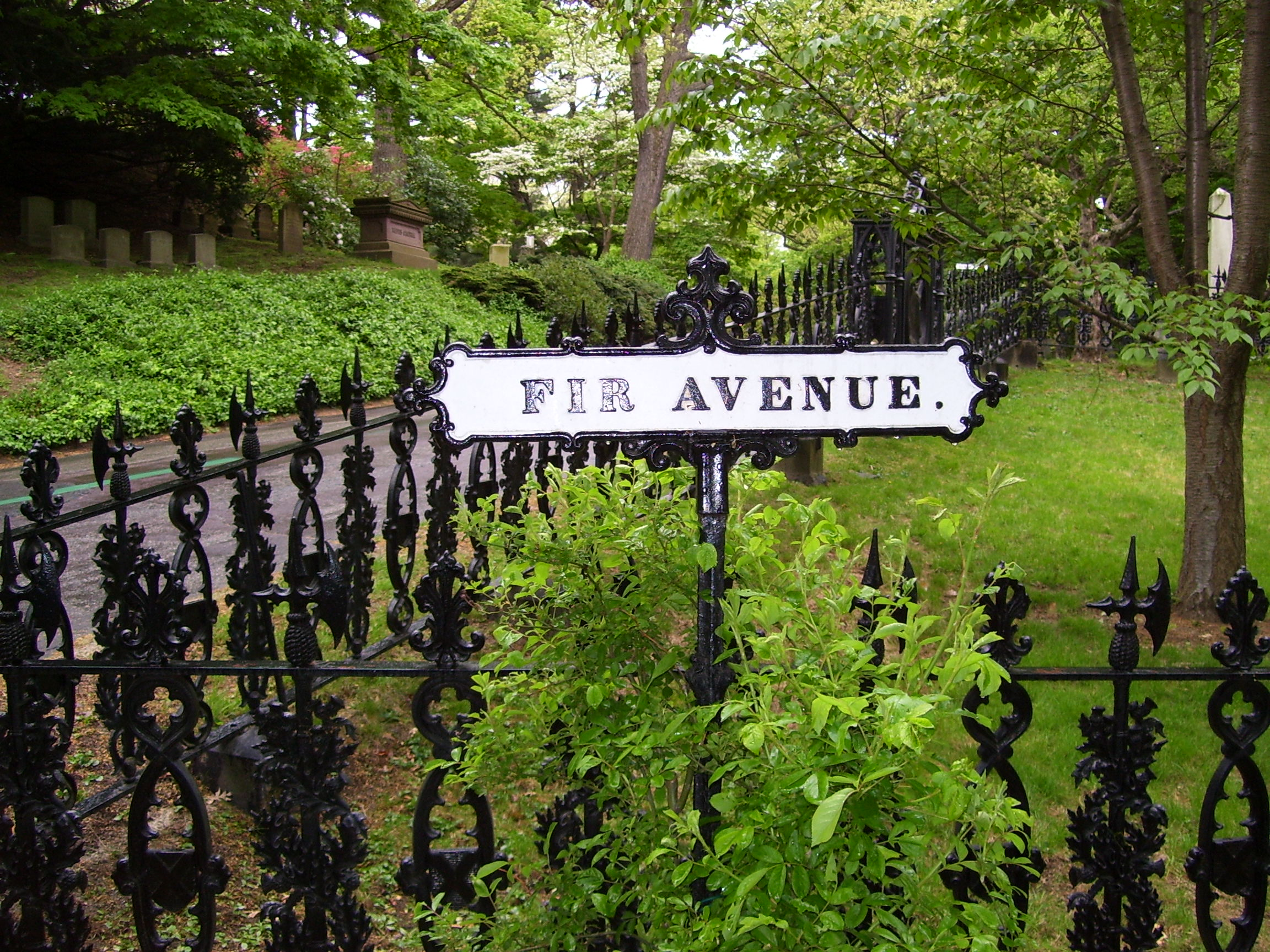
Fir Avenue mark in cemetery

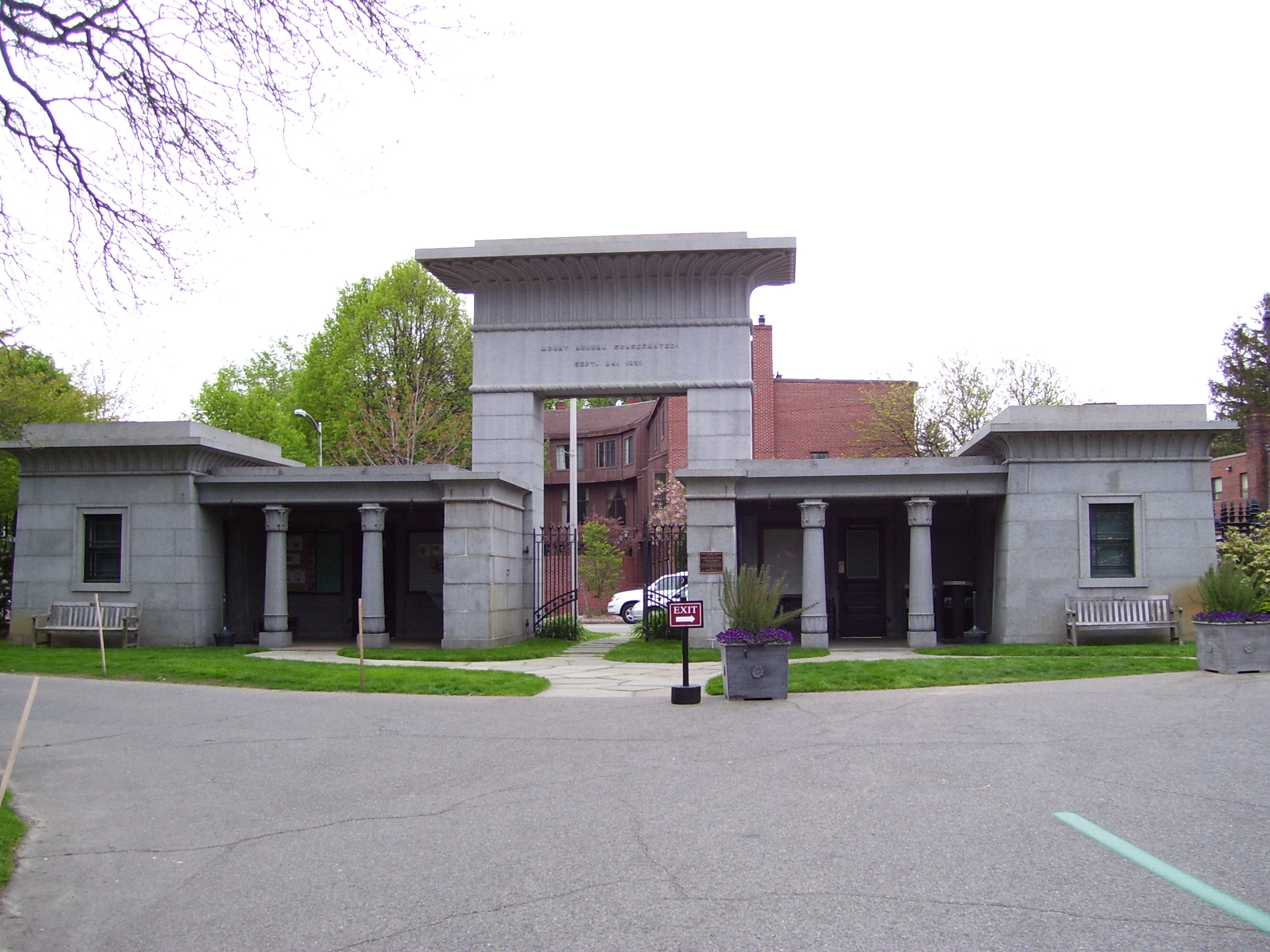
Egyptian revival entrance to Mount Auburn Cemetery

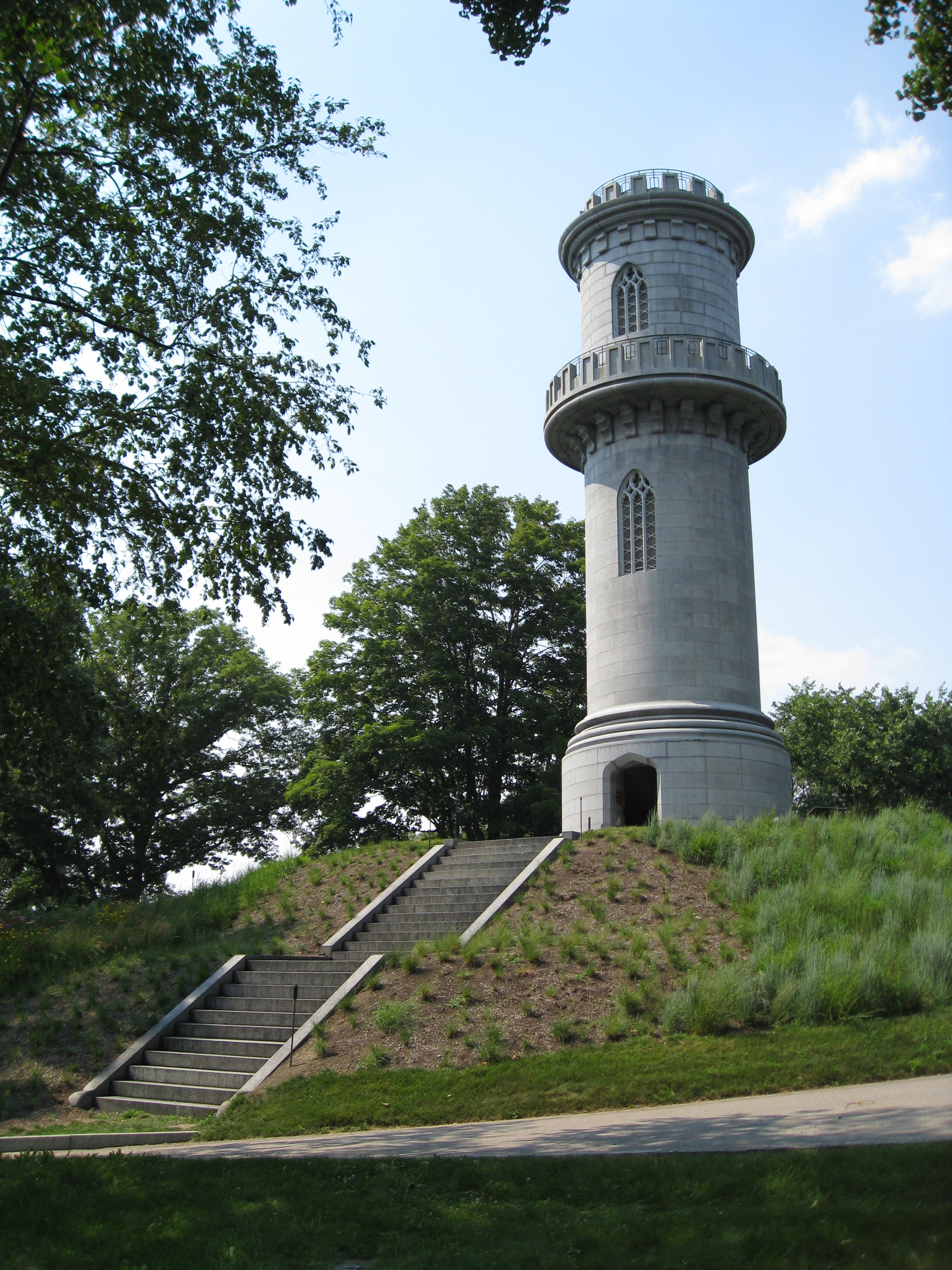
The Washington Tower in the cemetery

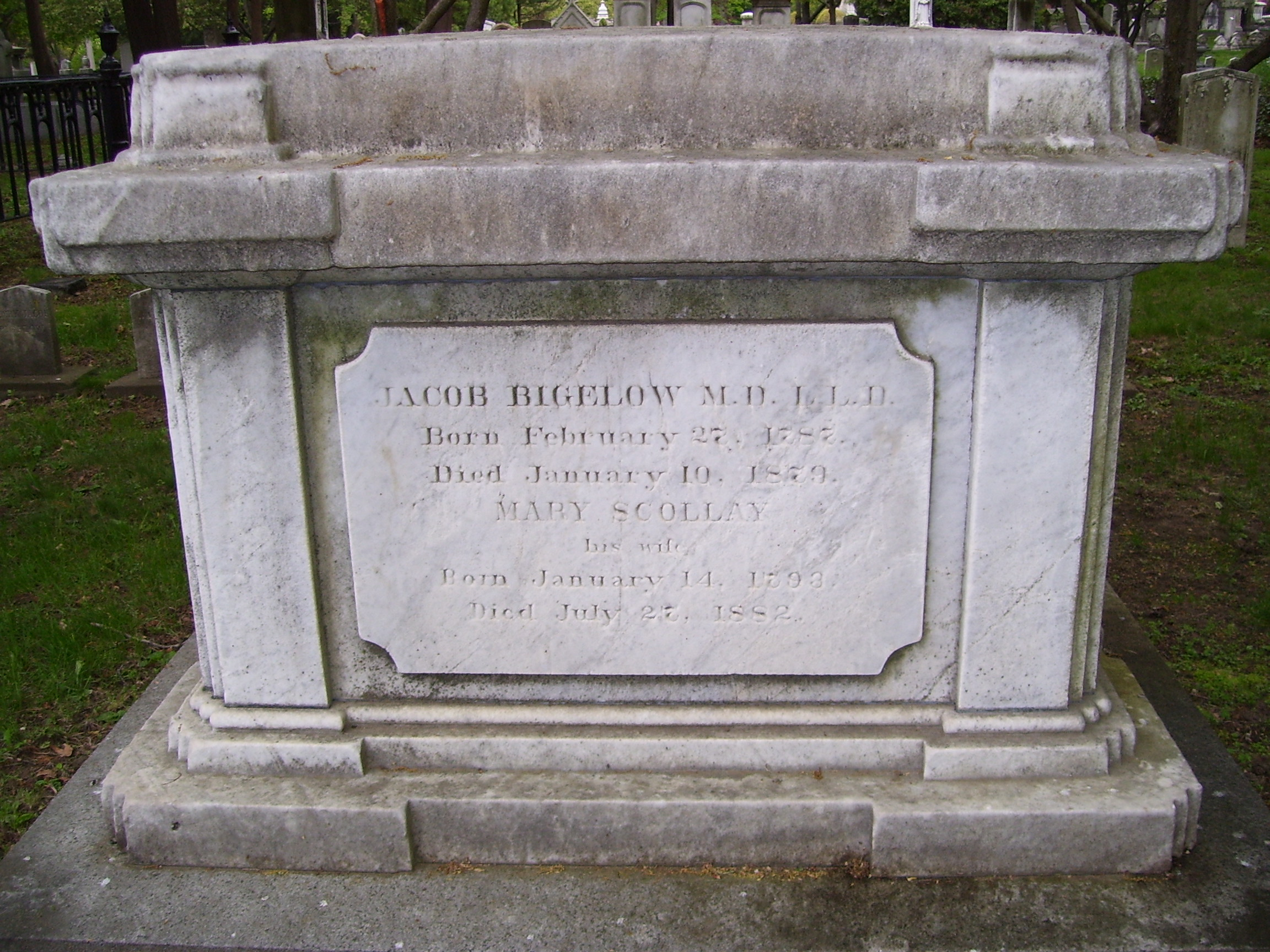
Cemetery designer, Dr. Jacob Bigelow's grave

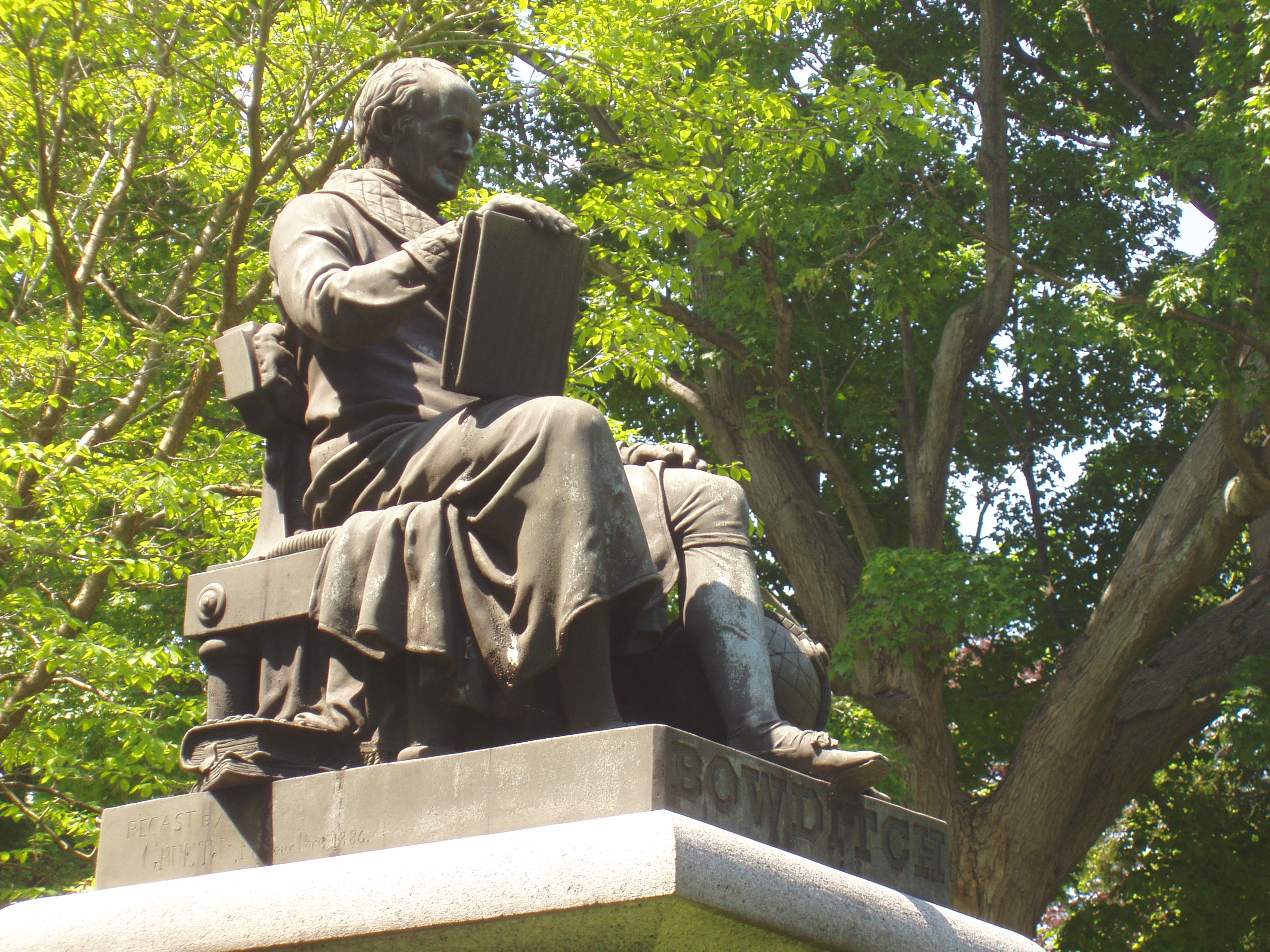
Nathaniel Bowditch

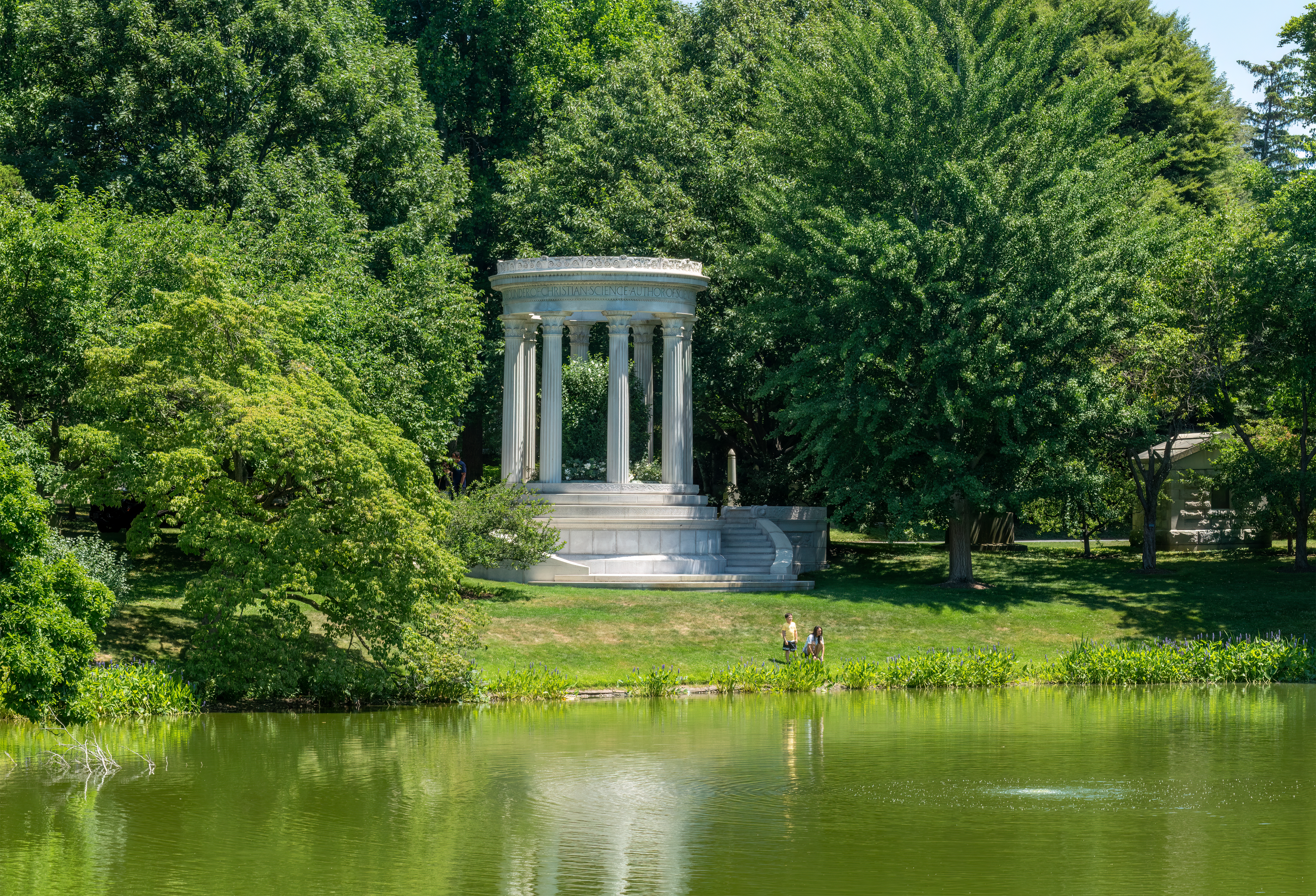
Mary Baker Eddy Memorial

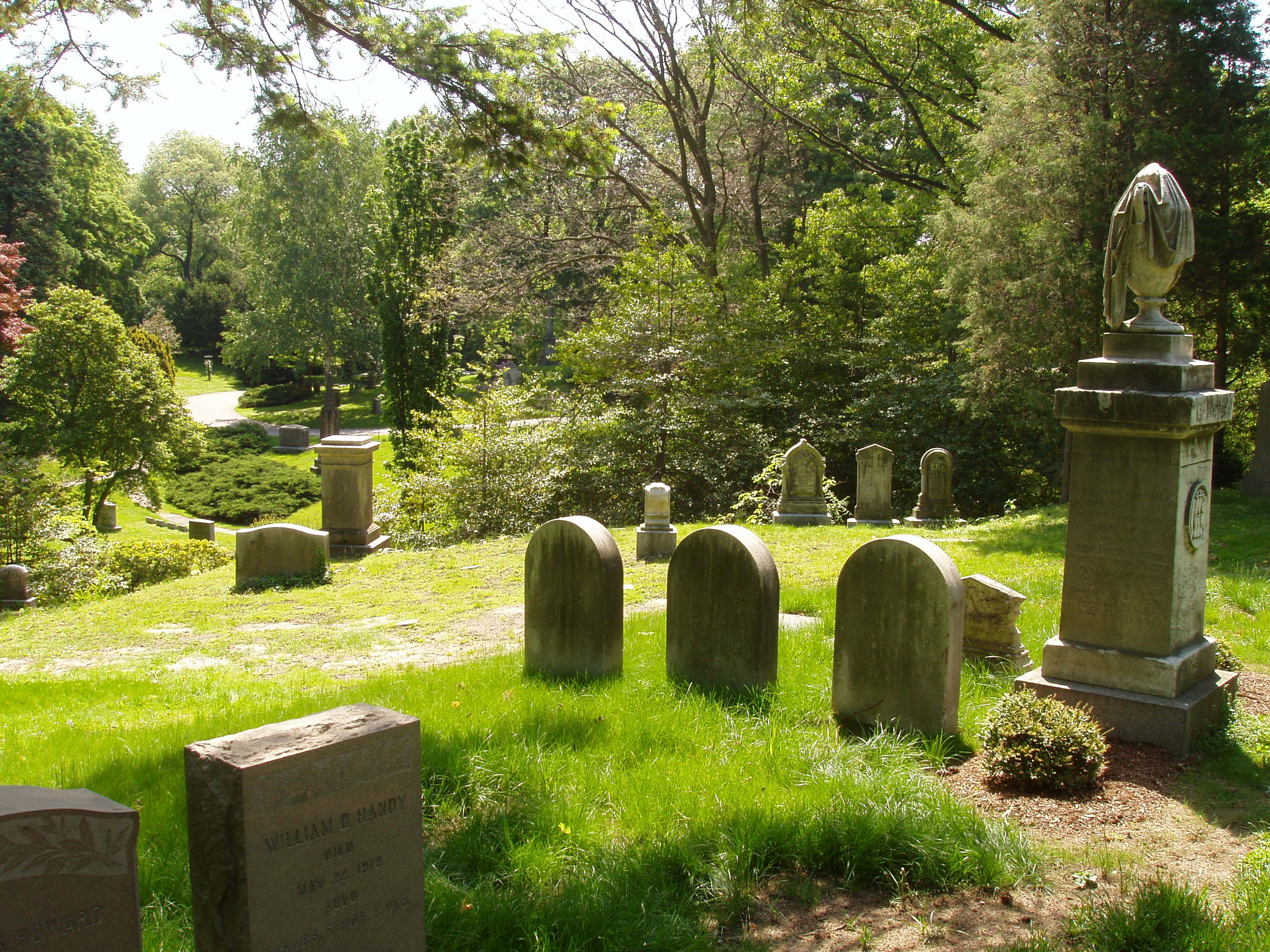
Mount Auburn Cemetery

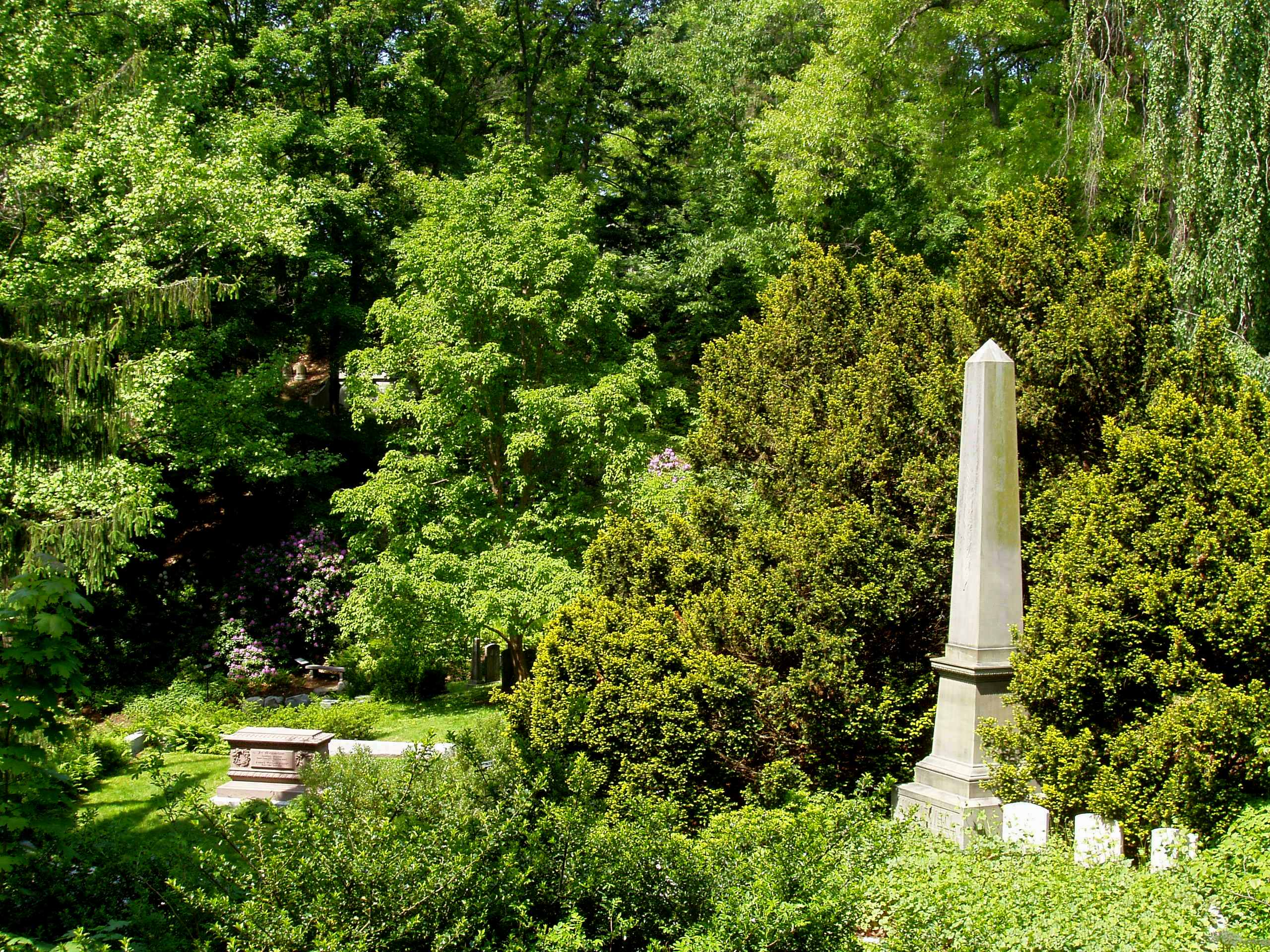
Hunnewell family obelisk

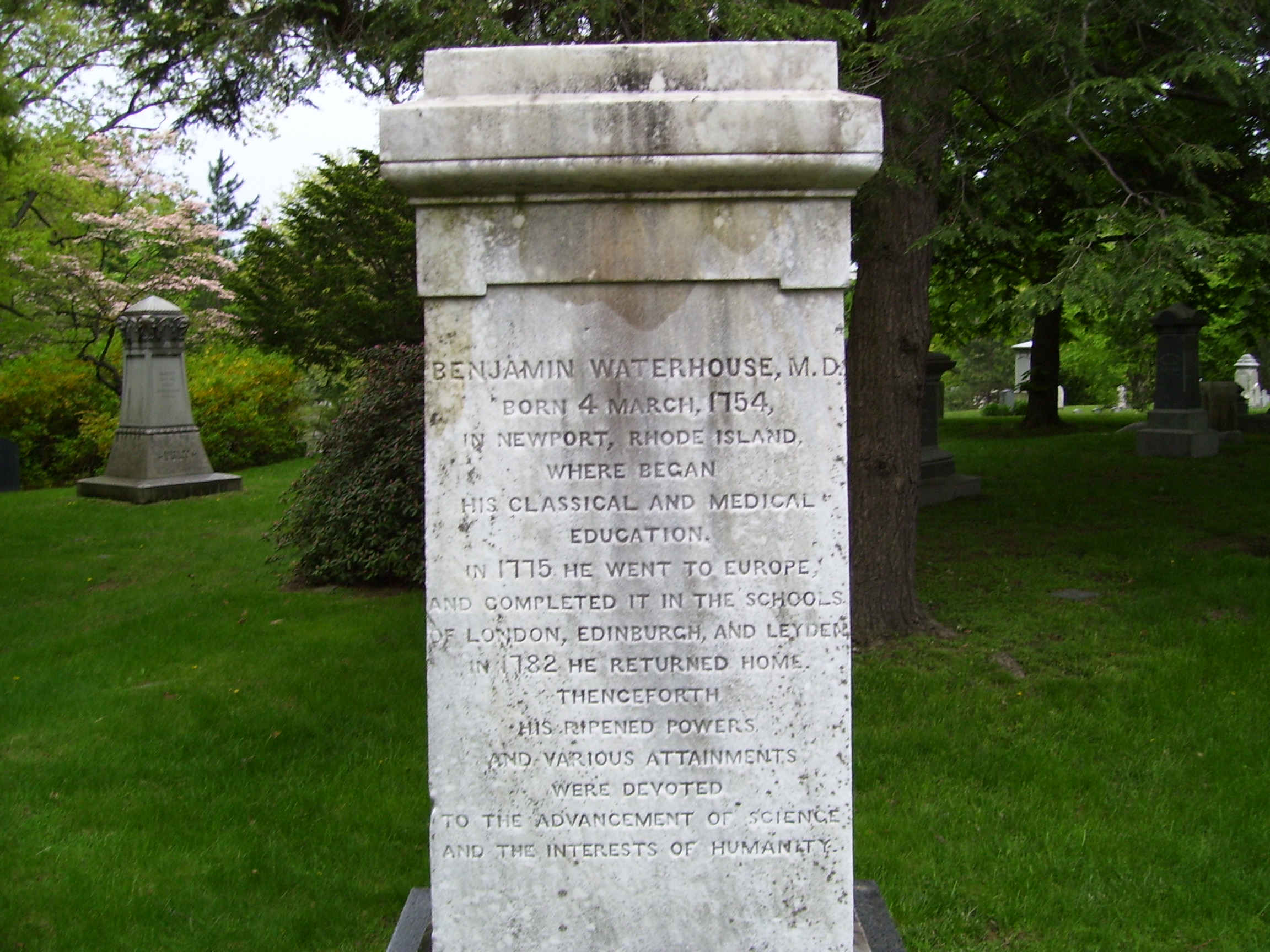
Dr. Benjamin Waterhouse's grave

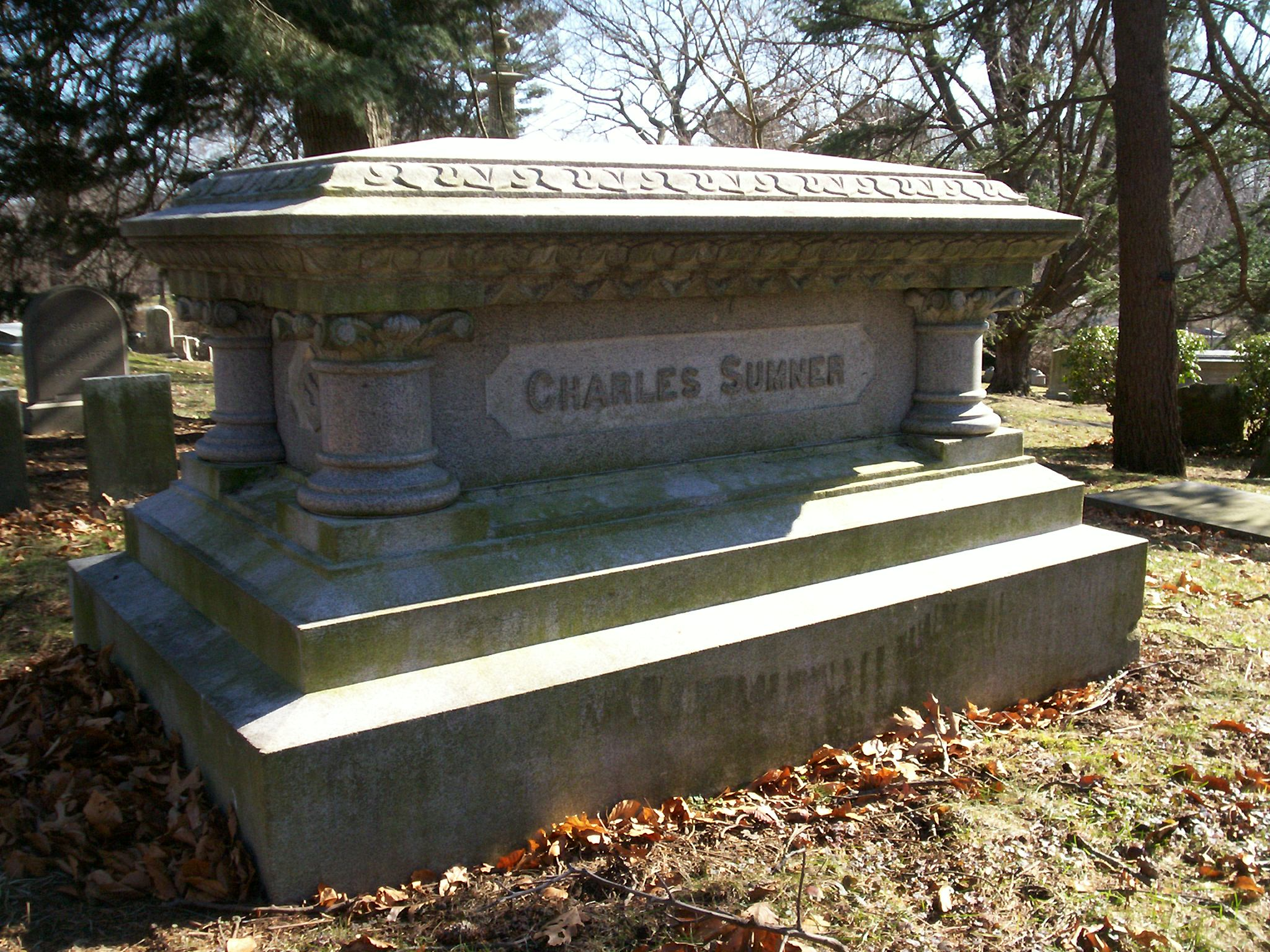
Charles Sumner's grave

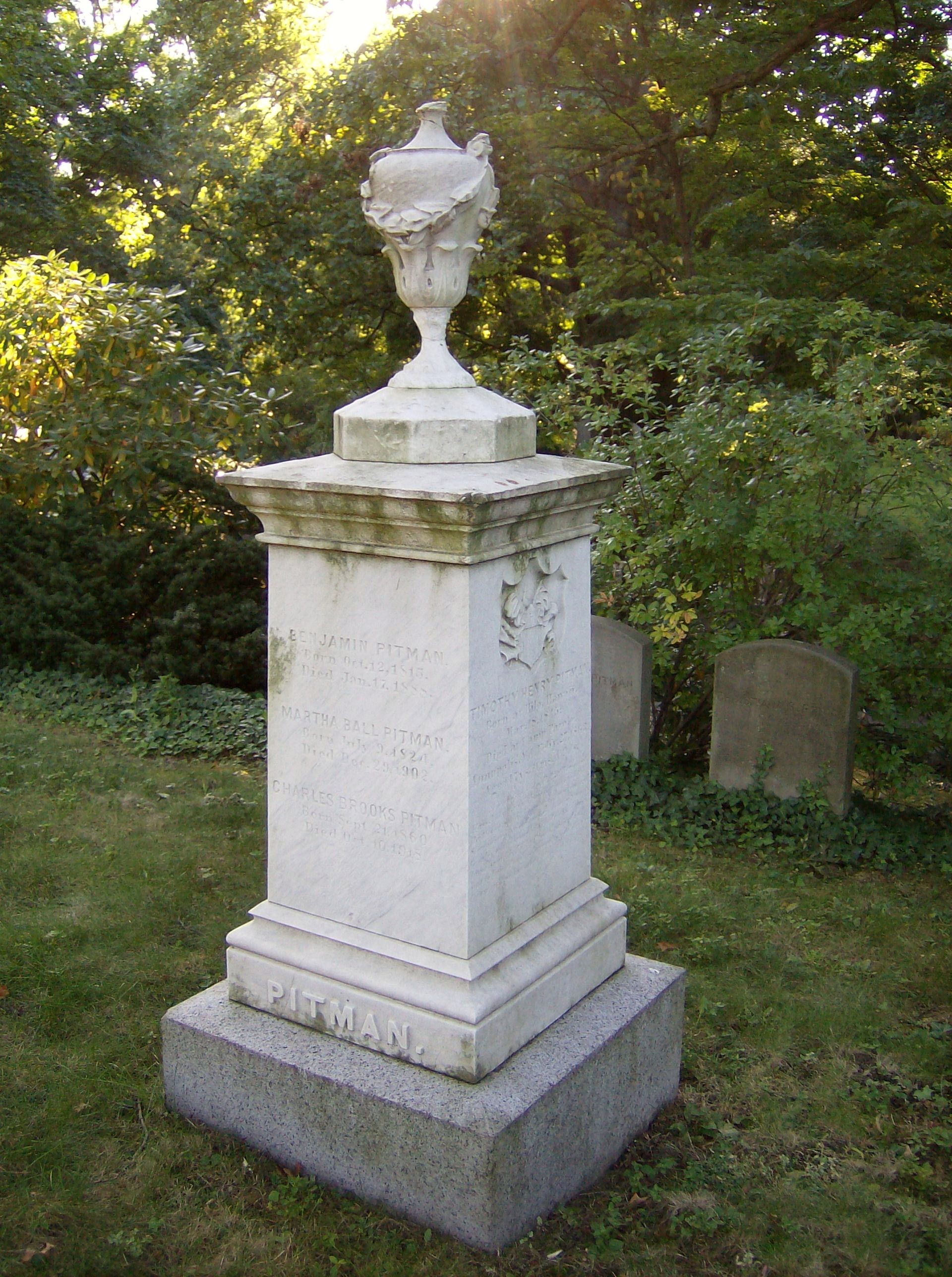
Pitman family marker

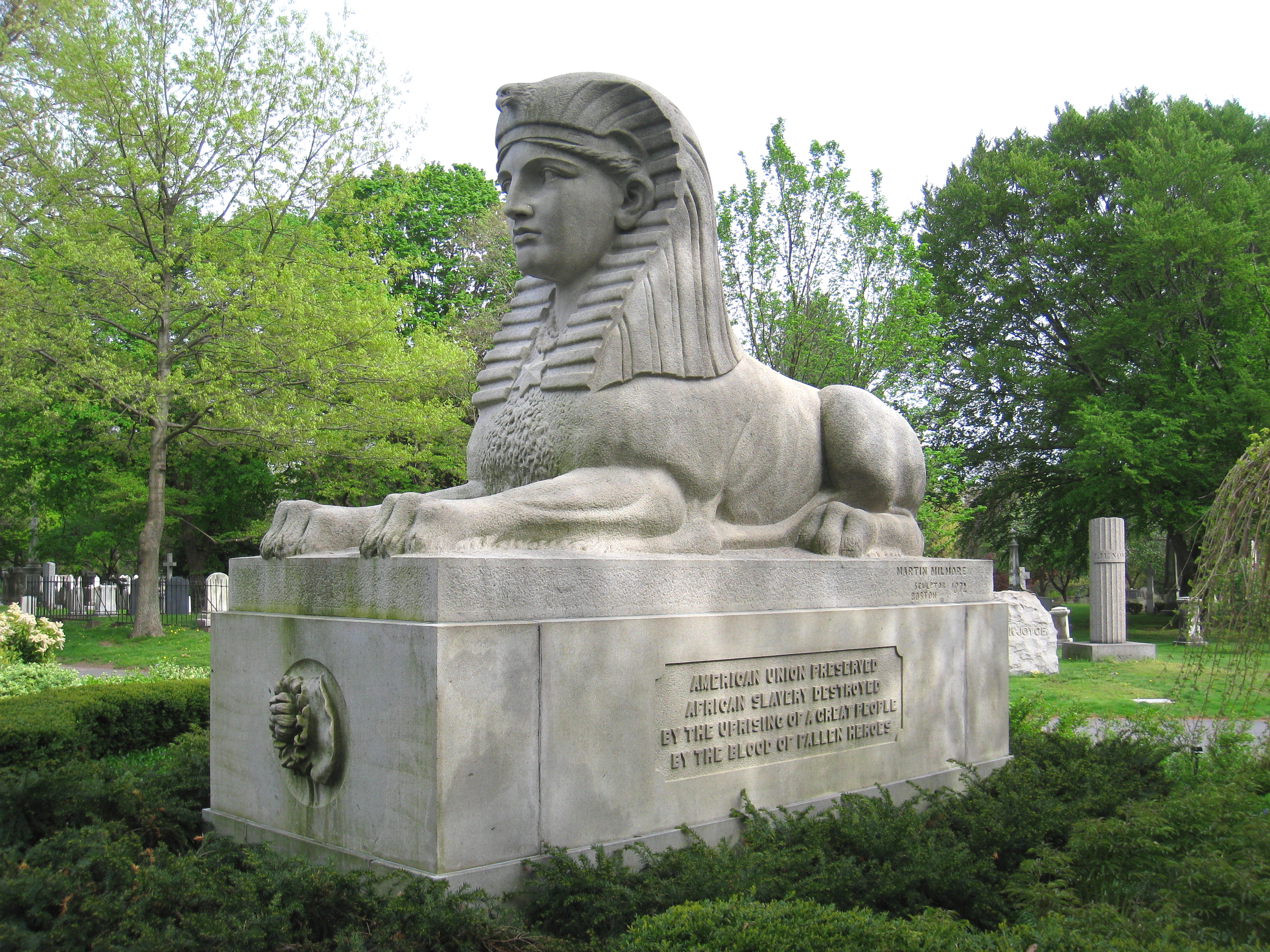
Sphinx monument by Martin Milmore, 1872

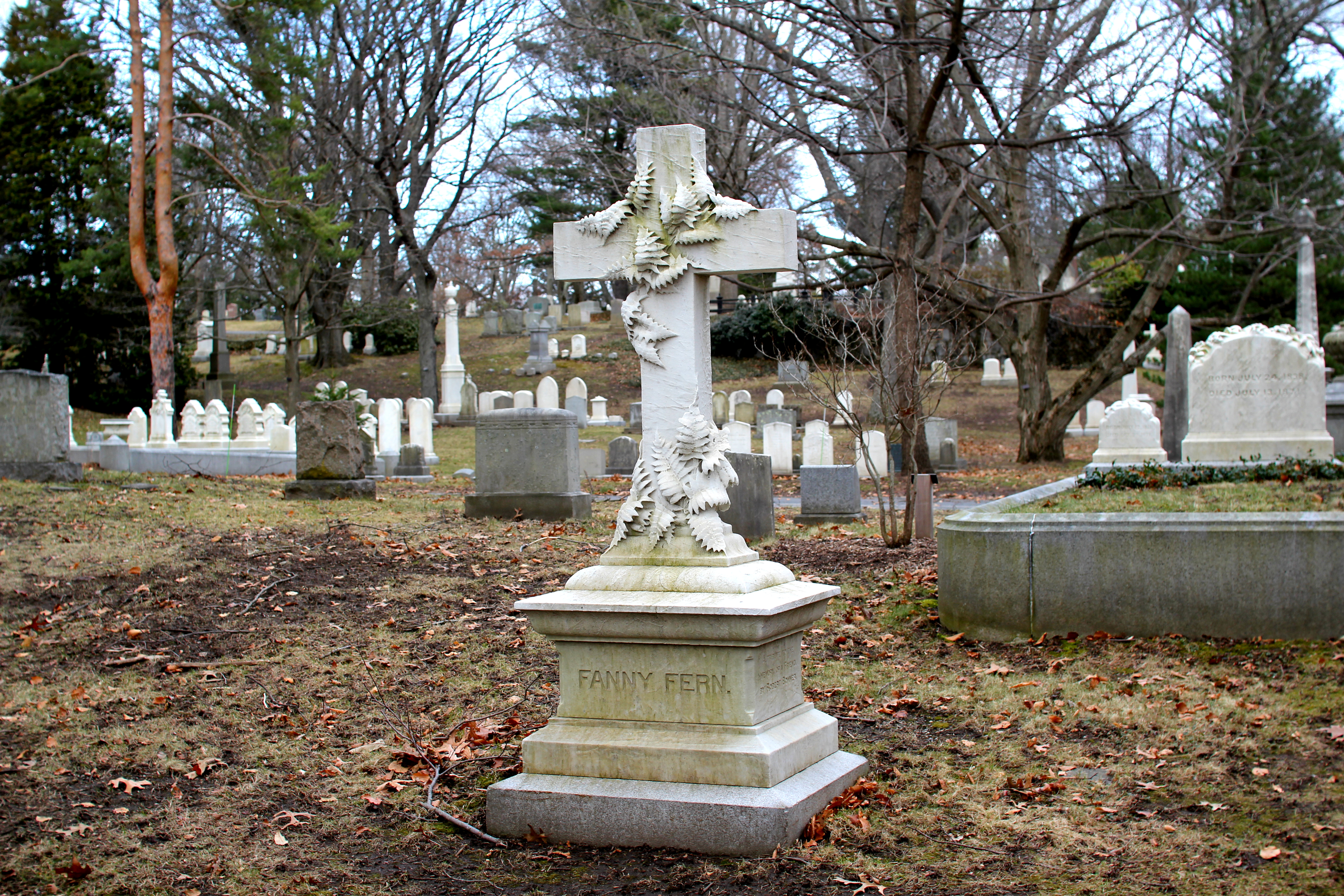
Fanny Fern's Grave

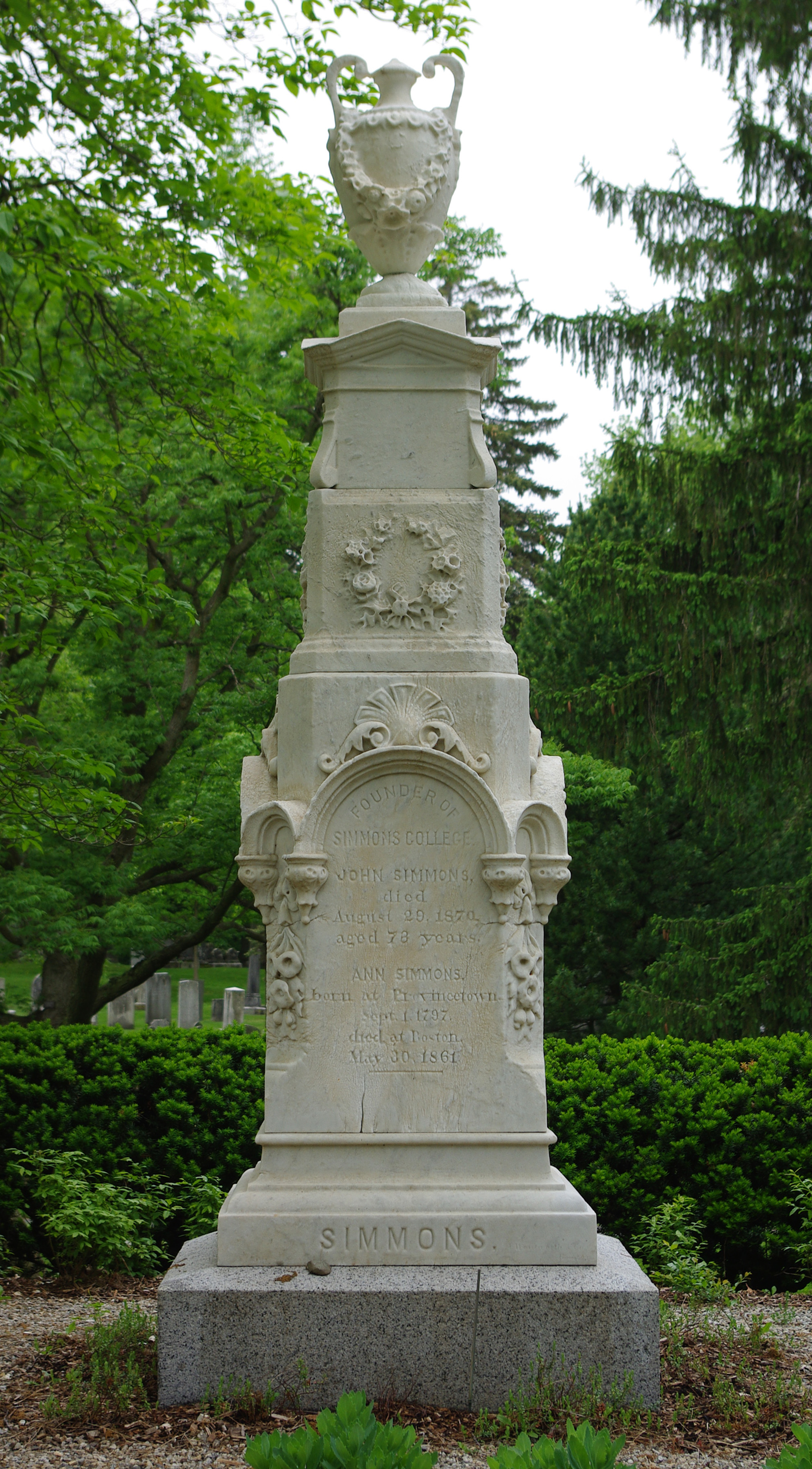
Grave of John Simmons

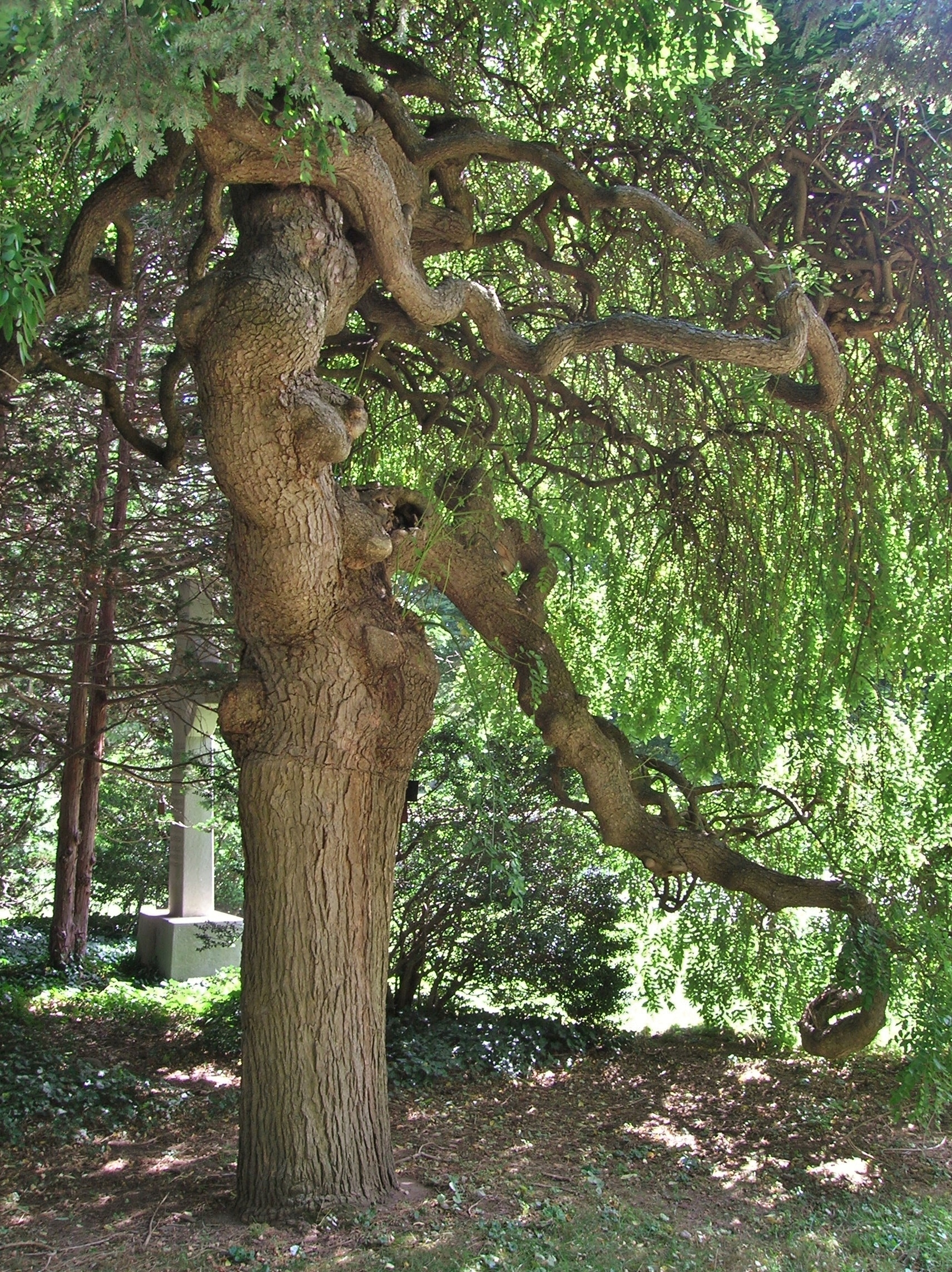
Weeping Japanese pagoda tree

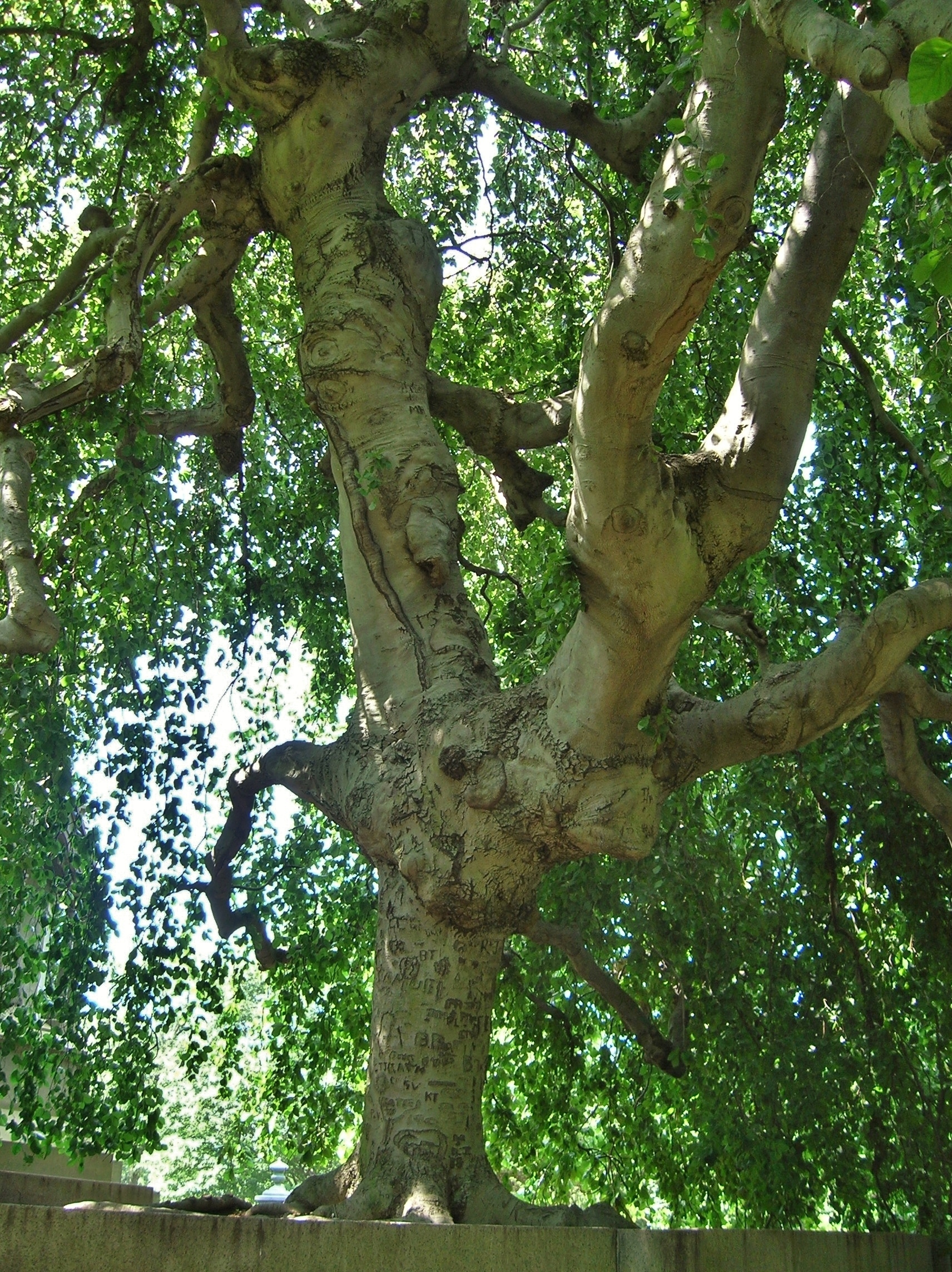
Weeping European beech tree

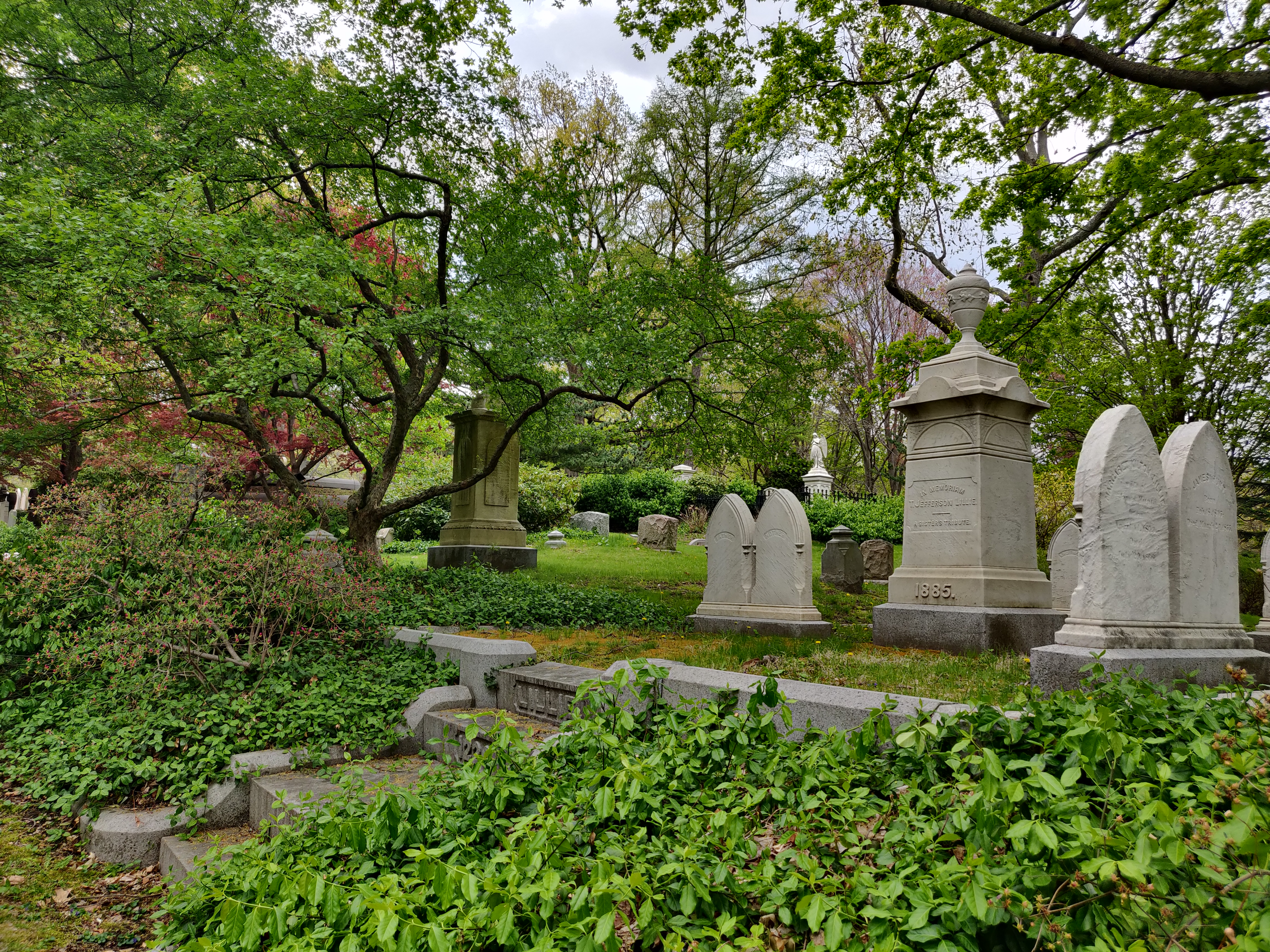
T. Jefferson Lillie tombstone

== See also ==
- List of National Historic Landmarks in Massachusetts
- List of burial places of justices of the Supreme Court of the United States
- National Register of Historic Places listings in Cambridge, Massachusetts
- Mount Pleasant Cemetery, Toronto, modelled after Mount Auburn
