= Fred S. Cozzens =

American marine artist

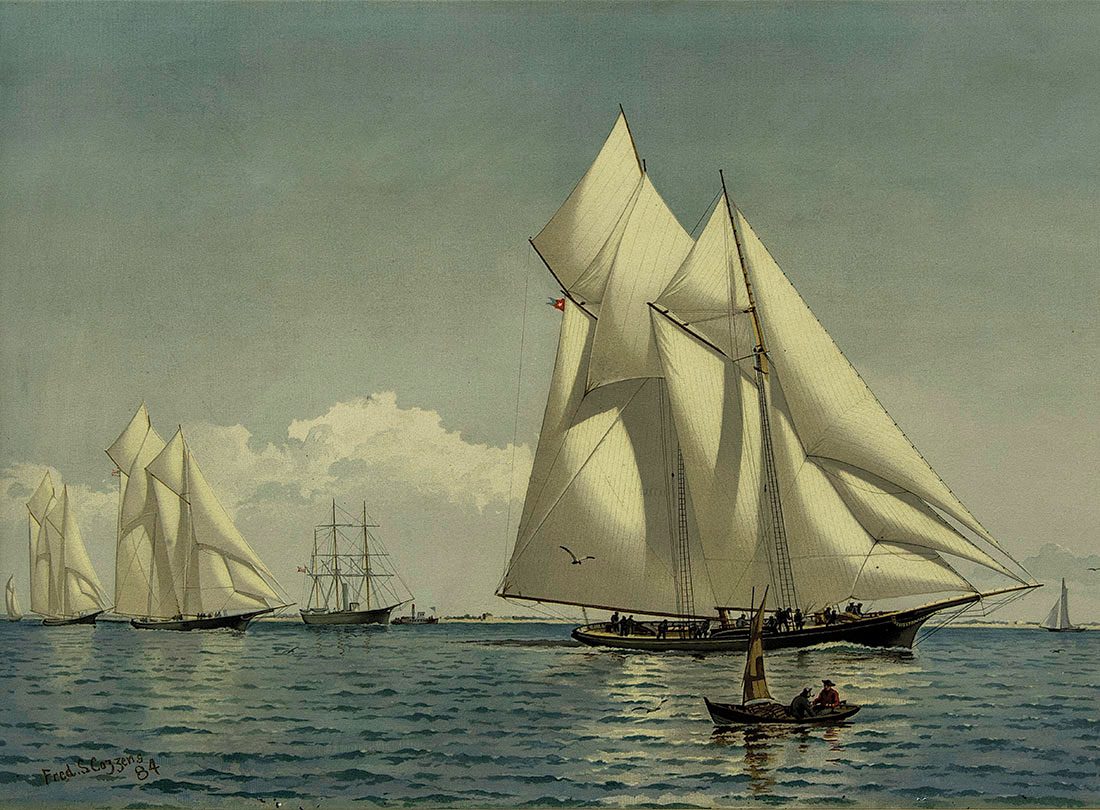
Fred S. Cozzens most notable work was of yachts

Frederick Schiller Cozzens (1846–1928) was an American marine artist.

== Early life ==
Born Fred Schiller Cozzens on 11 October 1846 in New York City, he was the son of Frederick Swartwout Cozzens (1818–1869), the humorist, who sometimes wrote under the name Richard Haywarde, and Susan (Meyers) Cozzens.

Cozzens attended the Rensselaer Polytechnic Institute from 1864 to 1867, but did not complete the degree course; he was largely self taught as an artist.

== Career ==
Apart from his marine painting, he was an illustrator for The Daily Graphic, Harpers Weekly, Our Navy magazine, and others.

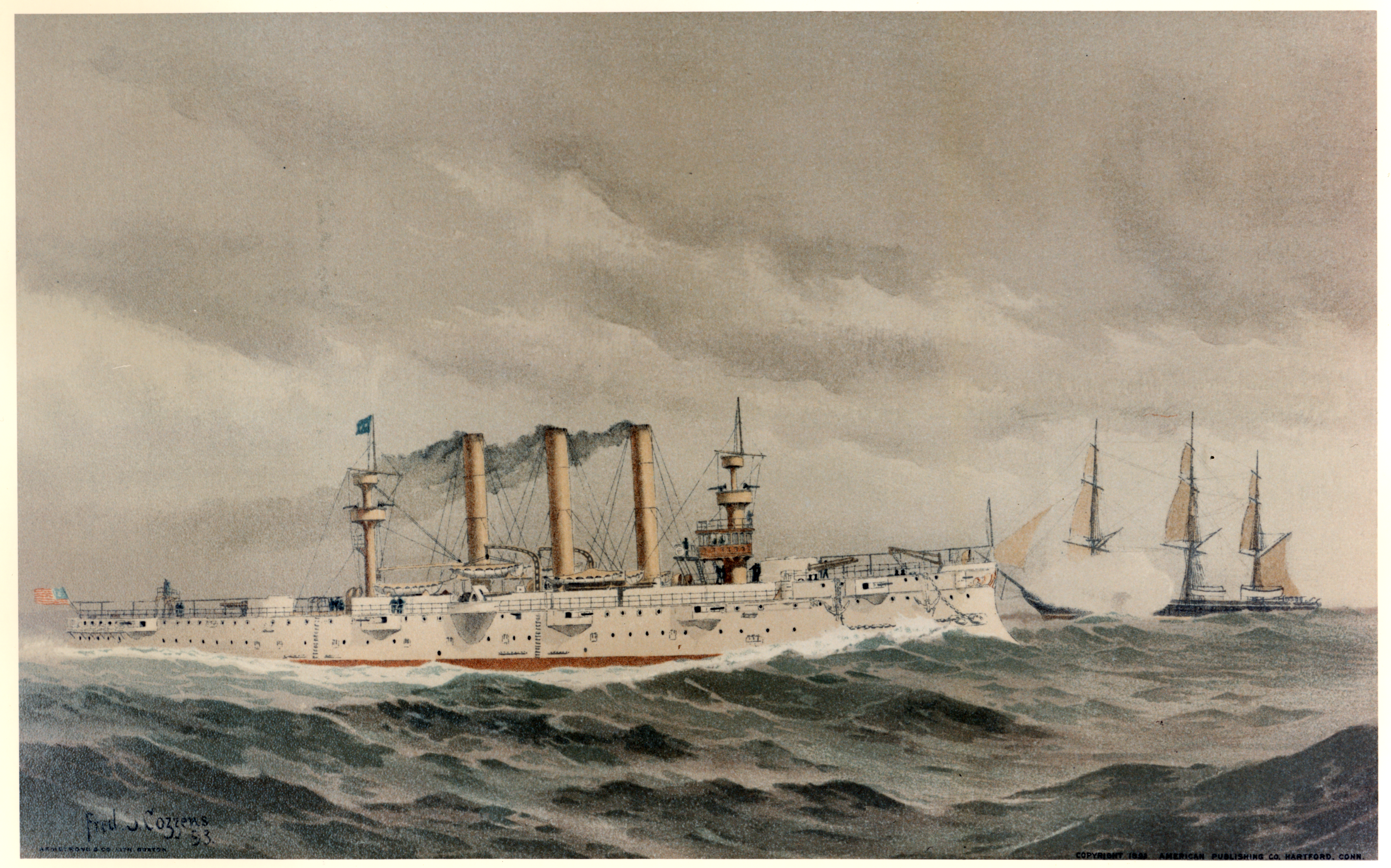
USS Brooklyn

He also illustrated books on yachting, in 1884 a series of his chromolithographs, taken from earlier watercolors were reproduced in the book American Yachts: Their Clubs and Races, by U.S. Navy Lieutenant James Douglas Jerrold Kelley (J. D. Jerrold Kelley), published by Charles Scribner's Sons in 1884. This collection comprises his best known work. This book was the first of a series of four, the most notable follow-up being, Typical American Yachts (1886).

After 1899, he worked mainly on private watercolor commissions, mostly marine subjects. He continued painting up to about 1918.

He exhibited at the Boston Art Club, the Brooklyn Art Association, and the Mystic Seaport Association.

His work has been widely published.

Examples of his work have been bought by the Museum of the City of New York, New-York Historical Society, the New York Yacht Club, the Los Angeles County Museum of Art, and the National Maritime Museum, in London.

He often signed as Fred. S. Cozzens, and Frederic S. Cozzens.

Cozzens was a long time resident of Livingston, Staten Island, where he died on 29 August 1928.
