= Willis Gaylord Clark =

American poet

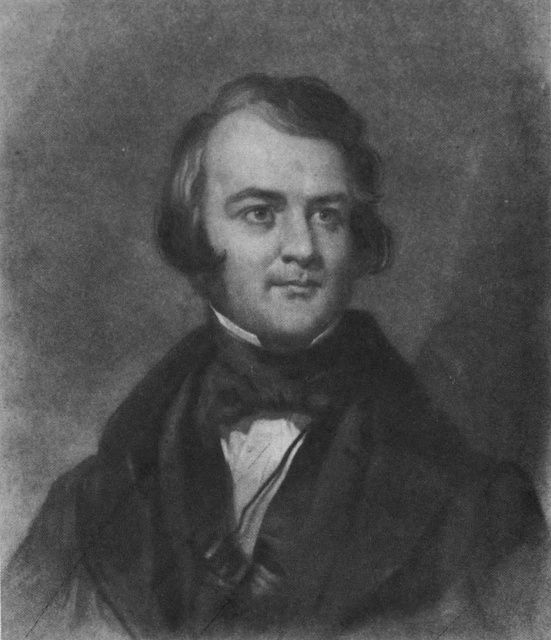
Willis Gaylord Clark.

Willis Gaylord Clark (October 5, 1808 – June 12, 1841) was an American poet.

He was born in Otisco, New York and the twin-brother of Lewis Gaylord Clark. Clark wrote a series of amusing articles called Ollapodiana for the magazine The Knickerbocker. Among his best known poems is The Spirit of Life (1833). In the latter part of his life, he was the chief editor of the Philadelphia Gazette. Clark died from tuberculosis in Philadelphia, June 12, 1841. His Literary Remains were published in 1844, and a reissue of his collected poems in 1846.

== Sources ==
- New General Catalog of Old Books and Authors
- The letters of William Cullen Bryant, Volume 2
