= Mount Auburn Cemetery Reception House (1870) =

- U.S. National Register of Historic Places
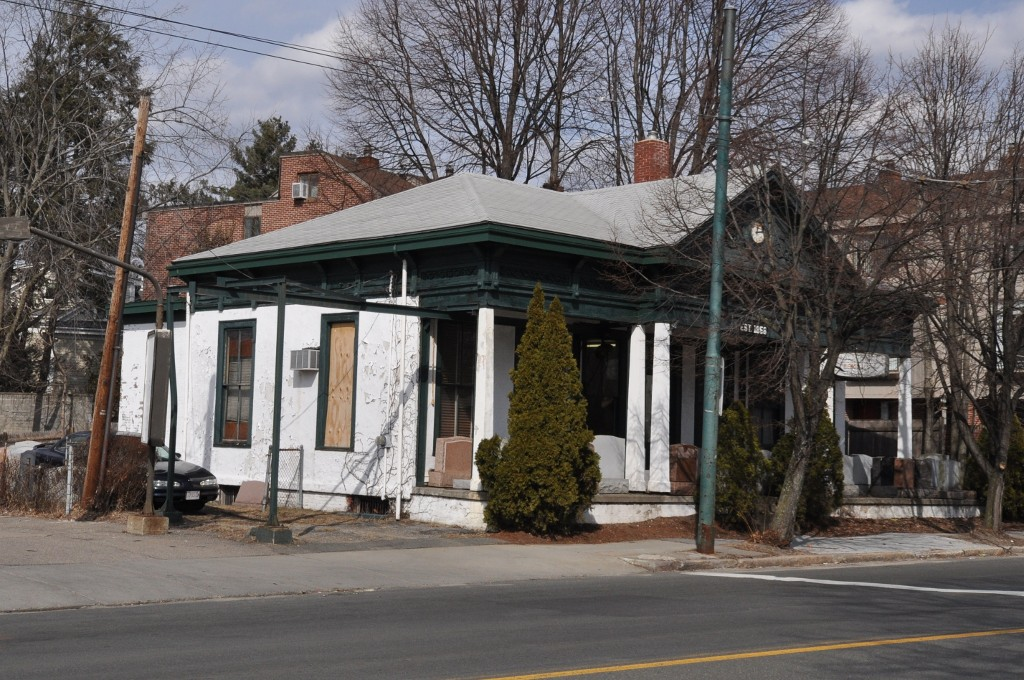

- Location within Massachusetts Location within the United States
- Location: 583 Mount Auburn Street, Cambridge, Massachusetts
- Coordinates: 42°22′32″N 71°8′45″W
- Built: 1870
- Architect: Bradlee, Nathaniel J.
- Architectural style: Italianate
- MPS: Cambridge MRA
- NRHP reference No.: 83000818
- Added to NRHP: June 30, 1983

The 1870 Mount Auburn Cemetery Reception House is an historic building that originally served as the reception house of Mount Auburn Cemetery in Cambridge, Massachusetts. The building is located at 583 Mount Auburn Street, across the street from the cemetery, and is no longer part of the cemetery. A new reception house was built on the cemetery grounds in 1896.

== Description and history ==
When Mount Auburn Cemetery was opened in 1831, it quickly developed as a popular outing destination for the local population. Its popularity was such that the first horse-drawn trolley route in New England was built with a terminus at the cemetery's entrance in 1853. Demand for function spaces related to funeral activities also increased, prompting the cemetery trustees to consider building a reception hall.

The cemetery's first reception house was built in 1870 to a design by Nathaniel J. Bradlee, and is one of only two surviving designs of his in Cambridge. The building was commissioned by the cemetery trustees as a place to hold receptions and other functions. It is a single story building 46 feet (14 m) wide and 30 feet (9.1 m) deep, with a full-width porch supported by four tapered columns, and a projecting center gable supported by two additional columns. The gable and the frieze board above the columns are decorated with incised floral patterns, while the tympanum of the gable end has a cartouche for a clock.

The building was listed on the National Register of Historic Places in 1983. It now houses a funerary monuments company.

== See also ==
- National Register of Historic Places listings in Cambridge, Massachusetts
