= Lewis Gaylord Clark =

American journalist

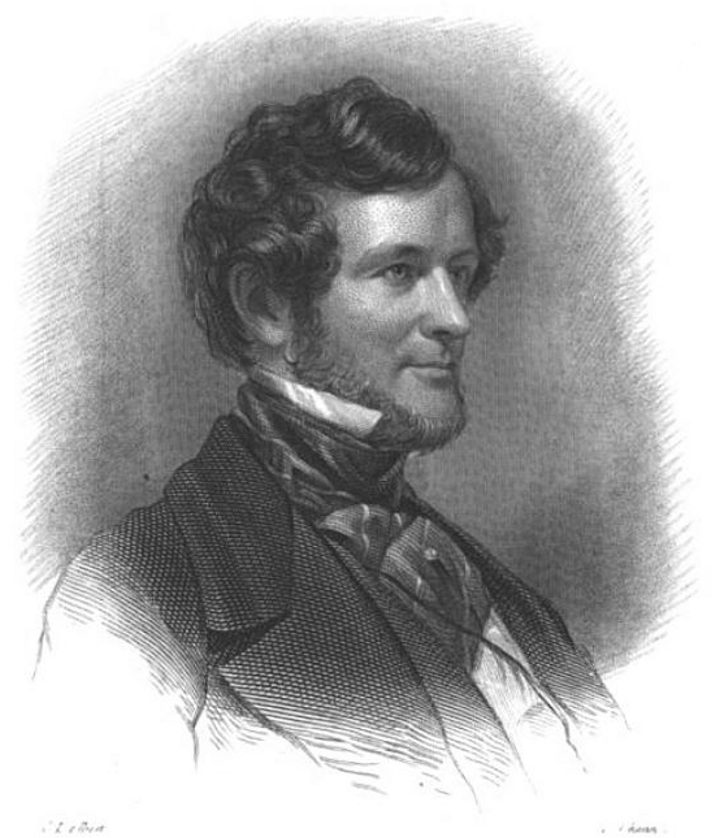
- Engraving of Lewis Gaylord Clark (1855).
- Born: 18 October 1808
- Died: 29 December 1873 (aged 65); New York City, U.S.
- Occupations: Editor, critic, author
- Notable work: The Knickerbocker

Lewis Gaylord Clark (Note: Clark usually styled his name L. Gaylord Clark. The spelling of his first name has been given both as Louis, notably in The Knickerbocker Gallery, and as Lewis.) (October 5, 1808 – November 3, 1873) was an American magazine editor, publisher, and literary critic best known for his role as editor and publisher of The Knickerbocker from 1834 to 1861. Under his leadership, The Knickerbocker became one of the most prominent literary publications in the United States during the mid-19th century, featuring contributions from leading literary figures such as Washington Irving, William Cullen Bryant, Nathaniel Parker Willis, and Henry Wadsworth Longfellow. Clark was renowned for his editorial departments, including the "Editor's Table" and "Gossip with Readers and Correspondents," which engaged a wide readership.

Born in Otisco, New York, Clark was the twin brother of the poet Willis Gaylord Clark. Following his tenure at The Knickerbocker, he founded Clark's Knickerbocker, a rival magazine which sought to distance itself from abolitionist sentiments he opposed. Despite his editorial success, Clark was known for a literary rivalry with fellow editor Edgar Allan Poe, which was marked by published critiques and personal animosity. After his magazine ceased publication, Clark continued to write for periodicals such as the Evening Post and the Home Journal until his death in New York City.

== Biography ==
Clark was born in Otisco, New York in 1808. He had a twin brother, poet Willis Gaylord Clark.

== Career ==
He succeeded Charles Fenno Hoffman as editor and publisher of The Knickerbocker magazine, a role he held for over 25 years (1834–1861). By 1840, it had become the most influential literary publication of the time in the United States, especially through the contributions from such writers as Washington Irving, William Cullen Bryant, Nathaniel Parker Willis, and Henry Wadsworth Longfellow, and by Clark's own departments, the "Editors Table" and "Gossip with Readers and Correspondents". Pecuniary distress caused its discontinuance, and Clark removed to Piermont, New York, where he lived in a residence presented by former contributors to his magazine, who raised the necessary funds in part by publishing a volume of their contributions, under the title The Knickerbocker Gallery. He published the Knickerbocker Sketch-Book (1850), including some of his own essays, and Knick-Knacks from an Editor's Table (1852). He stepped down from The Knickerbocker in late 1861 to launch in March 1862 a competing magazine, Clark's Knickerbocker, which he intended to be free of "the spirit of abolition" that had become part of The Knickerbocker. In retirement, after the magazine folded, Clark regularly contributed articles to the Evening Post and the Home Journal.

During his career, Clark made an enemy of fellow editor and author Edgar Allan Poe. The two traded insults in their respective magazines.
