= Kinahan Cornwallis (writer) =

- Born: Albert MacKenzie Russell Kinahan; 24 December 1837; London, United Kingdom of Great Britain and Ireland
- Died: 15 August 1917 aged 82; New York, New York
- Resting place: New York Marble Cemetery
- Occupations: editor, writer, and lawyer
- Spouse(s): Annie Louise Tisdale (m. 1867, d. 1869); Elizabeth Chapman (m. 1879)
- Children: Kinahan Cornwallis
- Writing career
- Language: English

Kinahan Cornwallis (né Albert McKenzie Russell Kinahan; 1837–1917) was a British / American poet, writer, editor, and lawyer.

== Biography ==
=== Early life ===
From his marriage certificates, it appears that Cornwallis's father was William Baxter Kinahan and his mother Elizabeth, but his early life is not well-documented. Biographers have unquestioningly accepted Cornwallis's writings as factual when they are questionable at best. A volume titled My Life and Adventuires; An Autobiography is a work of fiction. He appears to have been born in London, United Kingdom of Great Britain and Ireland, and attended school in Liverpool. He states that he had studied for the ministry and medicine before leaving England for Australia. On his arrival in Melbourne, Australia in 1853 (when his age is stated as 32) he sought employment as a clerk in a mercantile house and by July had been named as a customs clerk in the colonial government. He later claimed continued employment in the British Colonial Civil Service but this is doubtful. Cornwallis spent two years in Australia and claimed to have visited the Philippines, Singapore, Ceylon, Egypt, Japan, Africa, South America, Canada, and the United States over the next five years but these claims are suspect. Books in 1858 and 1859 on travels to British Columbia and Japan have been shown to have been largely plagiarized and there is doubt that he visited either country. He was back in England in 1856.

=== Writing career ===
His first published work was Yarra Yarra or Tales of a Traveller, a lengthy poetry work which appeared in England under his true name in 1856 and which received largely negative reviews both in England and in Australia. Later editions of this volume and all his subsequent writings bore the name Kinahan Cornwallis which he used for the remainder of his life. Between 1857 and 1862 he produced four novels, several of which appeared in multi volumes. These included Howard Plunkett, or Adrift in Life, The Crossticks; or, A Medley in the Gittens Family, Wreck and Ruin: or, Modern Society and Pilgrims of Fashion : A Novel.

During the same period he also wrote a series of travel accounts detailing visits to Australia, South America, Japan and other countries. These received kinder reviews but some critics voiced suspicion that the accounts of his activities were embellished with material from other writers or were simply made up.

In 1860 Cornwallis worked as a correspondent for the New York Herald covering the visit of the Prince of Wales to North America for the newspaper. The accounts were gathered and released as Royalty in the New World; or The Prince of Wales in America. This work features full descriptions of the principal cities and towns, and chief natural features of British North America and the United States, together with accurate geographical and statistical information respecting the country generally, and a traveller's reflections upon the manners and customs of the people. On 16 November, the New York Herald included the following: "We are glad that Mr. Cornwallis, who accompanied the royal party throughout their tour, is about to supply a popular want, by the publication of a complete narrative of the royal progress. We feel assured that no one is more capable, both from literary talent and personal observation, of doing entire justice to the subject as a matter of history, and of producing a lively, agreeable, and entertaining book withal, than the gentleman to whom we refer. And there is no doubt the work will prove a pleasant souvenir of the New World travels of the eldest son of Queen Victoria, and have a large circulation not only in this country but on the other side of the Atlantic, where it is announced to appear simultaneously with the American edition."

Cornwallis continued to work for the Herald for about nine years. At the same time he was noted as editor of the Knickerbocker Monthly and after leaving the Herald, he became owner of the Knickerbocker Magazine and the Albion. In 1886, he assumed control of the Wall Street Daily Investigator, later the Wall Street Daily Investor. In 1862 Cornwallis had been admitted to the New York bar and from then until his death he practiced law in addition to his editorial activities. He was the author of legal treatises on contempt of court and international law.

In the 1890s he returned to the writing of poetry and novels but without distinction. At the time of his death he was regarded as a prominent lawyer, with little mention being made of his literary output.

== Personal life ==
Kinahan Cornwallis was father to Kinahan Cornwallis, the diplomat.
