= Kinahan Cornwallis =

British ambassador

Sir Kinahan Cornwallis GCMG CBE DSO
- 1933 photograph of Cornwallis by Walter Stoneman
- Born: 19 February 1883
- Died: 3 June 1959 (aged 76); North Warnborough, Basingstoke
- Education: University College, Oxford

Sir Kinahan Cornwallis GCMG CBE DSO (19 February 1883 – 3 June 1959) was a British administrator and diplomat best known for being an advisor to King Faisal I of Iraq and for being the British Ambassador to the Kingdom of Iraq during the Anglo-Iraqi War.

== Early life and education ==
Kinahan Cornwallis was born on 19 February 1883 in the United States and was the son of British poet, writer, and world traveler Kinahan Cornwallis and his wife Elisabeth Cornwallis (née Chapman) of Hartford, Connecticut. Cornwallis was educated at Haileybury and University College, Oxford, from 1904 to 1906 he was president of the Oxford University Athletic Club. He left university and spent eight years in the Sudan Civil Service.

== Career ==
=== Director of the Arab Bureau ===
From 1916 to 1920, Cornwallis was the Director of the Arab Bureau. He had been deputy director of the bureau under David Hogarth, a Naval Intelligence officer.

The Arab Bureau was created by the British as a section of the Cairo Intelligence Department during the World War I. The bureau was created on the initiative of Mark Sykes. Its purpose was to improve British decision making with regard to Arab affairs more unified and effective. Other members of the Arab Bureau included George Stewart Symes, Philip Graves, Gertrude Bell, Aubrey Herbert and T. E. Lawrence.

=== Advisor ===
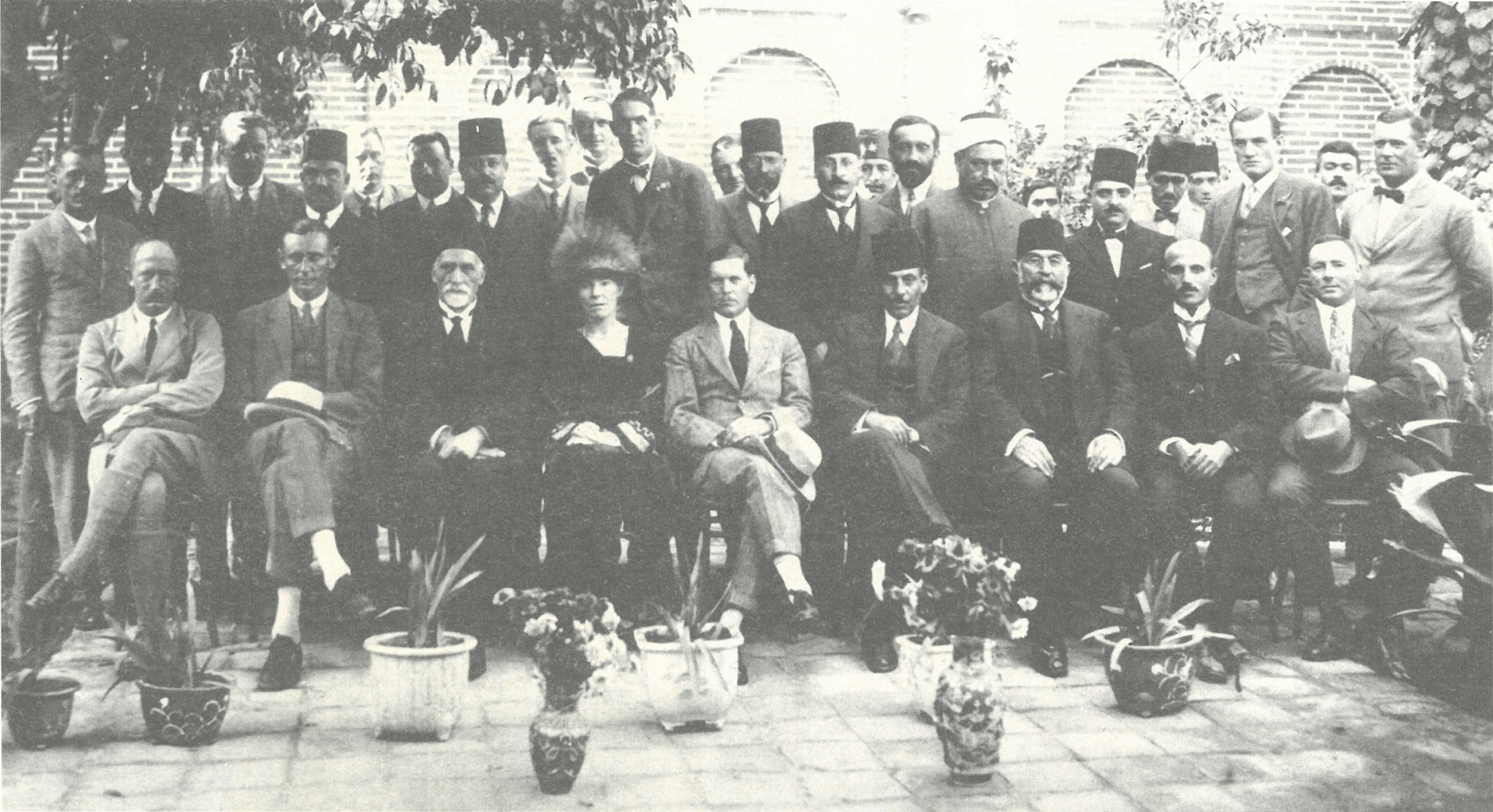
A photograph of British and Iraqi dignitaries in Baghdad from 1923 during the era of Mandatory Iraq. From second left to right in the front row, Kinahan Cornwallis, Sassoon Eskell, and Gertrude Bell. Bernard Henry Bourdillon stands directly behind Bell in the second row.

As the British advisor to the Iraqi Ministry of Interior, Cornwallis played a part in the ratification of the Anglo-Iraqi Treaty of 1922. The treaty was signed by the members of the Iraqi cabinet in October 1922 and required ratification by an Iraqi 100-member constituent assembly.

On 11 September 1923, Cornwallis asked the British administrative inspectors in all Iraqi provinces (liwa) to telegraph him the names of candidates who they and the Iraqi provincial governors felt would vote for the treaty.

On 8 February 1924, after considering the names, Cornwallis sent each provincial inspector and governor a list of proposed candidates for the 100-member constituent assembly. The treaty was ratified by the assembly on 24 March 1924. A quorum of only 69 out of 100 delegates participated in the meeting. Of the 69, only 37 voted for the treaty; and even these votes came only after the British High Commissioner Sir Percy Cox threatened to dissolve the assembly and issue orders to occupy the assembly building and its surroundings.

In 1940, Cornwallis wrote the Introduction to Gertrude Bell's posthumously published The Arab War. Bell died in 1926. The book was censored by a mark indicating confidential information for General Headquarters from Bell bring composed of dispatches from the secretive Arab Bulletin. According to his signature, Cornwallis wrote the Introduction while in Petersfield.

=== Ambassador to Iraq ===
On 1 April 1941, pro-German Rashid Ali and a group of supporters staged a coup d'état to depose the government of the pro-British Regent of the Kingdom of Iraq, Prince Abdul Illah. From 2 April, Cornwallis was named as the British ambassador to Iraq. He had much experience in Mesopotamia having spent twenty years in the country as adviser to former King Faisal I who had died in 1933. Cornwallis, being highly regarded, was sent to Iraq on the understanding that he would be able to hold a more forceful line with the new Iraqi government than had hitherto been the case. Unfortunately the British agent Cornwallis arrived in Iraq too late to prevent the outbreak of war.

On 18 April, as part of Operation Sabine, the 20th Indian Infantry Brigade was landed at Basra without opposition. The brigade included personnel of the Royal Artillery's 3rd Field Regiment; but without their guns, and the headquarters of the 10th Indian Infantry Division landed at Basra; covered by infantry of the King's Own Royal Regiment. Major-General William Fraser, commanding officer of the 10th Indian Infantry Division, assumed control over the land forces based within Iraq, initially known as Sabine Force and ultimately known as Iraqforce. Brigadier Donald Powell commanded the 20th Indian Infantry Brigade. The following day seven aircraft (Note: Six Gloster Gladiators fighters and one Vickers Wellington bomber, carrying spare parts.) were flown into RAF Habbaniya to bolster the air force there.

Following the landing of the troops on 18 April, Rashid Ali requested that they be moved quickly through the country and that no more should arrive until the previous force had left. Cornwallis referred the issue to London and received the reply that there was no interest in moving the troops out of the country. London wanted to establish the troops within Iraq. Cornwallis was also informed not to inform Rashid Ali who, as he had taken control of the country via a coup d'état, had no right to be informed about British troop movements.

On 29 April, a further three ships landed at Basra and brought ancillary troops. On the same day Ambassador Cornwallis advised that all British women and children should leave Baghdad; 230 civilians were escorted by road to Habbaniya and during the following days were gradually air lifted to RAF Shaibah. A further 350 civilians took refuge in the British Embassy and 150 British civilians in the American Legation.

On 30 April, when Ali was informed that ships containing even more British forces had arrived, he refused permission for these troops to disembark. Rashid Ali also began organizing for an armed demonstration at RAF Habbaniya while anticipating German assistance would be forthcoming in the guise of aircraft and airborne troops. Later that day, Iraqi ground forces with artillery took up strong positions on the escarpment above RAF Habbaniya.

Cornwallis signaled the Foreign Office that he regarded the Iraqi actions as an act of war which required an immediate air response. He also informed them that he intended to demand the withdrawal of the Iraqi forces and permission to launch air strikes to restore control. Even if the Iraqi troops overlooking Habbaniya did withdraw it would only postpone aerial attacks. On 1 May, the Cornwallis received a response giving him full authority to take any steps needed to ensure the withdrawal of the Iraqi armed forces. British Prime Minister Winston Churchill also sent a personal reply, stating: "If you have to strike, strike hard. Use all necessary force".

Were contact to break down between the Embassy in Baghdad and the besieged force at Habbaniya, the Air Officer Commanding, Air Vice-Marshal H. G. Smart, was given permission to act on his own authority. On 2 May, after several days of warnings and counter-warnings, Smart launched pre-emptive air strikes on the Iraqi forces positioned on the escarpment. AVM Smart also launched air attacks on Iraqi forces throughout the country. From this point, Cornwallis was confined to the British Embassy compound in Baghdad.

The British air strikes were extremely successful and, by the evening of 6 May, the Iraqis abandoned the escarpment above Habbaniya. After the arrival of elements of Habforce, the British ground forces from Habbaniya pressed on to Fallujah and, after its fall, they advanced towards Baghdad. On 29 May, the government of Rashid Ali collapsed and he and his supporters fled to Persia.

On the morning of 31 May, the Mayor of Baghdad and a delegation approached British forces at the Washash Bridge outside of Baghdad. With the Mayor was Sir Kinahan Cornwallis. Terms were quickly reached, an armistice was signed, and the monarchy and a pro-British government were put back in place. On 1 June, the Regent returned to Baghdad. On 1 June an armed Iraqi mob began a two-day murder spree against Baghdad's Jews, known as "The Farhud". After two days the Mayor of Baghdad and police loyal to the Iraqi monarchy quelled the violence by imposing a curfew and shot violators on sight. An investigation conducted by the journalist Tony Rocca of the London Sunday Times criticized Cornwallis's conduct, when he refused to act against the riots even though he was urged to do so by British army and government officials.

== Family life ==
On 14 October 1911 in London, Cornwallis married Gertrude Dorothy Bowen, daughter of Sir Albert Edward Bowen, 1st Baronet, and Alice Anita Crowther. They had a daughter Elisabeth Cornwallis (1912–1999), and two sons; Richard Kinahan Cornwallis and Peter Brownell Cornwallis (who was killed in action along with his Australian flight crew while flying over the North Sea on a supplies mission to Norway in February 1945). Kinahan and Gertrude Cornwallis divorced in 1925. Cornwallis married again in 1937 to Margaret Hilda Mary Clark. He died 3 June 1959 at his home at North Warnborough, Basingstoke, aged 76.

== See also ==
- Arab Revolt
- the region of Syria
- Arab Bureau
- Sykes-Picot Agreement of 1916
- League of Nations
- British Mandate of Mesopotamia
- British Mandate of Palestine
- Anglo-Iraqi Treaty of 1922
- Anglo-Iraqi Treaty of 1930
- Kingdom of Iraq
- British-Iraqi relations
- 1941 Iraqi coup d'état
- Farhud
- T. E. Lawrence – Following Lawrence and archaeologist D. G. Hogarth, Corwallis edited the Arab Bulletin (1916–1920).
- Gertrude Bell – Corwallis wrote introduction to The Arab War. Confidential Information for General Headquarters from Gertrude Bell. Being Despatches reprinted from the secret "Arab Bulletin."
- Rashid Ali Al-Gaylani – Corwallis was British ambassador to Iraq during his uprising.
- Mulla Effendi – Corwallis attended the funeral for this respected Arab leader.
- Claudius James Rich

== Notes ==
Footnotes

== Bibliography ==
- Bell, Gertrude (1940). The Arab War. London: The Golden Cockerel Press. p. 50.
- Bengio, Ofra. Michael Eisenstadt; Eric Mathewson (eds.). U.S. Policy in Post-Saddam Iraq: Lessons from the British Experience (PDF). Washington Institute for Near East Policy – via The Moshe Dayan Center for Middle Eastern and African Studies.
- Churchill, Winston (1985) [1950]. "Chapter 14: The Revolt in Iraq". The Second World War, Volume III, The Grand Alliance. Boston: Houghton Mifflin Company. ISBN 0-395-41057-6.
- Jackson, Ashley (2006). The British Empire and the Second World War. Hambledon Continuum. ISBN 1-85285-417-0.
- Lyman, Robert (2006). Iraq 1941: The Battles for Basra, Habbaniya, Fallujah and Baghdad. Campaign. Oxford, New York: Osprey Publishing. p. 96. ISBN 1-84176-991-6.
- Mackenzie, Compton. Eastern Epic: Volume 1 September 1939-March 1943 Defence. London: Chatto & Windus. OCLC 59637091.
- Martin, Colonel Thomas Alexander (1952). The Essex Regiment, 1929–1950. Essex Regiment Association.
- O'Sullivan, Christopher D. FDR and the End of Empire: The Origins of American Power in the Middle East. (Palgrave Macmillan, 2012)
- Playfair, Major-General I.S.O.; with Stitt, Commander G.M.S.; Molony, Brigadier C.J.C. & Toomer, Air Vice-Marshal S.E. (2004) [1st. pub. HMSO 1954]. Butler, J.R.M (ed.). The Mediterranean and Middle East, Volume I The Early Successes Against Italy (to May 1941). History of the Second World War, United Kingdom Military Series. Naval & Military Press. ISBN 1-84574-065-3.
- Playfair, Major-General I.S.O.; with Flynn R.N., Captain F.C.; Molony, Brigadier C.J.C. & Toomer, Air Vice-Marshal S.E. (2004) [1st. pub. HMSO 1956]. Butler, J.R.M (ed.). The Mediterranean and Middle East, Volume II The Germans come to the help of their Ally (1941). History of the Second World War, United Kingdom Military Series. Naval & Military Press. ISBN 1-84574-066-1.
- Wavell, Archibald (1946). Despatch on Operations in the Middle East From 7th February, 1941 to 15th July 1941. London: War Office. in "No. 37638". The London Gazette (Supplement). 3 July 1946. pp. 3423–3444.
- Wavell, Archibald (1946). Despatch on Operations in Iraq, East Syria and Iran from 10th April, 1941 to 12th January, 1942. London: War Office. in "No. 37685". The London Gazette (Supplement). 13 August 1946. pp. 4093–4102.
