= Frederick Swartwout Cozzens =

American writer

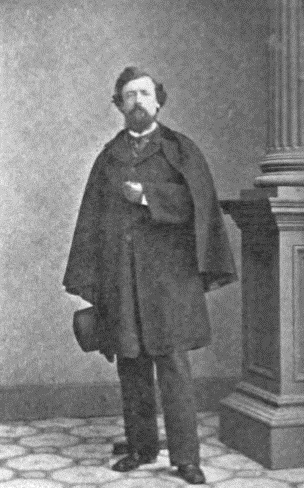
Frederick Swartwout Cozzens

Frederick Swartwout Cozzens (March 5, 1818 – December 23, 1869) was an American humorist, who sometimes wrote under the name Richard Haywarde.

== Biography ==
Cozzens was born in New York City on 5 March 1818. In early life, he became a wine merchant. Beginning in 1854, he was the proprietor and editor of Cozzens' Wine Press, a magazine on the culture of wine. In its issues, which he ran until 1861, he particularly promoted American wines.

Cozzens had previously contributed humorous poems and articles to magazines, and in 1853 he issued his first volume, Prismatics, under the pen name "Richard Haywarde". Then came The Sparrowgrass Papers, first published in The Knickerbocker, and collected in book form in 1856. The book, which was immediately popular and also published under the name Haywarde, followed a family that moved from New York City to the countryside in Yonkers. Three years later (1859) he published a volume of travel sketches, Acadia; or a Sojourn among the Blue Noses. The book reported on the difficulties of blacks who settled in Nova Scotia along the shores of the Atlantic Ocean.

Soon after the American Civil War he failed in a business for which he had labored earnestly, especially by promoting the sale of native wines, and retired from Yonkers to Rahway, New Jersey. His other works include Poems (1867) and a Memorial of Fitz-Greene Halleck (1868). He was married with Susan (Meyers) Cozzens and was the father of the marine artist Fred S. Cozzens (1846-1928).

== Death ==
Died 23 December 1869 in Brooklyn, New York.

== Selected list of works ==
- Prismatics (1853)
- The Sparrowgrass Papers (1856)
- Acadia; or a Sojourn among the Blue Noses (1859)
- Poems (1867)
- Memorial of Fitz-Greene Halleck (1868)
