= Mildred Cozzens Turner =

American composer

Mildred Josephine Cozzens Ewald Turner (February 23, 1897 – June 9, 1992) was an American composer, pianist, and singer who published her music under the name Mildred Cozzens Turner.

== Biography ==
Turner was born in Pueblo, Colorado, to Harmon and J. Wehrhane Cozzens. She married Louis Ewald in 1917, then married Huntington McDonald Turner in 1934.

Turner graduated from the University of Wisconsin–Madison School of Music and also studied in Geneva, Switzerland. Her teachers included Emil Leibling, William Benton Overstreet and Corneille and Francis Schwinger.

Turner sang with the Minneapolis Symphony Orchestra, conducted a boys' orchestra and worked as a public school supervisor in Mineral Point, Wisconsin, before moving to New York, where she was living when she married Huntington McDonald Turner in 1934. Her extensive overseas travels inspired many of her songs.

Turner was a member of the American Society of Composers, Authors and Publishers (ASCAP). Her LP recordings included CAPIT T 1152 and DECCA 9 31057. In addition to songs she wrote for amateur theater, her vocal compositions included:

- "Answer"
- "Dalmatian Lullaby"
- "Galaxy"
- "Geisha"
- "Hawaii Calls at Twilight"
- "I'm the Spell of the Moon"
- "I Wish They Didn't Mean Goodbye"
- "My Charro"
