= Gertrude Bell =

English traveller and writer

Gertrude Bell CBE
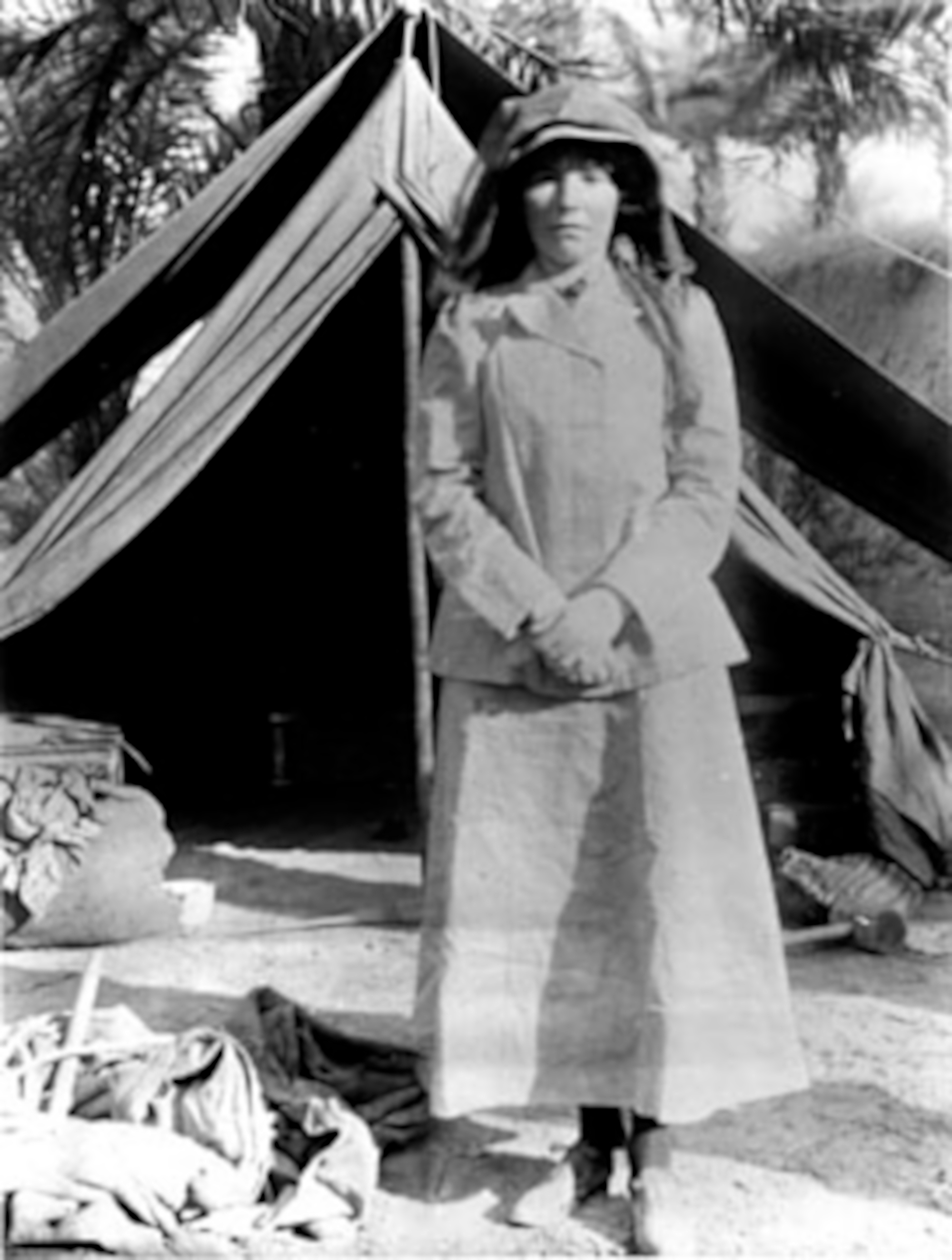
- Bell in 1909, visiting archaeological excavations in Babylon
- Born: Gertrude Margaret Lowthian Bell; 14 July 1868; Washington New Hall, County Durham, England
- Died: 12 July 1926 (aged 57); Baghdad, Mandatory Iraq
- Education: Lady Margaret Hall, Oxford
- Occupations: Traveller, political officer
- Known for: Writer, traveller, political officer, administrator and archaeologist
- Parents: Sir Hugh Bell; Mary Bell (née Shield)

Gertrude Margaret Lowthian Bell (14 July 1868 – 12 July 1926) was an English writer, traveller, political officer, administrator, and archaeologist. She spent much of her life exploring and mapping the Middle East, and became influential in British imperial policy-making as an Arabist due to her knowledge of the region and the contacts built up during her extensive travels there. She was highly esteemed and trusted by British officials, giving her great influence. She participated in both the 1919 Paris Peace Conference (briefly) and the 1921 Cairo Conference, which helped decide the territorial boundaries and governments of the post-War Middle East as part of the partition of the Ottoman Empire. Bell believed that the momentum of Arab nationalism was unstoppable, and that the British government should ally with nationalists rather than stand against them. Along with T. E. Lawrence, she advocated for independent Arab states in the Middle East following the collapse of the Ottoman Empire, and supported the installation of Hashemite monarchies in what are today Jordan and Iraq.

Bell was raised in a privileged environment that allowed her an education at Oxford University, to travel the world, and to meet future influential policy-makers. In her travels, she became an accomplished mountain climber and equestrian. She expressed great affection for the Middle East, visiting Qajar Iran, Syria-Palestine, Mesopotamia, Asia Minor, and Arabia. She participated in archaeological digs during a time period of great ferment and new discoveries, and personally funded a dig at Binbirkilise in Asia Minor. She travelled through the Ha'il region in the northern part of the Arabian Peninsula during an extensive trip in 1913–1914, and was one of very few Westerners to have seen the area at the time. The outbreak of World War I in August 1914, and the Ottoman Empire's entry into the war a few months later on the side of Germany, upended the status quo in the Middle East. She briefly joined the Arab Bureau in Cairo, where she worked with T. E. Lawrence. She joined the British administration in Ottoman Mesopotamia in 1917, as a political officer and as the Oriental Secretary to three High Commissioners: the only woman in such high-ranking civil roles in the British Empire. Bell also supported the cause of the largely urban Sunni population in their attempts to modernise Iraq.

She spent much of the rest of her life in Baghdad and was a key player in the nation-building of what would eventually become the Kingdom of Iraq. She met and befriended a large number of Iraqis in both the cities and the countryside, and was a confidante and ally of Iraq's new King Faisal. Toward the end of her life, she was sidelined from Iraqi politics. Faisal appointed her the Honorary Director of Antiquities of Iraq, where she returned to her original love of archaeology. In that role, she helped modernise procedures and catalogue findings, which helped prevent unauthorized looting of artifacts. She supported education for Iraqi women, served as president of the Baghdad library (the future Iraq National Library), and founded the Iraq Museum as a place to display the country's archaeological treasures. She died in 1926 of an overdose of sleeping pills in what was possibly a suicide, although she was in ill health regardless.

Bell wrote extensively. She translated a book of Persian poetry; published multiple books describing her travels, adventures, and excavations; and sent a steady stream of letters back to England during World War I that influenced government thinking in an era when few English people were familiar with the contemporary Middle East.

== Early life ==
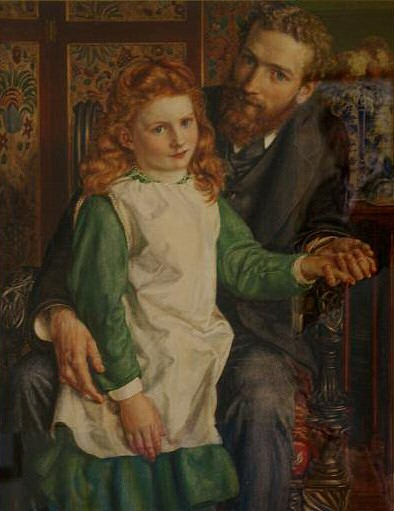
1876 portrait of Sir Hugh Bell and his 8-year-old daughter Gertrude. Portrait by Edward Poynter.

Gertrude Bell was born on 14 July 1868 in Washington New Hall—now known as Dame Margaret Hall—in Washington, County Durham, England. Her family was wealthy, which enabled both her higher education and her travels. Her grandfather was the ironmaster Sir Isaac Lowthian Bell, an industrialist and a Liberal Member of Parliament between 1875 and 1880. Mary Bell (née Shield), the daughter of John Shield of Newcastle-on-Tyne and Gertrude's mother, died in 1871 while giving birth to a son, Maurice Bell (later the 3rd Baronet). Gertrude Bell was just three at the time, and the death led to a lifelong close relationship with her father, Sir Hugh Bell, 2nd Baronet, a progressive capitalist and mill owner who made sure his workers were well paid. Throughout her life, Gertrude consulted on matters great and small with her father, her personal role model. In particular, Hugh shared his knowledge of government and access to highly placed officials with Gertrude.

When Gertrude was seven years old, her father remarried, providing her a stepmother, Florence Bell (née Olliffe), and eventually, three half-siblings. Florence Bell was a playwright and author of children's stories, as well as the author of a study of Bell factory workers. She instilled concepts of duty and decorum in Gertrude. She also recognized her intelligence and contributed to her intellectual development by ensuring she received an excellent schooling. Florence Bell's activities with the wives of Bolckow Vaughan ironworkers in Eston, near Middlesbrough, may have helped influence her step-daughter's later promotion of education for Iraqi women. Some biographies suggest the loss of her mother Mary caused underlying childhood trauma, revealed through periods of depression and risky behaviour. While this loss surely marked her, Gertrude and Florence had a positive and lifelong relationship.

From 1883 to 1886, Gertrude Bell attended Queen's College in London, a prestigious school for girls. At the age of 17, she then studied at Lady Margaret Hall, Oxford University. History was one of the few subjects women were allowed to study, due to the many restrictions imposed on them at the time. She specialised in modern history, and she was the first woman to graduate in Modern History at Oxford with a first class honours degree, a feat she achieved in only two years. Eleven people graduated that year. Nine were recorded because they were men, and the other two were Bell and Alice Greenwood. However, the two women were not awarded degrees. It was not until decades later that Oxford treated women equally with men in this respect, retroactively awarding degrees to Bell and others in 1920.

== Personal life ==
Bell never married or had children. After graduating from Oxford, she spent two and a half years, from 1890 to 1892, attending the London social rounds of balls and banquets where eligible young men and women paired off, but failed to find a match. After arriving in Persia in 1892, she courted Henry Cadogan, a mid-ranking British diplomat in Tehran, but was refused permission to marry him after her father discovered that Cadogan was deeply in debt and not her social equal. Cadogan died in 1893; Bell received the news via telegram. She befriended British colonial administrator Sir Frank Swettenham on a visit to Singapore with her brother Hugo in 1903 and maintained a correspondence with him until 1909. She had a "brief but passionate affair" with Swettenham following his retirement to England in 1904. She had an unconsummated affair with Major Charles Doughty-Wylie, a married man, with whom she exchanged love letters from 1913 to 1915. Doughty-Wylie died in April 1915 during the Gallipoli Campaign, a loss which devastated Bell.

== Travels and writings ==
Bell's uncle, Sir Frank Lascelles, was British minister (similar to ambassador) at Tehran, Persia. Bell travelled to Persia to visit him, arriving in May 1892. She stayed for around six months and loved the experience; she called Persia "paradise" in a letter home. She described her experiences in her book Persian Pictures, which was published in 1894. She spent much of the next decade travelling around the world, mountaineering in Switzerland, and developing a passion for archaeology and languages. She became fluent in Arabic, Persian (Farsi), French, German, Italian, and Turkish. In 1897, she published a well-regarded translation from Persian into English of the poems of The Divān of Hafez; her work was later praised by Edward Denison Ross, E. Granville Browne, and others. Her horse riding skills, practised from a young age, would aid her in her travels.

In 1899, Bell again went to the Middle East. She visited historic Palestine and Syria that year and in 1900, on a trip from Jerusalem to Damascus, she became acquainted with the Druze living in Jabal al-Druze.

Between 1899 and 1904, she climbed a number of mountains, including the La Meije and Mont Blanc, and recorded 10 new paths or first ascents in the Bernese Alps in Switzerland. One Alpine peak in the Bernese Oberland, the 2,632 m (8,635 ft) Gertrudspitze, was named after her after she and her guides, Ulrich and Heinrich Fuhrer, first traversed it in 1901. However, she failed in an attempt of the Finsteraarhorn in August 1902, when inclement weather including snow, hail and lightning forced her to spend "forty eight hours on the rope" with her guides, clinging to the rock face in terrifying conditions that nearly cost her her life. She did some further climbing in the Rocky Mountains during a trip through North America in 1903, but eased up on her mountaineering in later years.

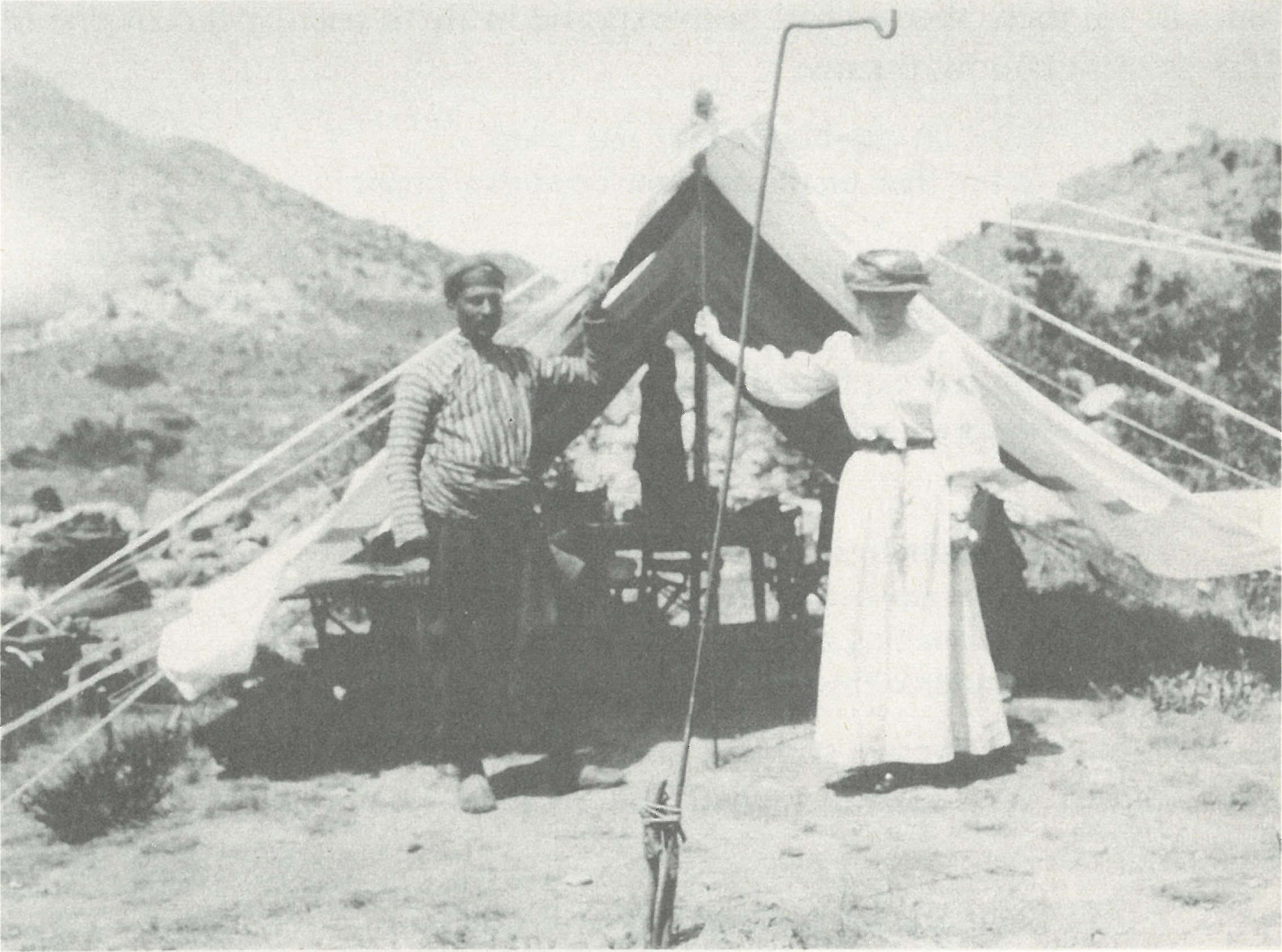
1907 photograph of Bell and Fattuh, an Arab guide who accompanied her on many of her trips

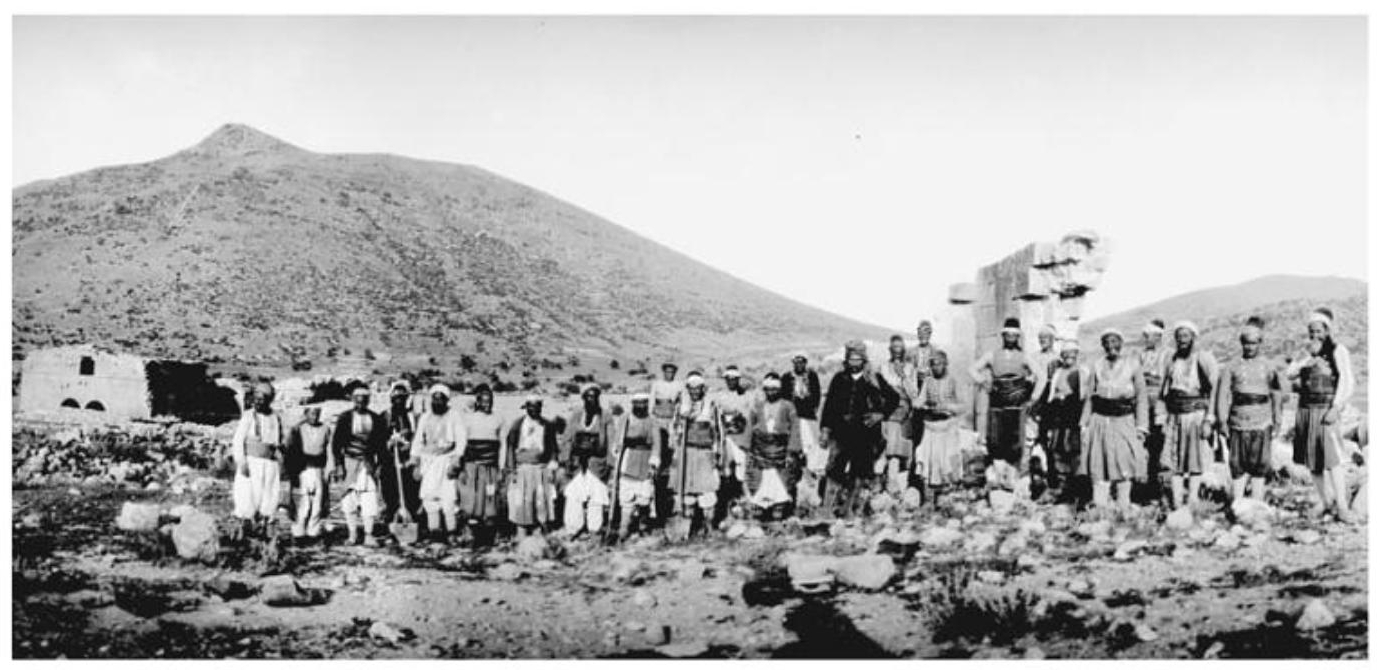
Bell's workers at the Binbirkilise excavations in 1907

In 1905, she returned to the region of Syria. She met Mark Sykes, then a British traveller. The two quarrelled and shared a mutual dislike of each other that would last until 1912, when they made up. She concluded her trip visiting archaeological sites in Asia Minor and visiting Constantinople. She published her observations of the Middle East in the 1907 book Syria: The Desert and the Sown. In it she vividly described, photographed, and detailed her trip to Greater Syria including Damascus, Jerusalem, Beirut, Antioch, Alexandretta, and the lands of the Druze and of the Bedouin. The Desert and the Sown was well received in the western world; the book received positive reviews and was a success. A notable epithet of Bell's came from her trip to Syria, where one particular compliment from a Bani Sakher tribesman she recorded became part of her later public image: "Mashallah! Bint aarab." Literally, it meant "As God wills it, a daughter of the Arabs," but she translated it as being called a "daughter of the desert."

In March 1907, Bell journeyed back to Asia Minor (Anatolia) and began to work with Sir William M. Ramsay, an archaeologist and New Testament scholar. The pair and their staff performed excavations of destroyed buildings and churches that dated from the Byzantine era in Binbirkilise, which she funded and planned. The results were chronicled in the book A Thousand and One Churches.

In January 1909, Bell left for Mesopotamia. She visited the Hittite city of Carchemish, photographed the relief carvings in Halamata Cave, mapped and described the ruin of Ukhaidir, and travelled on to Babylon and Najaf. In Carchemish, she consulted with the two archaeologists on site, T. E. Lawrence and Reginald Campbell Thompson. She struck up a friendship with Lawrence, and the two would trade letters in the following years. Both Bell and Lawrence had attended Oxford and earned a First Class Honours in Modern History, both spoke fluent Arabic, and both travelled extensively in the Arabian desert and established ties with the local tribes. In 1910, Bell visited the Munich exhibition Masterpieces of Muhammadan Art. In a letter to her stepmother, she recounts how she had the research room to herself and spoke to some Syrians from Damascus who were part of the ethnographic section of the exhibition. She wrote a book on her journey and the archaeological work, Amurath to Amurath, as well as a journal article.

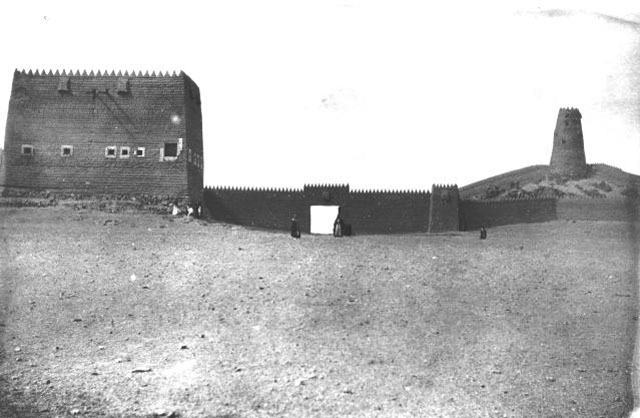
A picture, taken by Bell in 1913, of the gates of Ha'il which was then part of the Rashidi Emirate

In 1913, she completed her last and most arduous Arabian journey, travelling about 1800 miles from Damascus to the politically volatile Ha'il, back up across the Arabian peninsula to Baghdad and from there back to Damascus. She was only the second foreign woman to visit Ha'il (Lady Anne Blunt was the first). Unbeknownst to outsiders, the Rashidi dynasty had been ravaged by both war with Ibn Saud's forces and internecine rivalries; the Emir and oldest dynasty member was only 16 years old; assassinations and disputes had killed others of the bloodline. Bell was held prisoner in the city for eleven days before being released. She wrote afterward that "In Hayil, murder is like the spilling of milk." At the conclusion of her trip in Baghdad, Bell met the influential Naqib, Abd Al-Rahman Al-Gillani, who would be an important political figure later after the end of Ottoman rule. Bell's travels resulted in her being elected a Fellow of the Geographical Society in 1913; she was awarded a medal from them in 1914, then another in 1918.

Throughout her travels Bell established close relations with local inhabitants and tribes across the Middle East. While she could meet with the wives and daughters of local notables without it being a breach of propriety, a possibility denied male travellers, she did not take advantage of this much; she was only mildly curious about the lives of Arab women. Her main focus was on meeting and knowing the influential in Arab society, the male shaikhs and leaders.

== War and political career ==
=== Outbreak of war ===
The British entered World War I in August 1914, and the Ottoman Empire entered the war in late October to early November. At the suggestion of Wyndham Deedes, the British War Office asked Bell for her assessment of the situation in Ottoman Syria, Mesopotamia, and Arabia. In response she wrote a letter detailing her thoughts on the degree of British sympathies in the region.

Bell volunteered with the Red Cross, serving from November 1914–November 1915; first in Boulogne, France, and then later back in London. She was part of the Wounded & Missing Enquiry Department (W&MED) that attempted to coordinate information between the British Army, French hospitals, and worried families about the status of soldiers and casualties of the war.

Coincidentally, Judith Doughty-Wylie, the wife of the man with whom Bell was having an unconsummated affair, was also stationed in Boulogne in this period. The two met and exchanged pleasantries. Bell asked Charles Doughty-Wylie in a letter to discourage his wife from any further meetings.

=== Cairo, Delhi, and Basra ===
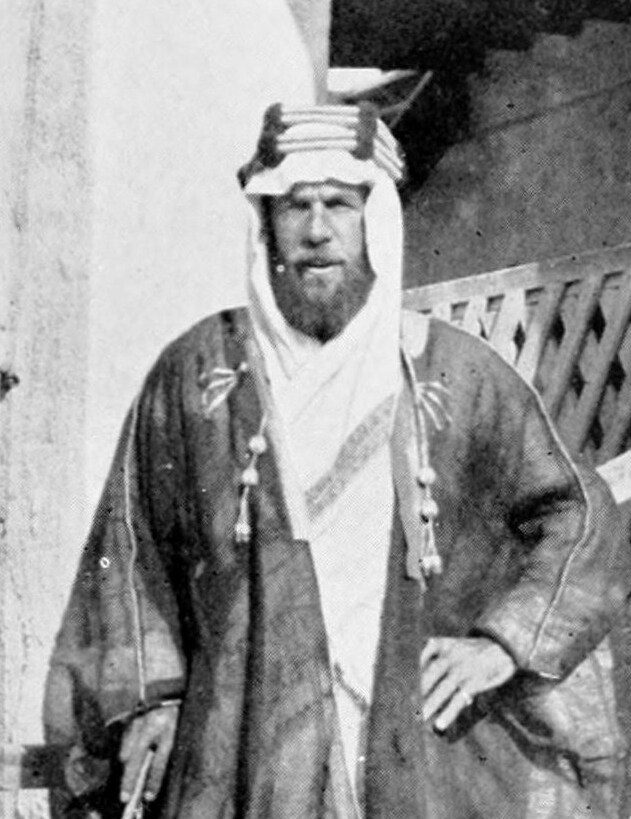
St John Philby. Philby would later fall out with Bell and Faisal in 1921; he supported a republic for Iraq, and later served Ibn Saud in what would become Saudi Arabia.

In November 1915, Bell was summoned to Cairo in the British protectorate of Egypt; she arrived on 30 November. The Cairo detachment of British officials, headed by Colonel (later Brigadier General) Gilbert Clayton and renowned archaeologist and historian Lt. Cmdr. David Hogarth, was called the Arab Bureau. Here she met T. E. Lawrence again, who had joined the Arab Bureau in December 1914. The Bureau set about organising and processing Bell's own, Lawrence's, and Capt. W. H. I. Shakespear's data about the location and disposition of Arab tribes of the Sinai and Gulf region. They also mapped the region, including its sources of water. This information would later be of use to Lawrence during the Arab Revolt as to which tribes could be encouraged to join the British against the Ottoman Empire.

Bell's stay in Cairo was short; she was soon sent to British India, arriving in February 1916, likely at the suggestion of journalist-turned-diplomat Valentine Chirol. Her task in Delhi was to better coordinate the Arab Bureau with the Government of India and mediate their differences; according to Bell, "there was no kind of touch between us except rather bad tempered written telegrams!" Lord Hardinge, Viceroy of India and family friend of the Bells, was sceptical of the Arab Bureau's recent moves and promises of an independent Arab state, fearing that directly challenging the Ottoman Sultan's religious role as caliph could stir up unrest among India's substantial minority of Muslims. Bell's knowledge of the issues impressed Lord Hardinge, and she was soon sent on to Basra (captured by the British at the start of the war in November 1914) in March 1916 to act as a liaison between India and Cairo. At the time, the British were still recovering from recent setbacks in the Mesopotamian campaign. She joined the staff of Chief Political Officer Percy Cox as one of the few Westerners who knew the area.

Cox found her an office in his headquarters, and she split her time between there and the Military GHQ Basra. She travelled in the region between Basra and Baghdad, assessed the stance and opinions of the local inhabitants, and wrote reports and drew maps that would aid the British Army in their eventual advance on Baghdad. Bell was unpaid at first, but Lord Chelmsford arranged for her to be given a formal paid position in June 1916. She became the only female political officer in the British forces and received the title of Percy Cox's Oriental Secretary. During her Basra work, she struck up close working relationships with fellow political officers Reader Bullard and the young St. John Philby.

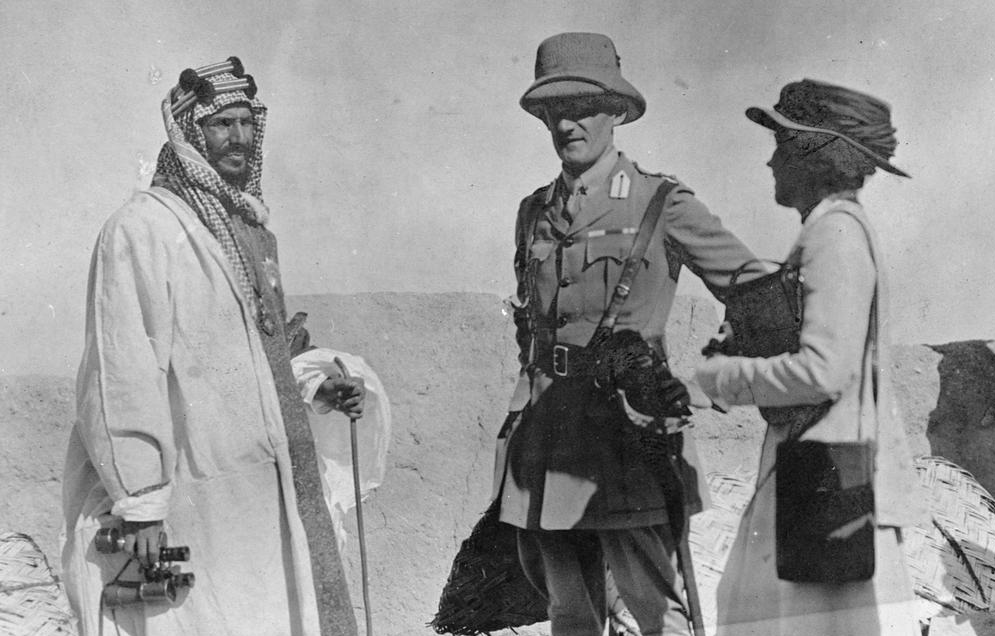
Gertrude Bell, Percy Cox, and Ibn Saud during the meeting at Basra, 1916

Bell met Ibn Saud in Basra in late November–December 1916, as Cox and India were courting his support against the Ottoman-supporting Ibn Rashid. She was impressed with him and wrote an article in the Arab Bulletin extolling his abilities as a "politician, ruler, and raider." Ibn Saud was apparently less impressed with her; according to a later account by Philby, he mimicked her feminine and higher-pitched speech as an impression and joke to later Nejd audiences. She would later, in 1920, presciently warn Lawrence that he was overestimating Sharif Hussein's position after war with Ibn Saud broke out, and that Ibn Saud was likely to defeat the Hejaz if the struggle continued.

=== Armenian genocide ===
While in the Middle East, Gertrude Bell reported on the Armenian genocide. Contrasting the killings with previous massacres, she wrote that earlier killings "were not comparable to the massacres carried out in 1915 and the succeeding years." Bell also reported that in Damascus, "Ottomans sold Armenian women openly in the public market." In an intelligence report, Bell quoted a statement by a Turkish prisoner-of-war:

The battalion left Aleppo on 3 February and reached Ras al-Ain in twelve hours....some 12,000 Armenians were concentrated under the guardianship of some hundred Kurds...These Kurds were called gendarmes, but in reality mere butchers; bands of them were publicly ordered to take parties of Armenians, of both sexes, to various destinations, but had secret instructions to destroy the males, children and old women...One of these gendarmes confessed to killing 100 Armenian men himself...the empty desert cisterns and caves were also filled with corpses...No man can ever think of a woman's body except as a matter of horror, instead of attraction, after Ras al-Ain."

=== Creation of Iraq ===
After British troops took Baghdad, on 11 March 1917, Bell was summoned by Cox to the city. She was also given the honour of Commander of the Order of the British Empire. After Cox left Mesopotamia in 1918 for England and then Persia, control fell to Arnold Wilson, the Acting British Civil Commissioner in Mesopotamia. Initially, Bell and Wilson got along; a memorandum Bell wrote in February 1919, "Self-Determination in Mesopotamia", did not show major differences with Wilson. Cox and Wilson's wartime provisional government drew on British India for inspiration, replicating its legal code and bureaucratic structure, and Bell's assessment was that this was keeping the Iraqi people content. Bell visited France and England in 1919, attending the Paris Peace Conference for a short time in Wilson's stead. At Paris, plans for the dismantling of the Ottoman Empire came into shape, as negotiations over which territories should be distributed to who took place. Famously, the Sykes–Picot Agreement, negotiated by the same Mark Sykes whom Bell had met 15 years earlier, allocated northern Syria to French influence, although the French were persuaded to withdraw their claims on Mosul vilayet to Syria's east. This left the British and Arabs with southern Syria, Mosul, Baghdad, and Basra to divide.

Bell spent September–October 1919 visiting Egypt, Palestine, and Hashemite-ruled Syria before returning to Baghdad in November 1919. In 1919, Mesopotamia was still under a provisional military government that largely reported to the government of British India. Over the course of 1919, Bell became convinced that an independent Arab government in Mesopotamia backed by British advisors was the correct path to follow. She saw the provisional Hashemite government in Syria, while corrupt, seemingly return life to a peaceful normal state; meanwhile, affairs in Egypt saw the Egyptian Revolution of 1919 against the British. Bell believed that the "spirit of 1919" would spread to Mesopotamia as well if the British dawdled in honouring the promise of self-determination. She spent nearly a year writing what was later considered a masterly official report, "Review of the Civil Administration of Mesopotamia". Civil Commissioner Wilson disagreed with Bell on the topic, and the two had a falling out. Wilson, of the India school, preferred an Arab government to be under direct influence of British officials who would retain real control, as he felt, from experience, that Mesopotamian populations were not yet ready to govern and administer the country efficiently and peacefully. Troubles arose; Shia tribes in central Iraq rose in revolt in the summer of 1920, and made common cause with Sunnis. Wilson blamed Sharifan anti-British propaganda for the revolt. Bell blamed Wilson for the unrest in the region, saying his approach was insufficiently deferential to local wishes.

On 11 October 1920, Percy Cox returned to Baghdad, replacing the discredited Wilson. Cox asked Bell to continue as his Oriental Secretary and to act as liaison with the forthcoming Arab government. Cox promptly restored much of the earlier Ottoman government structure and began to appoint more Iraqis to lead in the local provincial governments, albeit backed by powerful British advisors. Back in the British Isles, the British public was weary of constant war, the Irish War of Independence was being fought, and the British Empire was deeply in debt following the ruinous Great War. British officials in London, in particular the new Secretary of State for War and Air, Winston Churchill, wanted to reduce expenses in the colonies, including the cost of quashing revolts. British officials realised that their policy of direct governance was adding to costs. While the revolt of 1920 was successfully suppressed, it had cost 50 million pounds, hundreds of British and Indian lives, and thousands of Arab lives to do so. It was clear that Iraq would be cheaper as a self-governing state. Churchill convened a conference in Cairo to resolve the future of British administration of the region now that the war was finished.

=== 1921 Cairo Conference ===
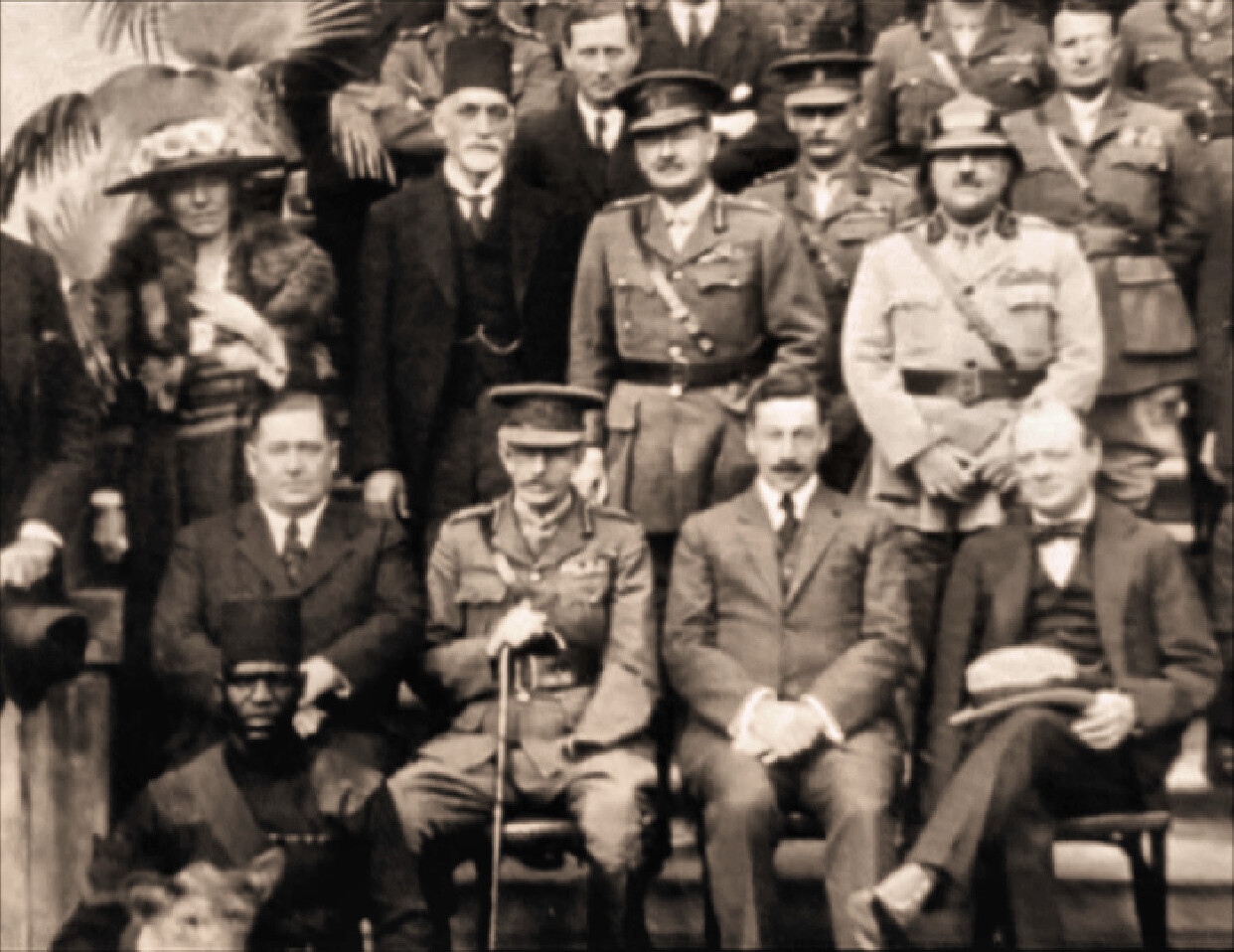
Seated, from right: Winston Churchill, Herbert Samuel. Standing first row, from left: Gertrude Bell, Sassoon Eskell, Edmund Allenby, Jafar Pasha al-Askari.

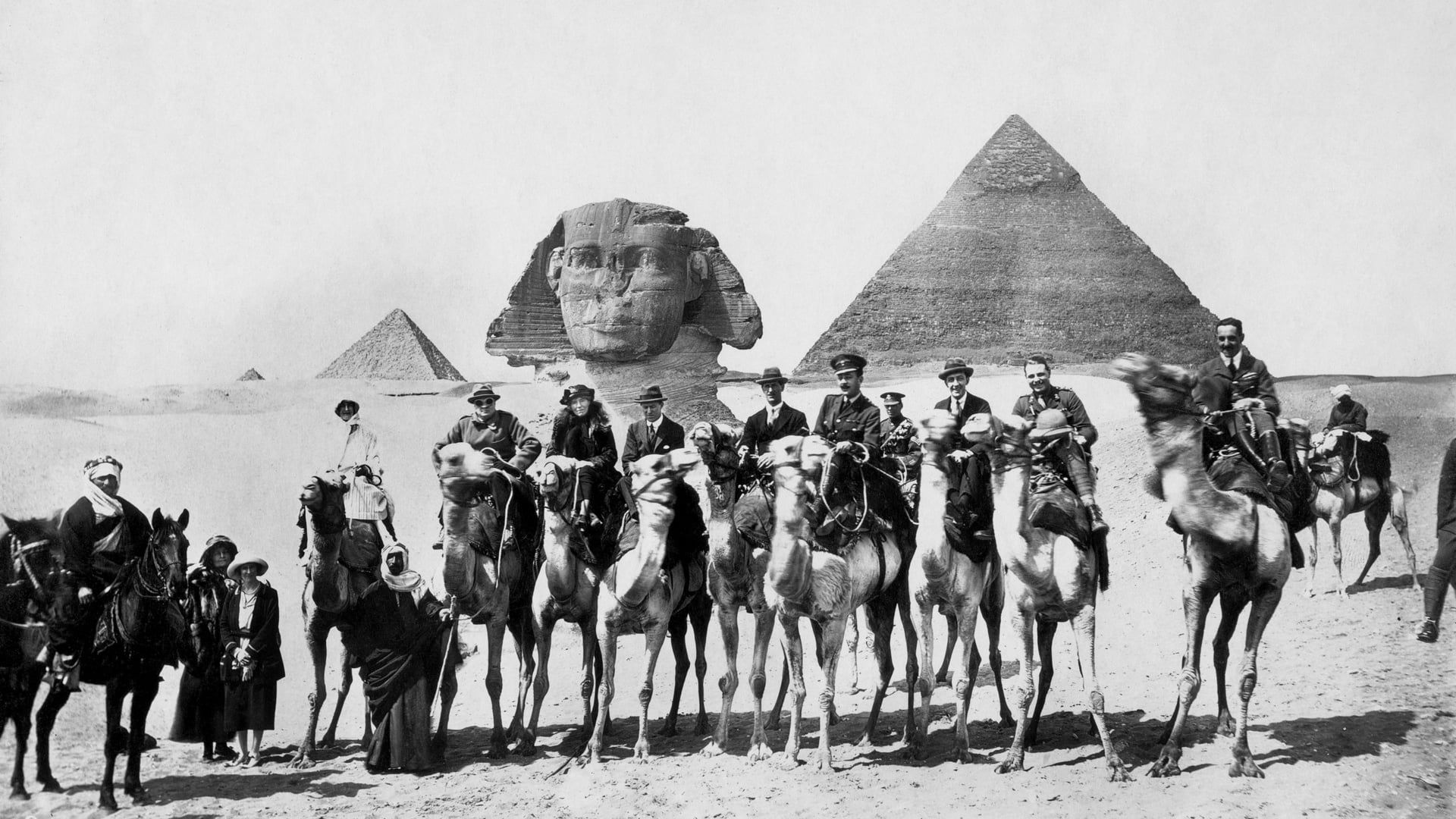
Photograph taken near the pyramids; Bell is between Churchill and T. E. Lawrence beneath the Sphinx

Bell, Cox, and Lawrence were among a select group of "Orientalists" convened by Churchill to attend the conference in Cairo to determine the internal boundaries of the British mandates from within the territory Britain had claimed during the Partitioning of the Ottoman Empire. Few British officials had any experience in Arab or Kurdish affairs; Cox trusted Bell, and Bell was thus unusually influential and gave significant input in these discussions. The British government had reluctantly allowed France to take control of Syria as part of negotiations of the Treaty of Sèvres, leading to the creation of the French Mandate for Syria and Lebanon. This complicated earlier British promises to its allies in the Arab Revolt against the Ottomans, as they had presumed they would lead a new pan-Arab state centred in Damascus; but the French saw the Hashemites and their allies as potential rivals for power, and thus had no interest in allowing a Hashemite monarchy in Syria.

Various possibilities existed for these lands, including a continued direct mandate (the British Mandate for Mesopotamia), independence on various terms, or even ceding the discontented northern territories back to the new Turkish state. The school of thought that favoured independence with British direction and alliance became known as the "Cairo School", against the "India School" that favoured direct rule by Britons. Throughout the conference, Bell, Cox, and Lawrence favoured the Cairo School approach, and worked to promote the establishment of the independent countries of Transjordan and Iraq. They also supported the Sharifian Solution: that these states be presided over by the sons of the instigator of the Arab Revolt, Hussein bin Ali, Sharif of Mecca. In this proposal, Abdullah and Faisal would serve as the kings of the new countries (the eventual Monarchy of Jordan and Monarchy of Iraq). Bell thought that Faisal's status as an outsider would enable him to hold together the new country of Iraq as someone not beholden to any one group, but rather a unifying symbol. In theory, Shias would respect him because of his lineage from Muhammad; Sunnis would follow him because he was Sunni from a respected family. In practice, pan-Arabism and Sharifism would prove more appealing to the Sunni population in Iraq than the Shia population. Bell was also influenced by a strain of British thought that romantically considered the desert Arabs of the Hejaz as "pure" Arabs, and thus naturally suited to possessing legitimacy and respect; the success of Faisal in the Arab Revolt at assembling a coalition of disparate tribes acted as proof to this school.

The Ottomans had divided the region into the strategically important for the British Basra vilayet in the south, the central Baghdad vilayet, and the northern Kurdish-dominated Mosul vilayet. The three had little cultural or economic interdependency under Ottoman rule. The territory of the new Iraq was an undecided matter before the conference. The question of what to do with oil-rich Mosul in particular became known as the Mosul question. Bell advocated for expansive Iraqi borders that would include all three of the Ottoman territories including Mosul. In this, she was defeated at the conference; Churchill, Hubert Young, Lawrence, and others feared that putting Kurds under an Arab ruler might make them sympathetic to Turkey and disloyal to Iraq, while establishing an independent buffer state of Southern Kurdistan or Upper Mesopotamia would ensure the Kurds would see any Turkish incursion as unwelcome rather than a liberation. They insisted that the Southern Kurds only be included in Iraq if they directly asked to be. Bell would eventually get her way after the conference, though. In the process of the largely performative nationwide referendum to endorse Faisal of 1921, the referendum takers were able to find enough pro-Faisal members of Kurdish elite to satisfy the new British government of late 1922 to allow the inclusion of Mosul as part of Iraq after all. The Kurdish elite had extracted certain promises for autonomy, but these promises would be largely ignored. Bell wrote a letter in 1924 responding to an article likely from Arnold Wilson that argued Mosul would be happier under Turkish rule; Bell argued that based on the elite representatives to the Constituent Assembly, Mosul still wished to be part of Iraq. Negotiations and occasional warfare with Kemalist Turkey would continue until 1926, when the Treaty of Ankara recognized Mosul as part of Iraq. Lawrence would later write that he often feared and sometimes hoped that the over-large state Bell had built would collapse.

Against the wishes of the Arab-sympathetic Bell, the British would eventually decide to keep the British Mandate for Palestine to be run directly by themselves, rather than make it part of Transjordan. Bell opposed the Zionist movement; she wrote that she regarded the Balfour Declaration with "the deepest mistrust" and that "It's like a nightmare in which you foresee all the horrible things which are going to happen and can't stretch out your hand to prevent them". In a letter to her mother she wrote that "the country is wholly unsuited to the ends the Jews have in view; a poor land, incapable of great development and with a solid two thirds of its population Mohammedan Arabs who look on Jews with contempt," and described the Balfour Declaration as "a wholly artificial scheme divorced from all relation to facts and I wish it the ill-success it deserves".

=== Advisor to Faisal ===
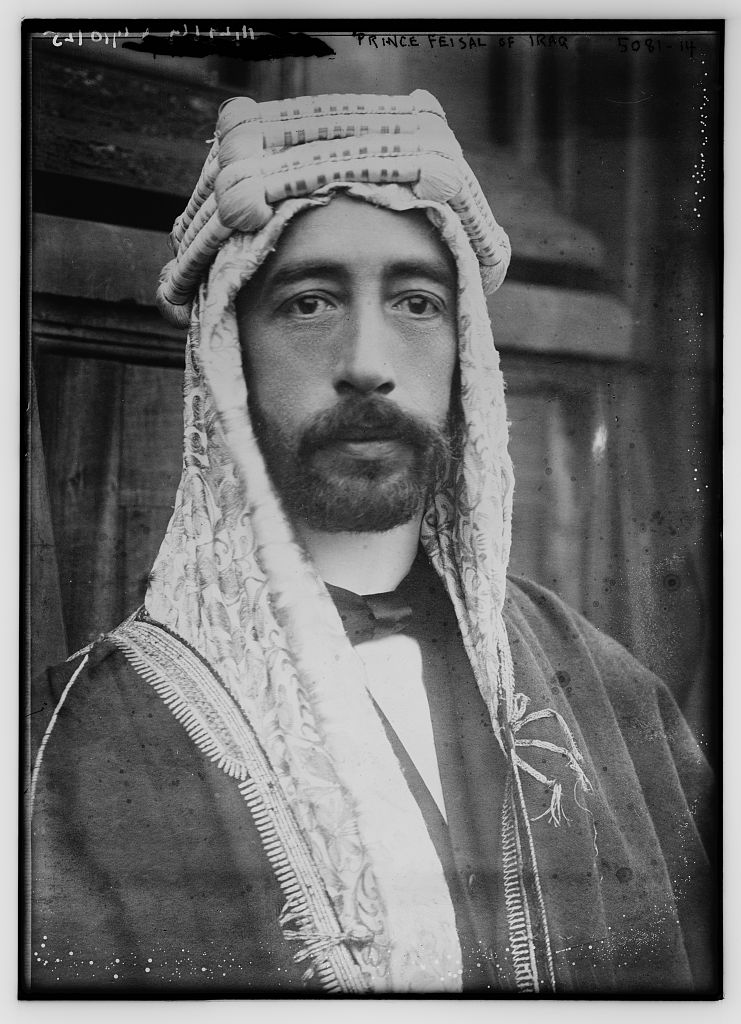
King Faisal; photo from c. 1915–1920

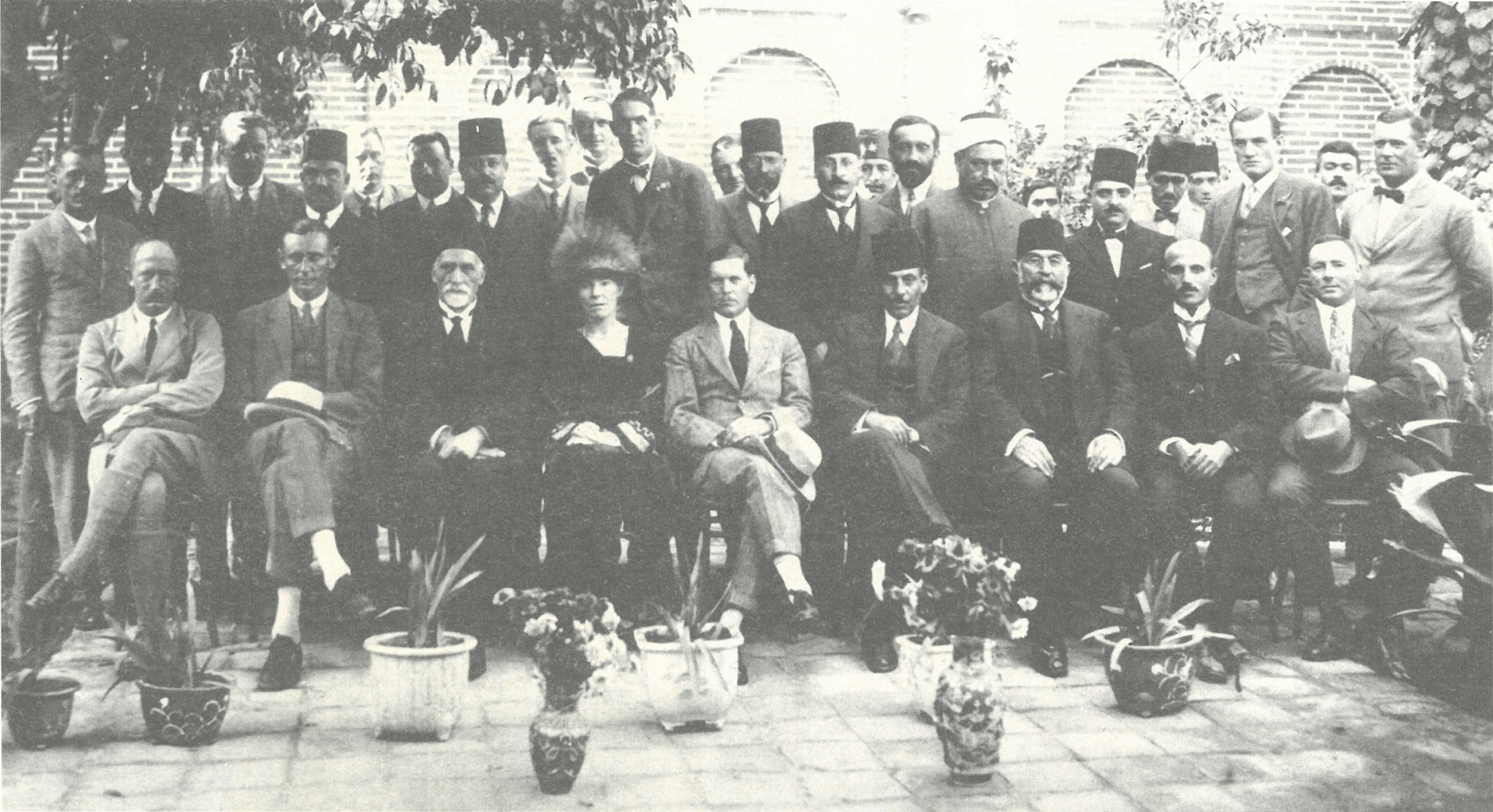
British and Iraqi dignitaries in Baghdad from 1923 during the era of Mandatory Iraq. From second left to right in the front row, Kinahan Cornwallis, Sassoon Eskell, and Gertrude Bell. Bernard Henry Bourdillon stands directly behind Bell in the second row.

The Sharifan solution prevailed, and Faisal was presented to Iraq as the new king. The main local candidate for leadership who had opposed the selection of Faisal, Sayyid Talib, was arrested and exiled in April 1921 after being invited to tea with Percy Cox's wife, at Bell's suggestion and with Cox's assent; Bell viewed Talib as a potential rebel if left unchecked.

Bell served in the Iraq British High Commission advisory group throughout the 1920s and was an integral part of the administration of Iraq in Faisal's first years. Upon Faisal's arrival in 1921, Bell advised him on local questions, including matters involving tribal geography, tribal leadership, and local business. Faisal was crowned king of Iraq on 23 August 1921. Referred to in Iraqi Arabic as "al-Khatun" (a Lady of the Court), Bell was a confidante of Faisal and helped ease his passage into the role. Bell played the role of mediator between Faisal's government, British officials, and local notables. She took a special interest in public relations: arranging receptions, parties, and meetings; discussing the state of affairs with both the British and Arab elite of Baghdad; and transferring requests and complaints to the government. She also suggested designs for both the flag of Iraq and Faisal's personal flag.

The new Iraqi government had to mediate between the various groups of Iraq: Shias, Sunnis, Kurds, Jews, and Assyrian Christians. Keeping these groups content was essential for political balance in Iraq and for British imperial interests. An important project for both the British and the new Iraqi government was creating a new identity for these people so that they would identify themselves as one nation. One of the main issues that faced Faisal was establishing his legitimacy among the Shia population. There was little enthusiasm for Faisal when he landed at the Shia port of Basra. Faisal's administration, while reserving certain positions for Shiites as a token, was pan-Arabist and Sunni-dominated, a position that Bell endorsed. Sunni elites made it clear that they would consider any reduction of their traditional privileges during Ottoman rule, as compared to the Shiites or Kurds, a betrayal. Bell feared that Shia leaders would not respect the ideals of modernism nor secularism if put in positions of power in government, and would move toward a theocracy. Bell had difficulty making close relationships with the most important Shia leaders; she wrote that she was "cut off from them because their tenets forbid them to look upon an unveiled woman and my tenets don't permit me to veil."

Bell did not find working with the new king to be easy; she wrote in one 1921 letter that "You may rely upon one thing — I'll never engage in creating kings again; it's too great a strain."

=== National Library of Iraq ===
Muriel Forbes advocated for the creation of a new library in Baghdad in 1919–20 and founded the Baghdad Peace Library (Maktabat al-Salam). Bell energetically promoted the library and subsequently served on its Library Committee as president from 1921 to 1924. This included participating in fund-raising events, soliciting free copies of books from British publishers for library use, and publishing articles in the library's Review. The library started as a private, subscription library, but due to financial difficulties, it was taken over by the Ministry of Education in 1924 and changed into a public library. In 1926, it was one of only two public libraries in the country. It became known as the Baghdad Public Library in 1929, and was renamed in 1961 to the National Library of Iraq.

=== Director of Antiquities ===
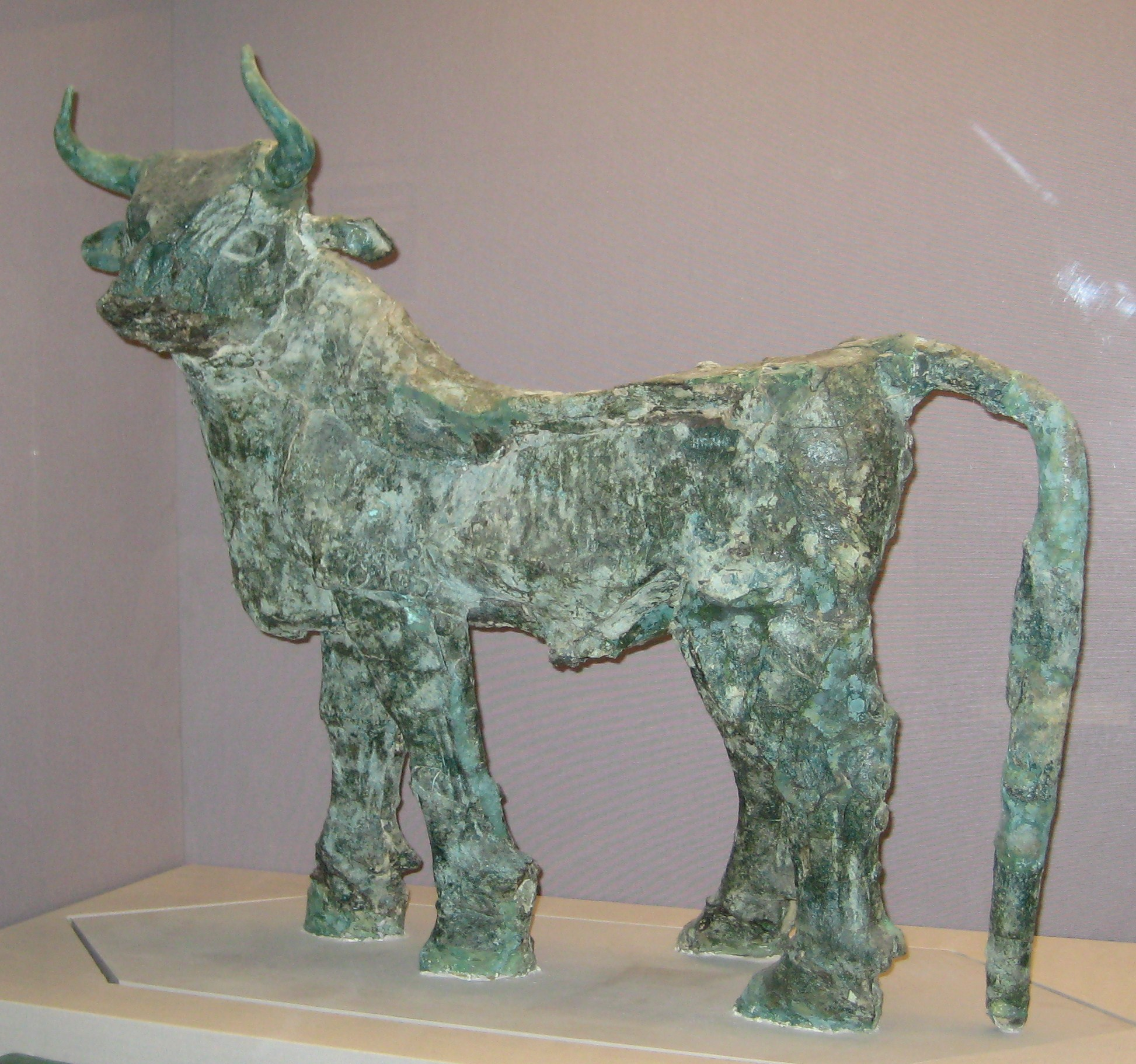
The Copper Bull, excavated in 1923 at Tell al-'Ubaid, near the ancient city of Ur. Under Bell's law, 50% of the artefacts were kept by Iraq, and 50% by the excavators; in the Ur dig, the excavators were sponsored by the British Museum and the Penn Museum.

In October 1922, King Faisal appointed Bell as Honorary Director of Antiquities, a task suited to her experience and love of archaeology. Several notable excavations took place during Bell's tenure, with Bell involved in the cataloguing and distribution of antiquities. Leonard Woolley conducted extensive excavations of the city of Ur from 1922–1934. In 1924, Bell personally invited Assyriologist Edward Chiera to conduct archaeological excavations in ancient Nuzi, near Kirkuk, Iraq, where hundreds of inscribed clay tablets had been discovered and deciphered, now known as the Nuzi Tablets.

==== 1924 Antiquities legislation ====
The state of approvals for archaeological digs during Ottoman Empire rule had been loose and unorganized; digs happened without being registered to any authority; and there was no governing body with the authority to oversee or enforce the few regulations that did exist. Bell's chief role as Director of Antiquities was to draw up proposed legislation that would clarify the status of existing digs, regulate the granting of new permits, adjudicate ownership of discovered artefacts, and allow for the creation of a Department of Antiquities to enforce the law. Bell's initial proposals were considered overly friendly to British interests by Sati' al-Husri, Faisal's Director of Education and an Arab nationalist. Al-Husri slowed passage of the law, but Bell's law passed in 1924 after revisions; it largely followed the standard model elsewhere in the world, but notably reserved extensive power to the Director (that is, herself) to judge whether discovered antiquities would go in the national museum and stay as property of the state, or be allowed for export. It also placed the Department of Antiquities under the Ministry of Public Works, away from al-Husri.

Bell's law was a hybrid that bridged the gap between the chaos of Ottoman-era archaeology and later laws that would more directly enforce Iraqi sovereignty on the matter. Foreign archaeologists continued legally exporting antiquities from Iraq, but in a more restricted manner. Simply organizing, tracking, and regulating archaeological digs seems to have hurt the black market trade in looted antiquities.

==== Baghdad Archaeological Museum ====
As Director of Antiquities, Bell was responsible for storing excavated antiquities for personal review and examination. Her initial storeroom, called the Babylonian Stone Room, was soon filling up, however. She requested a dedicated building to act as a museum in March 1923, but was initially rejected. After sustained lobbying effort over the next years, carefully ensuring that the elites of Iraqi government and society saw the latest excavations from Ur and were invested in the project at parties and events, she finally secured a location for her museum plan on the ground floor of a stationery and printing building in March 1926. This became the Baghdad Archaeological Museum, later renamed the Iraq Museum; it opened in June 1926, shortly before Bell's death.

As part of her role as Director, Bell helped establish procedures that were becoming standard around the world: carefully keeping a ledger of excavations and finds, as well as detailed descriptions of material, dimensions, and other comments; applying a formal numbering system to track them; and sending photographs of unusual finds off to the British Museum for further analysis. She did this with only a small but hard-working staff; the Department of Antiquities only consisted of Abdulqadir Pachachi, Salim Lawi and her, from 1924–26. Bell and the department helped preserve Iraqi culture and history, which included the important relics of Mesopotamian civilizations, and the museum kept them in their country of origin. Bell's will bequeathed £50,000 to the Iraq Museum and £6,000 to the British Museum to establish the "British School of Archaeology in Iraq" in London (later renamed to "The British Institute for the Study of Iraq"), which continued to fund and aid excavation projects (adjusted for inflation, around £2.1 million and £250,000 in 2021, respectively).

== Final years ==
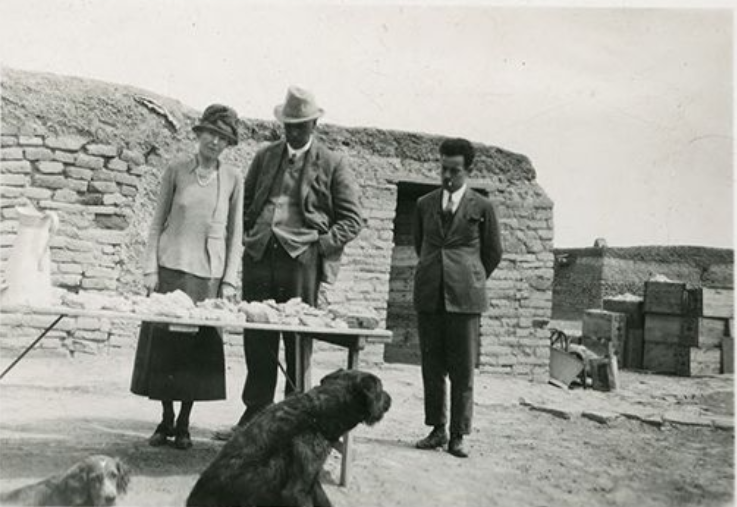
Gertrude Bell at Kish, Iraq, in March 1926

The stress of authoring a prodigious output of books, correspondence, intelligence reports, reference works, and white papers; of recurring bronchitis attacks brought on by years of heavy cigarette smoking; of bouts with malaria; and finally, of coping with Baghdad's summer heat all took a toll on her health. Somewhat frail to start with, she became emaciated over the course of the 1920s, and suffered a drastic collapse of her health in 1924. Bell briefly returned to Britain in 1925, where she faced continued ill health. She did take the opportunity to correspond with Lawrence, who sought her advice on his forthcoming book Seven Pillars of Wisdom. Her family's fortune had begun to decline due to a wave of post-World War I coal strikes in Britain that would culminate in the general strike of 1926 and economic depression in Europe; the Bells began preparation to move out of their expensive mansion at Rounton to reduce costs. She returned to Baghdad and soon developed pleurisy. While she recovered, she heard that her younger half brother Hugo had died of typhoid.

Many of Bell's dear friends left Iraq in the early 1920s, most notably Percy Cox, who retired in 1923. In late 1922, she struck up a lasting friendship with Kinahan Cornwallis, a fellow British advisor in Iraq. She signalled an openness to a romantic involvement to the much younger Cornwallis, but was rejected, and their relationship stayed a professional friendship.

Bell suffered psychologically from 1923 to 1926, and may have been depressed. The new High Commissioner of the mandate installed in 1923, Henry Dobbs, kept Bell as his Oriental Secretary but consulted her less frequently than Percy Cox had. Bell was no longer consulted by Faisal as much after his first year in office either, and he had not lived up to her impossibly high expectations. While she had thrown herself into her new position as Director of Antiquities with gusto, she still disliked being sidelined from the high affairs of state. Over the course of two days in 1925, her beloved pet dog as well as Kinahan Cornwallis's dog, whom she had looked after and cared for as well, both died.

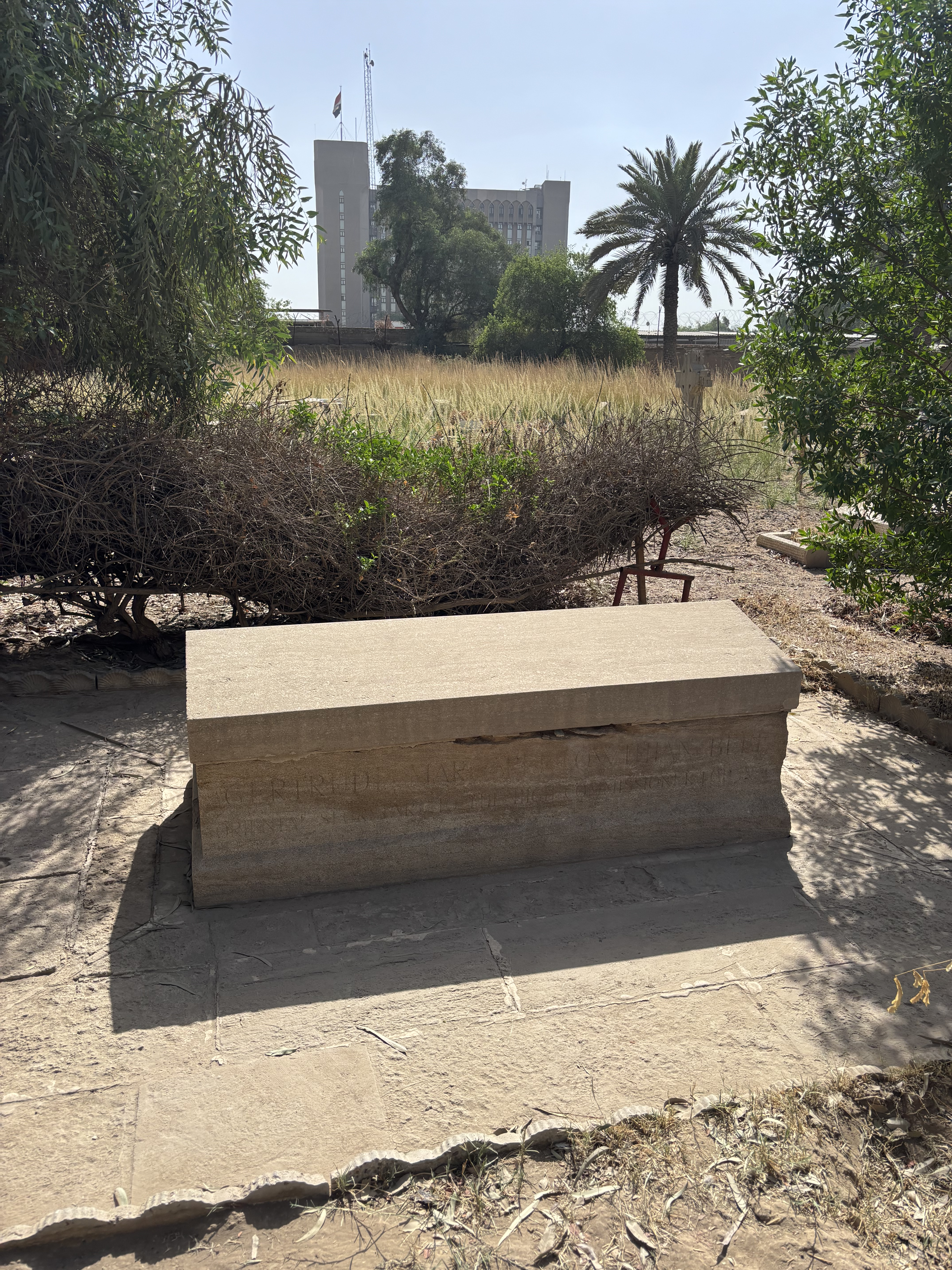
Grave of Gertrude Bell, Baghdad Iraq 2025

On 12 July 1926, Bell was discovered dead of an overdose of allobarbital sleeping pills. It is unknown whether the overdose was intentional or accidental. She had asked her maid to wake her in the morning, suggesting an accident, but, on the previous day, she had also asked Cornwallis to look after her new dog if anything happened to her, and had recently written a philosophical letter to her mother on how her lonely existence could not extend forever, suggesting foreknowledge of her death. She was buried at the Anglican cemetery in Baghdad's Bab al-Sharji district the same day. Her funeral was a major event, attended by a large crowd. It was said King Faisal watched the procession from his private balcony as they carried her coffin to the cemetery. In Britain, King George V personally wrote a letter of condolences to her parents Hugh and Florence.

== Views and positions ==
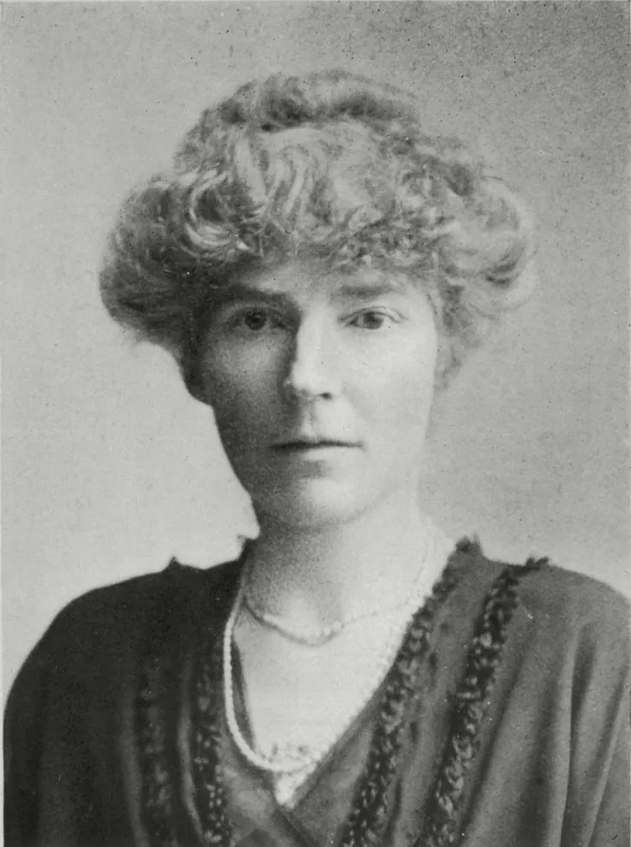
A portrait photo of Bell from around 1910

Bell's upper-class background and training in history led her to hold views that were considered old-fashioned for the time, seeming to pine for an older, nobler aristocratic age. Her historical training did aid in understanding the Middle East; many Britons of the time were essentially ignorant and uninterested in the history of the region after the era of early Christianity and the late Roman Empire. It did mean that she phrased her appeals toward Arab nationalists in the style of recreating a lost Golden Age of the early Caliphates, rather than using more modern arguments. She was simultaneously an Iraqi nationalist and a British imperialist; Bell saw no contradiction in this, although fissures between the interests of the Iraqi state and the interests of the British Empire developed almost immediately.

From an early age, Bell was outspoken and independent despite being raised in a deferential society; she was willing to verbally contest respected professors and experts during her schooling. This sometimes manifested as arrogance, especially to British people she perceived as non-experts. She was willing to back down when sparring with fellow Arabists; T. E. Lawrence writes of one incident in 1911 where she criticized the methods used at the dig at Carchemish before being reprimanded and convinced otherwise by Lawrence and Thompson. She occasionally had a contrarian bent, seemingly enjoying supporting tough causes. Bell had a rationalist perspective, and espoused atheist views. She unsuccessfully attempted to convince her half-brother Hugo not to enter the Church as a clergyman. Another contrarian position she adopted was taking an anti-suffragist position when momentum was building toward women's suffrage among women of higher education such as herself. She was a founding member of the Women's National Anti-Suffrage League in 1908 and was president of its northern branch. Her stance may have arisen from both her parents being anti-suffragists, as well as a belief that women could already be successful under the existing system without the vote. She appears to have softened on this stance later in her life after Parliament granted suffrage to women in 1918; Vita Sackville-West wrote that after visiting her in 1925, she had welcomed the move for women's rights, and had shifted from the Liberal views of her father to considering being a Labour voter.

Bell's voluminous letters document her changing and at times contradictory beliefs on the plausibility of an Arab state, the best degree of British involvement, and the challenges involved. T. E. Lawrence once remarked that she "changed her direction every time like a weathercock" (although, in the same statement, he wrote that she was a "wonderful person"). At different times, she wrote both in favour of, and against an independent Arab state, direct British rule, and the Sharifan solution. Later, she wished for Faisal to be both an independent ruler with legitimacy to Iraqis and great personal authority, yet also a ruler who simultaneously agreed with British requests and priorities: an impossible position. Still, she grasped the dangers of British involvement better than many of her contemporaries. Bell's 1920 report on the region showed striking ambivalence on the wisdom and capacity of the imperial project, depicting the tribal culture of the countryside as a centuries-long tradition that had outlasted Turkish rule and would not easily bend to outside intervention. According to a report she wrote in the Arab Bulletin:

Men who have the tradition of a personal independence which was limited only by their own customs, entirely ignorant of a world which lay outside their swamps and pasturages, and as entirely indifferent to its interests as to the opportunities it offers, will not in a day fall into step with European ambitions, nor welcome European methods. Nor can they be hastened. (...) In our own [English] history, from the Moot Court through Magna Charter to the Imperial Parliament was the work of centuries, yet the first contained the grain of all that would come after.

— Gertrude Bell, The Basis of Government in Turkish Arabia, October 1917

== Legacy ==
=== Later influence ===
The boundary lines of Iraq that emerged during the partition of the Ottoman Empire, the 1921 Cairo Conference, and the 1922 addition of Southern Kurdistan still hold today for the modern state of Iraq. The inclusion of the Kurdish-dominated Mosul vilayet in Iraq is still considered a mistake by many historians and commentators. Bell supported this inclusion of traditionally Kurdish lands in a state dominated by Arabs, however, against the advice of some of her contemporaries including T. E. Lawrence, Edward Noel, and E. B. Soane. More generally, Bell had extensive contact and personal friendships with many Arabs, but comparatively limited contact with Kurds, perhaps leading to her unfounded optimism on the wisdom of including Kurdish lands in Iraq. As part of her role in the Iraqi government, she supported suppression of Kurdish revolts of the 1920s, and did not particularly advocate for any privileges or autonomy for the region. The division of the Kurds between Iraq, Syria, Turkey, and Iran led to their oppression in all four countries. Saad Eskander wrote that Bell is more fondly remembered by Iraqi Arabs than Iraqi Kurds as a result.

Bell proposed that many aspects of government be decentralized, both because it was the only feasible way to maintain a heterogeneous multi-ethnic and multi-religion state, and due to a certain degree of parochial romanticisation of classical Arab culture. Under her Tribal Criminal and Civil Disputes Regulation, local shaikhs in the countryside had wide authority to manage tax collection and the judiciary on their own; the national government only had such authority in the major cities. Later rulers would favour a strong, centralized government and find this decentralization intrusive; Bell's law was later repealed by the new Iraqi Republic government after the overthrow of the monarchy in 1958.

Bell's work in archaeology and her tenure as Director of Antiquities is generally well-regarded. Her photographs, notes, and detailed plans of sites she visited from 1909–1914 are "priceless documentation" that preserved knowledge of many monuments and buildings since damaged or destroyed. A memorial plaque dedicated to Bell was installed at the Archaeological Museum in 1930, after King Faisal requested her memory be honored in the project to which she had devoted so much effort. However, the reputation of non-Iraqi archaeologists later suffered due to her corrupt successor as Director of Antiquities, Richard Cooke. Cooke was forced to resign in a scandal after he was caught using his position to take and smuggle antiquities for his own personal fortune. After several short-lived successors to Cooke, Sati' al-Husri, Bell's political rival, took over as Director of Antiquities in 1934. He succeeded in advocating for a new law that revised Bell's 1924 law on Antiquities. The revised 1936 legislation gave the Iraqi government additional power in the division of antiquities between archaeologists and the government.

Bell's work with the future National Library of Iraq and the library of the National Museum of Iraq was praised as helping establish the basis for libraries that would go on to be among the best in the Middle East by the 1980s. Ian Johnson praised it as a step toward bringing back a tradition of scholarship from the Abbasid Caliphate; the region had become an intellectual backwater under Ottoman rule.

=== Posthumous commentary ===
Many of Bell's compatriots wrote admiring articles, reports, and lectures upon receiving news of her death, including Vita Sackville-West, Leo Amery, Arnold Wilson, Percy Cox, Henry Dobbs, and others. An obituary written by her peer D. G. Hogarth expressed the respect British officials held for her. Hogarth wrote:

No woman in recent time has combined her qualities – her taste for arduous and dangerous adventure with her scientific interest and knowledge, her competence in archaeology and art, her distinguished literary gift, her sympathy for all sorts and condition of men, her political insight and appreciation of human values, her masculine vigour, hard common sense and practical efficiency – all tempered by feminine charm and a most romantic spirit.

Bell's 1920 white paper, "Review of the Civil Administration of Mesopotamia", possibly the first white paper composed by a woman, is considered important and influential; H. V. F. Winstone called it her "finest political work". Winstone also wrote that despite the later fall of the Kingdom of Iraq, Bell's "real work" had been her earlier role as an archaeologist, scholar, author, translator, and adventurer, a legacy that would last long after the Iraqi monarchy was forgotten.

Elie Kedourie, an Iraqi Jew who left the country to become a conservative British historian, denounced Faisal as a "pathetic incompetent", Lawrence as a "fanatic", and Bell for her "sentimental enthusiasm" and "fond foolishness" in her advocacy of an Arab state. He blamed them for unleashing Arab nationalism in a region where it had been previously unknown. Kedourie admired large multi-ethnic empires and favoured, in retrospect, Arnold Wilson's solution of direct British rule that he believed would better protect minority rights; the Iraqi Jewish community would greatly shrink in the 1940s and 50s in the face of oppression from the hostile government.

Karl E. Meyer and Shareen Blair Brysac described Bell as "one of the few representatives of His Majesty's Government remembered by the Arabs with anything resembling affection" in an overview of British policy-making following World War I.

=== Posthumous tributes ===
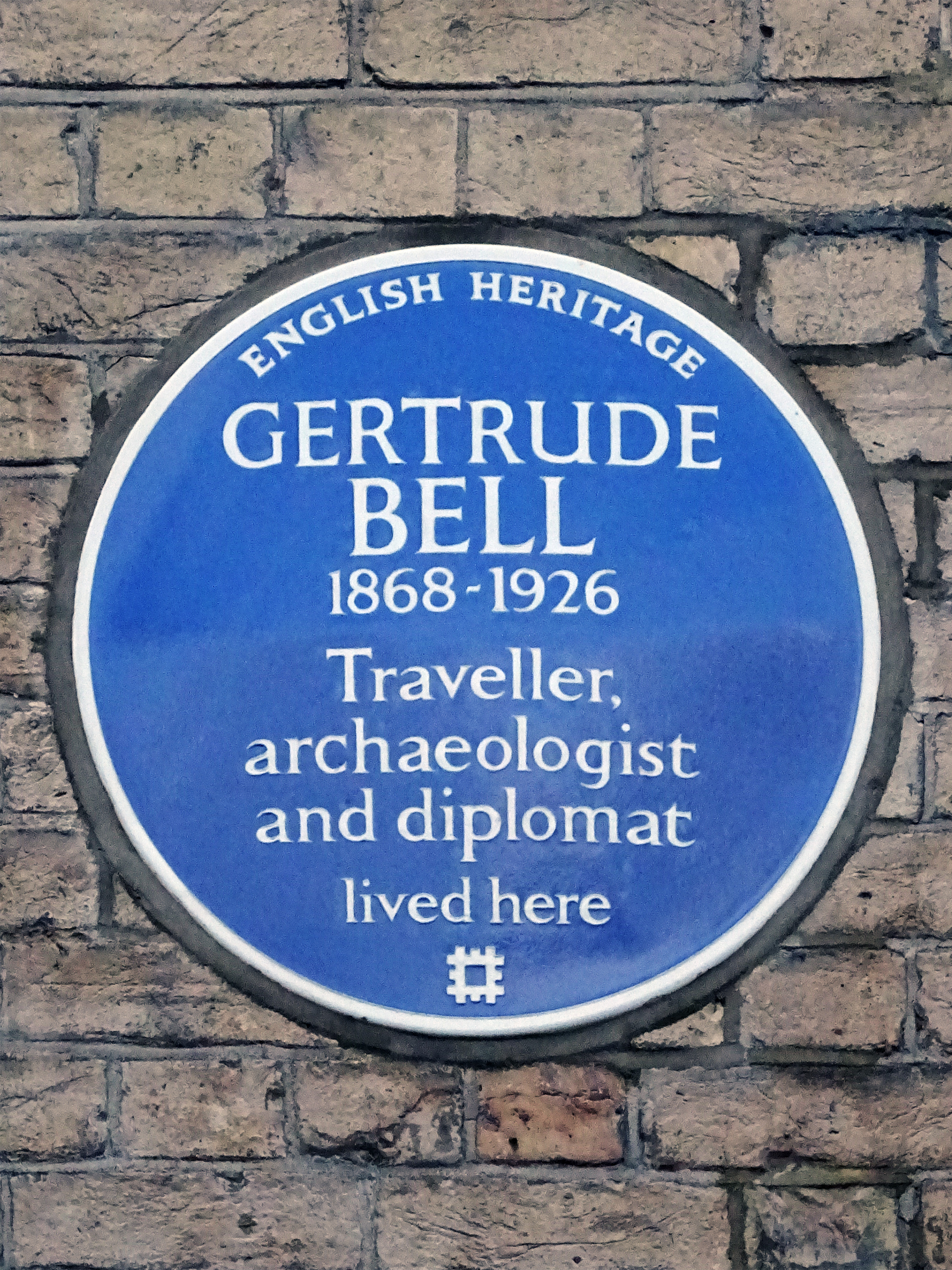
A blue plaque on a house in Sloane Street in Chelsea where Bell lived for a time

King Faisal dedicated a section of the Baghdad Archaeological Museum as a memorial to Bell in January 1930.

A stained-glass window dedicated to her memory, made by Douglas Strachan, was erected in St Lawrence's Church, East Rounton, North Yorkshire. It depicts Magdalen College, Oxford, and Khadimain, Baghdad. The inscription commemorates her as "Versed in the learning of the east and of the west, Servant of the State, Scholar, Poet, Historian, Antiquary, Gardener, Mountaineer, Explorer, Lover of Nature of Flowers and of Animals, Incomparable Friend Sister Daughter".

In the 2010s, a team from Newcastle University released a comic version of Bell's life, with John Miers the cartoonist.

In 2016, a campaign was launched to transform the Bell family's former estate, Red Barns, into a memorial and museum. The family were patrons of the Arts and Crafts movement in England, and the home, located in Redcar, features wallpaper by William Morris. Although the building is Grade II* listed, it had not been maintained. A 2015 exhibition about her at the Great North Museum in Newcastle helped raise interest. The exhibition moved to the Kirkleatham Museum in Redcar after its run in Newcastle.

The Gertrude Bell archive, an extensive record of Bell's writings held by Newcastle University, was added to the UNESCO Memory of the World Programme in 2017.

In 2019, entomologists studying wild bees in Saudi Arabia described a new genus that they named to honour Bell, as genus Belliturgula, known from the species Belliturgula najdica from central Saudi Arabia.

=== Literature ===
Olivier Guez's novel Mesopotamia, published in 2024, is a novel in French, based on the life of Gertrude Bell.

=== Film and television ===
- In the 1992 ITV television film A Dangerous Man: Lawrence After Arabia, Bell is portrayed by Gillian Barge. The film covers negotiations at the 1919 Paris Peace Conference on the future of the Middle East.
- A 1993 episode of George Lucas's The Young Indiana Jones Chronicles (later compiled in the 1996 movie-length "Winds of Change") has Bell portrayed by Anna Massey. The episode features the 1919 Paris Peace Conference, and covers her friendship with T. E. Lawrence.
- In the 2015 film Queen of the Desert by Werner Herzog, Bell is portrayed by Nicole Kidman. The film chronicles much of Bell's life.
- In the 2016 documentary Letters from Baghdad, directed by Sabine Krayenbühl and Zeva Oelbaum, quotations from Bell's letters were read by Tilda Swinton. The documentary quotes Bell's and her contemporaries' writings to tell the story of her life and the events she was a part of.

== Writings ==
Bell wrote voluminously during her life. After her death in 1926, her stepmother Florence Bell made the first attempt to curate a selection of her writing from over 2,400 pages of letters. In 1927, Florence published two volumes of Gertrude's collected correspondence, albeit not including her more romantic letters out of propriety, as well as omitting material she thought might be embarrassing to the Iraqi government. Since then, various collections of Bell's letters, journal articles, reports, and wartime Arab Bulletin articles have been published.

=== Selected works ===
- Bell, Gertrude (1896). Persian Pictures. London: Richard Bentley and Son.
- Hafez (1897). Poems from the Divan of Hafiz. Translated by Bell, Gertrude. London: Heinemann.
- Bell, Gertrude (1907). Syria: The Desert and the Sown. New York: E. P. Dutton.
- Bell, Gertrude; Ramsay, William Mitchell (1907). The Thousand and One Churches. London: Hodder and Stroughton.
- Bell, Gertrude (1911). Amurath to Amurath. London: William Heinemann Ltd. (1924 reprinting)
- Bell, Gertrude (1914). The Palace and Mosque of Ukhaidir: A Study in Early Mohammadan Architecture. Oxford: Clarendon Press.
- Bell, Lady Florence, ed. (1927). The Letters of Gertrude Bell. London: Ernest Benn Ltd. 2 volumes. (Project Gutenberg Australia version)
- Cornwallis, Kinahan, ed. (1940). The Arab war; confidential information for General headquarters from Gertrude Bell, being despatches from the secret "Arab bulletin". Golden Cockerel Press.
- Burgoyne, Elizabeth, ed. (1961). Gertrude Bell: From Her Personal Papers. London: Ernest Benn Ltd. 2 volumes: Volume 1, 1889–1914; Volume 2, 1914–1926.
- Mango, Marlia Mundell, ed. (1989). The Churches and Monasteries of Tur'Abdin. Pindar Press.
- Howell, Georgina, ed. (2015). A Woman in Arabia: The Writings of the Queen of the Desert. London: Penguin.

== See also ==
- List of mountains of Switzerland named after people

== Bibliography ==
- Bell, Gertrude (2000). O'Brien, Rosemary (ed.). Gertrude Bell: The Arabian Diaries, 1913–1914. Syracuse University Press. ISBN 978-0-8156-0672-7.
- Bodley, Ronald; Hearst, Lorna (1940). Gertrude Bell. New York: The Macmillan Company.
- Collins, Paul; Tripp, Charles, eds. (2017). Gertrude Bell and Iraq: A Life and Legacy. Oxford: British Academy. doi:10.5871/bacad/9780197266076.003.0011. hdl:10059/2333. ISBN 978-0-19-726607-6. S2CID 164903820.
- Faught, C. Brad (2022). Cairo 1921: Ten Days that Made the Middle East. Yale University Press. ISBN 978-0-300-25674-1.
- Howell, Georgina (2008) [2006]. Gertrude Bell: Queen of the Desert, Shaper of Nations (Paperback ed.). Farrar, Straus and Giroux. ISBN 978-0-374-53135-5.
  - Also issued as Howell, Georgina (2006). Daughter of the Desert: The remarkable life of Gertrude Bell (Hardback ed.). Macmillan. ISBN 1-4050-4587-6.
  - Howell, Georgina (2007) [2006]. Queen of the Desert: The Extraordinary Life of Gertrude Bell (Paperback ed.). Pan Macmillan. ISBN 978-1-4472-8626-4.
- Lukitz, Liora (2013) [2006]. A Quest in the Middle East: Gertrude Bell and the Making of Modern Iraq. I.B. Tauris. ISBN 978-1-78076-6812.
- Meyer, Karl E.; Brysac, Shareen Blair (2008). Kingmakers: The Invention of the Modern Middle East. W. W. Norton. pp. 157–192. ISBN 978-0-393-33770-9.
- Wallach, Janet (2005) [1996]. Desert Queen. Anchor Books. ISBN 1-4000-9619-7.
- Winstone, H. V. F. (1993) [1978]. Gertrude Bell. Constable and Company Ltd. ISBN 978-0-9547728-0-2.
