= Sassoon Eskell =

Minister of Finance of Iraq (1921–1925)

Sir Sassoon Eskell KBE Effendi
- ساسون حسقيل
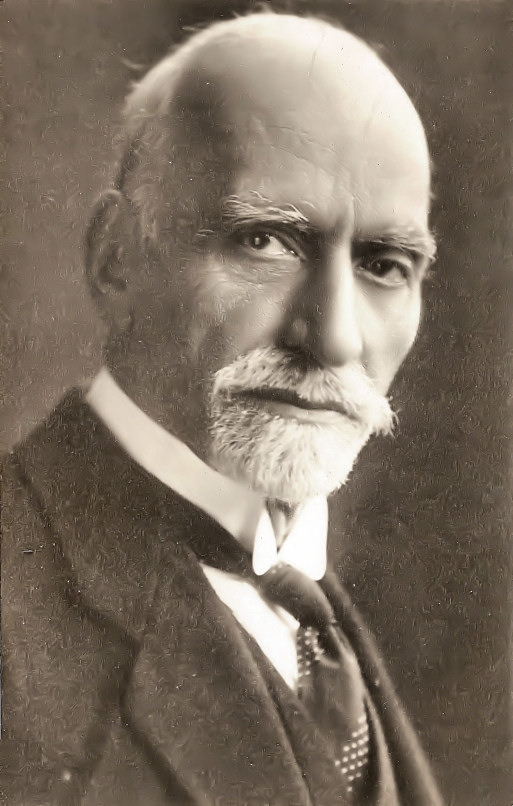

Deputy for the Iraqi Parliament
- In office 1925–1932
- Constituency: Baghdad

Minister of Finance
- In office 1 September 1921 – 1925
- Monarch: Faisal I
- Prime Minister: Yasin al-Hashimi; Jafar al-Askari; Abd al-Muhsin as-Sa'dun; Abd Al-Rahman Al-Gillani
- Preceded by: Position established
- Succeeded by: Abdul Muhsin al-Sa'dun

Personal details
- Born: 17 March 1860 Baghdad, Ottoman Iraq
- Died: 31 August 1932 (aged 72) Paris, France
- Resting place: Père Lachaise Cemetery, Paris
- Profession: Statesman, financier

Sir Sassoon Eskell, KBE (Arabic: ساسون حسقيل; 17 March 1860 – 31 August 1932), also known as Sassoon Effendi, was an Iraqi statesman, politician and financier. He is regarded in Iraq as the Father of Parliament. Eskell was the first Minister of Finance in the Kingdom and a permanent Member of Parliament until his death. Along with Gertrude Bell and T. E. Lawrence, he was instrumental in creating and establishing the Kingdom of Iraq post-Ottoman rule, and he founded the nascent Iraqi government's laws and financial structure.

Eskell was one of the most prominent Jews in Iraq. He was knighted by King George V in 1923. King Faisal I conferred on him the Civil Rafidain Medal Grade II, the Shahinshah awarded him the Shir-o-khorshi medal and the Ottoman Empire decorated him with the Al-Moutamayez Medal.

== Early life ==
Heskel Shlomo David, father of Sassoon, in India

Scion of an ancient, distinguished and aristocratic Jewish family of great affluence, the Shlomo-David's, Sassoon was born on 17 March 1860 in Baghdad, Iraq. He was a cousin of the celebrated English war poet and author Siegfried Sassoon, through their common ancestor, Heskel Elkebir (1740–1816). His father was Hakham Heskel, Shalma, Ezra, Shlomo-David, a student of Hakham Abdallah Somekh. In 1873 Heskel travelled to India to become the Chief Rabbi and Shohet of the thriving Baghdadi Jewish Community there. In 1885 he returned to Baghdad as the leading rabbinical authority and a great philanthropist. A wealthy man, in 1906 he built Slat Hakham Heskel, one of the most prominent synagogues in Baghdad. His father patriarch of the Eskell line of the Shlomo David dynasty

Family of Sassoon

Sassoon obtained his primary education at the Alliance Israélite Universelle in Baghdad. In 1877, at age 17, he travelled to Constantinople to continue his education, accompanied by his maternal uncle, the immensely wealthy magnate and land owner Menahem Saleh Daniel who was elected deputy for Baghdad to the first Ottoman Parliament in 1876 during the reign of Sultan Abdul Hamid II and later became Senator of the Kingdom of Iraq (1925–1932). Sassoon then went to London and Vienna at the Diplomatic Academy of Vienna to receive his higher education in economics and law. He was known to have been an outstanding student. He finally returned to Constantinople to obtain another law degree. He is also known as Sassoon Effendi (from Turkish Efendi, a title meaning Lord). (Arabic: ساسون حسقيل or ساسون حزقيال)

== Formative career ==
Following his education abroad and fluent in nine languages (English, Arabic, Turkish, Persian, Hebrew, French, German, Greek and Latin) Sassoon returned to Baghdad in 1881 where he was appointed Dragoman for the vilayet of Baghdad, in which post he remained until 1904. In 1885, he was also appointed Foreign Secretary to the Wali (Governor-General). On the announcement of the new Ottoman Constitution in 1908, he was elected deputy for Baghdad in the first Turkish Parliament, a position he occupied until the end of World War I, when Iraq was detached from the Ottoman Empire in 1918. In the Ottoman Parliament he worked as a member of various committees and organizations including the Committee of Union and Progress (the "Young Turks" party) and was Chairman of the Budget Committee. He was deputed to London and Paris on special missions, including as a member of an Ottoman delegation to London in 1909 as under-secretary of state for trade and agriculture. In 1913 he was appointed Advisor to the Ministry of Commerce and Agriculture.

Gertrude Margaret Lowthian Bell referred to him and his brother Shaoul in a letter to her father dated 14 June 1920, as follows:

"I'm making great friends with two Jews, brothers—one rather famous, as a member of the Committee of Union and Progress and a deputy for Baghdad. His name is Sasun Eff. The other Sha'al, (which is Saul) is the leading Jew merchant here. They have recently come back from C'ple [Istanbul (Constantinople)]—they were at the first tea party I gave for you, here. I've known Sha'al's wife and family a long time—they are very interesting and able men. Sasun, with his reputation and his intelligence, ought to be a great help".

Bell also wrote of Sassoon on 17 October 1920:

"That night Mr Philby dined with me and we had a long and profitable talk. He had been to tea with me also and I had Sasun Eff. to meet him which was most valuable, for Sasun is one of the sanest people here and he reviewed the whole position with his usual wisdom and moderation".

== Creation of Post WWI Iraq ==
In 1920, after the end of the First World War, Sassoon returned to Baghdad from Istanbul and was appointed Minister of Finance in the first Iraqi government, a new provisional government under the premiership of Abd al-Rahman al-Naqib. The importance of his role was what was to make or break the new constitution of Iraq. The details of this were highlighted by Gertrude Bell when she recounted the circumstances regarding the establishment of Iraq's new government.

To reach a final conclusion on the choice for ruler Winston Churchill, then British colonial secretary, summoned a small group of Orientalists to Egypt for the famous Cairo Conference of March 1921. The British Empire's best minds on the Middle East would determine the fate of Mesopotamia, Transjordan, and Palestine. Churchill's objectives were to save money by reducing Britain's overseas military presence; find a way to maintain political control over Britain's mandate areas as identified in the Sykes-Picot Agreement; protect what was then suspected to be substantial oil reserves in Iraq; and lastly preserve an open trade route to India, the Crown Jewel of the empire. Representing the Iraqis, two members of the council were picked to join the delegation: Sassoon Eskell and Ja'far Pasha al-Askari; with the disliked Talib al-Naqib left behind. It was at this conference, with Sassoon's and Ja'far Pasha's approval that Emir Faisal was chosen for the throne of Iraq.

== Ministerial office ==
Sassoon with King Faisal I and Menahem Saleh Daniel

When Faisal I was enthroned as King of Iraq, a new ministry was formed on 1 September 1921 by Prime Minister Abd al-Rahman al-Naqib in which Sassoon was re-appointed Minister of Finance. He was re-appointed Minister of Finance again in five successive governments until 1925 of Abd al-Rahman al-Naqib, Abd al-Muhsin al-Sa’dun and Yasin Pasha al-Hashimi.

Gertrude Bell described Sassoon's ministerial qualities in another letter dated 18 December 1920:

"The man I do love is Sasun Eff. and he is by far the ablest man in the Council. A little rigid, he takes the point of view of the constitutional lawyer and doesn't make quite enough allowance for the primitive conditions of the 'Iraq, but he is genuine and disinterested to the core. He has not only real ability but also wide experience and I feel touched and almost ashamed by the humility with which he seeks—and is guided by—my advice. It isn't my advice, really; I'm only echoing what Sir Percy thinks. But what I rejoice in and feel confident of is the solid friendship and esteem which exists between us. And in varying degrees I have the same feeling with them all. That's something, isn't it? that's a basis for carrying out the duties of a mandatory?”

And again in correspondence dated 7 February 1921:

"I do love Sasun Eff; I think he is out and away the best man we've got and I am proud and pleased that he should have made friends with me. He is an old Jew, enormously tall and very thin; he talks excellent English, reads all the English papers, and is entirely devoid of any self-interest. He has no wish to take any further part in public life but he says he is convinced that the future of his country—if it is to have a future—is bound up with the British mandate and as long as we say he can help us he is ready to put himself at our service. He made a very considerable name in the Turkish Chamber where he sat as a strong Committee man. Some day I mean to make him tell me all he really thought about the Committee. One can talk to him as man to man, and exchange genuine opinions"

During his period as Minister of Finance, Sassoon founded all the financial and budgeting structures and laws for the Kingdom and looked whole-heartedly after the interests of the monarchy and the proper fulfilment of its laws. Rather famously, one of his most financially prolific deeds for the State was during negotiations with the British Petroleum Company in 1925. Eskell demanded that Iraq's oil revenue be remunerated in gold rather than sterling; at the time, this request seemed bizarre since sterling was backed by the gold standard. Nevertheless, his demand was reluctantly accepted. This concession later benefited Iraq's treasury during World War II, when the gold standard was abandoned and sterling plummeted. He thus secured countless additional millions of Iraqi dinars for the State.

In 1925 he was elected deputy for Baghdad in the first parliament of the kingdom and was re-elected to all successive parliaments until his death. He served as chairman of the financial committee and during this time earned his reputation as Father of Parliament. He was connected and well acquainted with most major European statesmen of the time.

== Death ==
Eskell died in Paris, France, on 31 August 1932 while undergoing medical treatment. He was buried at the Père-Lachaise cemetery on Boulevard de Ménilmontant in Paris. On 7 September 1932, a commemorative service was held in Baghdad in his memory. Prime Minister Yasin Pasha Al-Hashimi published a eulogy in an Arabic daily newspaper in which he praised the late Eskell's character, culture, his outstanding personality, his vast knowledge, sense of duty and the proper fulfilment of that duty no matter how great the sacrifice was in time or in life. He said that the stupendous efforts which had been exerted by the deceased in regulating and establishing on a solid footing, the affairs of the Kingdom of Iraq during the mandatory regime, will be remembered by future generations.

All leading Arabic daily newspapers similarly eulogized the late Sassoon's character and achievements, saying that the services which had been rendered by the deceased for the welfare of his country will immortalize his great name, adding that his death was an irreparable loss to the nation.
