= Ba'ath Party archives =

The Ba'ath Party archives are a trove of archival documents relating to the history and governance of the Iraqi Ba'ath Party under the rule of Ahmed Hassan al-Bakr and Saddam Hussein from 1968 to 2003. U.S. officials seized the archives in the aftermath of the 2003 invasion of Iraq. The U.S. government completed its handover of the archive back to Iraq in 2020.

== U.S. seizure and custody ==
Soon after the 2003 invasion of Iraq, U.S. exploitation teams scoured Ba'ath Party offices for records that could shed light on Iraq's WMD programs and alleged support for global terrorism—though this effort was impeded by the widespread looting of the early post-invasion period. A U.S. defense contractor, the Iraq Memory Foundation (IMF), discovered and took possession of millions of pages of documents in the basement of the Ba'ath Party headquarters in Baghdad. The IMF encountered obstacles to their plans to create a national memorial to Saddam's victims of human rights abuses, so in 2005 they turned over the documents temporarily to the U.S. military. The documents were scanned for analysis by the U.S. Defense Intelligence Agency. In 2008, the IMF donated the materials to the Hoover Institution Library and Archives at Stanford University in California.

== Contents and research ==
The National Defense University in Washington, D.C., which owned digitized records of the archives, established the Conflict Records Research Center (CRRC) to enable academic research of the records. In 2011, the CRRC publicly released a small batch records, including notes from a meeting called by Saddam Hussein in reaction to the revelation of the Iran–Contra affair in 1986 and strategy deliberations from the early days of the Iran–Iraq War. The CRRC also owned thousands of hours of Saddam's secretly recorded meetings and conversations. The CRRC closed in 2015 when the Defense Department cut its funding.

The Hoover Institution's archive included 11 million records and was used by researchers on the Ba'ath Party's governance, repression of dissent, use of religion in the state, and demographic policies. About 3.8 million records consisted of the party's membership files.

== Controversy and return to Iraq ==
Iraqi cultural scholars argued the seizures of the Ba'ath archives constituted an imperialistic theft of Iraq's heritage. In 2008, the Society of American Archivists and Association of Canadian Archivists jointly issued a statement calling for the return of the Ba'ath archive and other Iraqi documents. Although the 1907 Hague Convention permits conquering countries to seize the records of enemy states, the archivist groups argued that the Hague Convention did not apply to the Iraq Memory Foundation as a private organization. The IMF argued in response that Iraqi national institutions would need to exercise extreme caution handling the documents, as many of them named victims of Saddam's abusive regime. In 2010, Saad Eskander, head of the Iraq National Library and Archive, formally requested that Stanford return their document archive; the university declined, citing the unstable security situation in Iraq at the time.

Motivated in part by cost-saving concerns, the U.S. Defense Department returned a tranche of 120 million documents in May 2013. A final batch of 6 million pages was delivered in August 2020.
