= Shareen Blair Brysac =

American writer

- Spouse: Karl E. Meyer
- Writing career
- Notable awards: Five Emmys, DuPont Citation, George Foster Peabody Award, Writers Guild Award, medals from New York and Chicago film festivals

Shareen Blair Brysac is an author of non-fiction books and a former dancer, television producer/director/writer.

== Biography ==
Brysac was born in Denver, Colorado, and graduated from Barnard College, Columbia University. While at Barnard, she briefly attended the Juilliard School and danced as a member of the José Limón and Merce Cunningham Companies. After her graduation, she also appeared with the Paul Taylor Dance Company and with the New York City Opera ballet.

In 1974 she began working for CBS News as a producer/director of documentaries for the network. Her documentaries 1968, American Dream, American Nightmare, The Cowboy, the Craftsman, and the Ballerina, and Juilliard and Beyond: A Life in Music, Once in Lifetime won five Emmys, a DuPont Citation, a George Foster Peabody Award, a Writers Guild Award, medals from New York and Chicago film festivals, and a special invitation to the Edinburgh Film Festival.

From 1985 to 1987 she was first program manager for CUNY TV, the cable television station for the City University of New York and subsequently she was a member of the Media Faculty of the Borough of Manhattan Community College. In 1989, she founded and directed the Campus Programming Service designed to bring foreign programming to university television stations, for which she received a Rockefeller Grant.

Brysac is a past member of the American Guild of Musical Artists, the Directors Guild, the Writers Guild, the United Federation of Teachers, the Authors Guild, and Women in Film.

== Writing ==
In 1999, she was the co-author with her husband, Karl E. Meyer, of Tournament of Shadows: the Great Game and the Race for Empire in Central Asia. It was chosen as a Notable Book of the Year by The New York Times and was a finalist for the Lionel Gelber Prize for "the world's best non-fiction book in English that seeks to deepen public debate on significant global issues." It was republished with a new introduction in 2006 by Basic Books.

Her biography, Resisting Hitler: Mildred Harnack and the Red Orchestra was one of three finalists for the Los Angeles Times Biography Book of the Year and the German edition of the book published by Scherz Verlag was selected as one of the best books of the year by German reviewers.

Kingmakers: the Invention of the Modern Middle East appeared in 2008. Written together with her husband, it was chosen as one of the best books of the year by The Washington Post. Excerpts appeared in Harper's Magazine and the World Policy Journal. Her expanded chapter on Gertrude Bell was selected to appear in Ultimate Adventures with Britannia.

Meyer and Brysac's book entitled Pax Ethnica: Where and Why Diversity Succeeds received support from the Gould, Carnegie, and Pulitzer Foundations. I It was a finalist for the Dayton Peace Prize.

The China Collectors: America's Century-Long Hunt for Asian Art Treasures (2014) named one of the Washington Post's Books of the Year.

Brysac has also been a contributing editor to Archaeology magazine and a frequent contributor to Military History Quarterly. Her articles have also appeared in The New York Times, The Herald Tribune, The Washington Post, World Policy Journal and The Nation.

During the fall term Michaelmas 2012, she was in residence as a senior associate member of St. Antony's College, Oxford.

== Television and lecture appearances ==
Brysac's television appearances include Dance in America (PBS), WISC, WNYC, CNN and three hours on C-SPAN’s Book Talk.

She has lectured at universities and local libraries including the National Archives, the Library of Congress, the British Museum, the Newark Museum, the Explorer's Club, the Royal Asiatic Society (London), Gedenkstätte Deutscher Widerstand (Berlin), Maschinenbau (Essen), the National Arts Club, English Speaker's Union, Prologue Clubs (Florida), German Information Center (New York), Asia Society (Houston), New York Society Library, Boston's Museum of Fine Arts, and the German Cultural Foundation (Philadelphia).

== Filmography ==
- A Conversation with Eric Sevareid, CBS, 1977
- 1968, CBS, 1978
- American Dream, American Nightmare, CBS, 1979
- Pablo Picasso: Once in a Lifetime with the Museum of Modern Art, CBS, 1981
- The Cowboy, the Craftsman and the Ballerina, CBS, 1981
- Juilliard: a Life in Music, CBS, 1982

== Bibliography ==
- 1999: Meyer, Karl E. and Shareen Blair Brysac. Tournament of Shadows: The Great Game and the Race for Empire in Central Asia. Washington, D.C.: Counterpoint
- 2000: Brysac, Shareen Blair. Resisting Hitler: Mildred Harnack and the Red Orchestra. New York: Oxford University Press
- 2007: Meyer, Karl E. and Shareen Blair Brysac. Kingmakers: the Invention of the Modern Middle East. New York: Norton
- 2012: Meyer, Karl E. and Shareen Blair Brysac. Pax Ethnica: Where and How Diversity Succeeds. New York: PublicAffairs
- 2014: Meyer, Karl E. and Shareen Blair Brysac. The China Collectors: America's Century Long Hunt for Asian Art Treasures. New York: Palgrave Macmillan
