= Talib al-Naqib =

Iraqi politician

Talib Al-Naqib
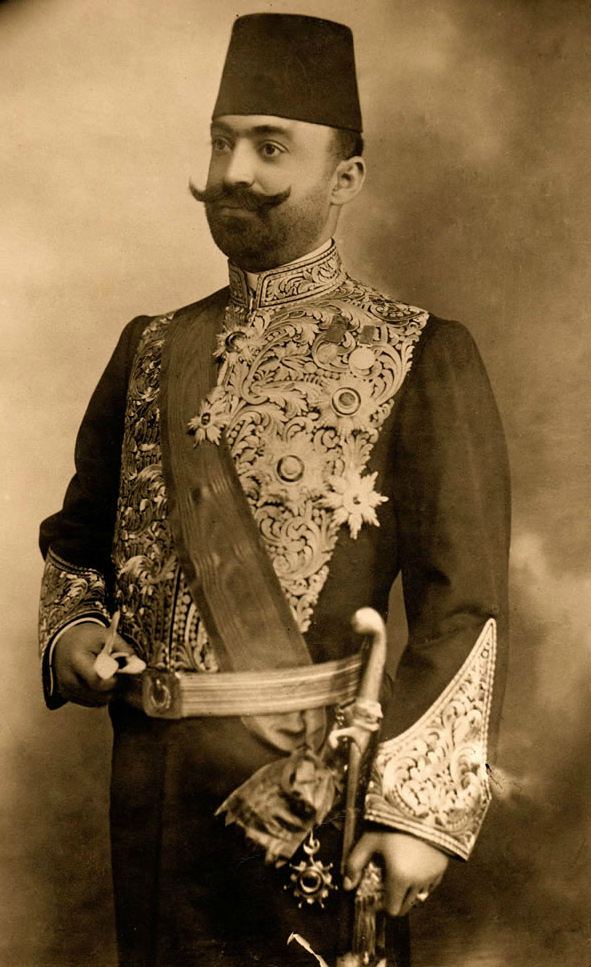

1st Minister of Interior
- In office 11 November 1920 – 23 August 1921
- Prime Minister: Abd Al-Rahman Al-Gillani
- Preceded by: New office
- Succeeded by: Ramzi Bey

Vali of the Basra Vilayet
- In office 1913–1913
- Preceded by: Riza Pasha
- Succeeded by: Izzat Pasha

Ottoman Representative
- In office December 1908 – November 1914

Governor of al-Hasa
- In office 1901–1903
- Preceded by: Mousa Kadhim Pasha

Personal details
- Born: 28 February 1862 Basra, Ottoman Empire
- Died: 16 June 1929 (aged 67) Munich, Germany
- Party: Free and Neutral Party; Freedom and Coalition Party

Talib Pasha bin Rajab Al-Naqib Al-Refa'i (Arabic: طالب باشا بن رجب النقيب الرفاعي) was an Iraqi politician, who became the first Minister of Interior in Iraq.

== Family ==
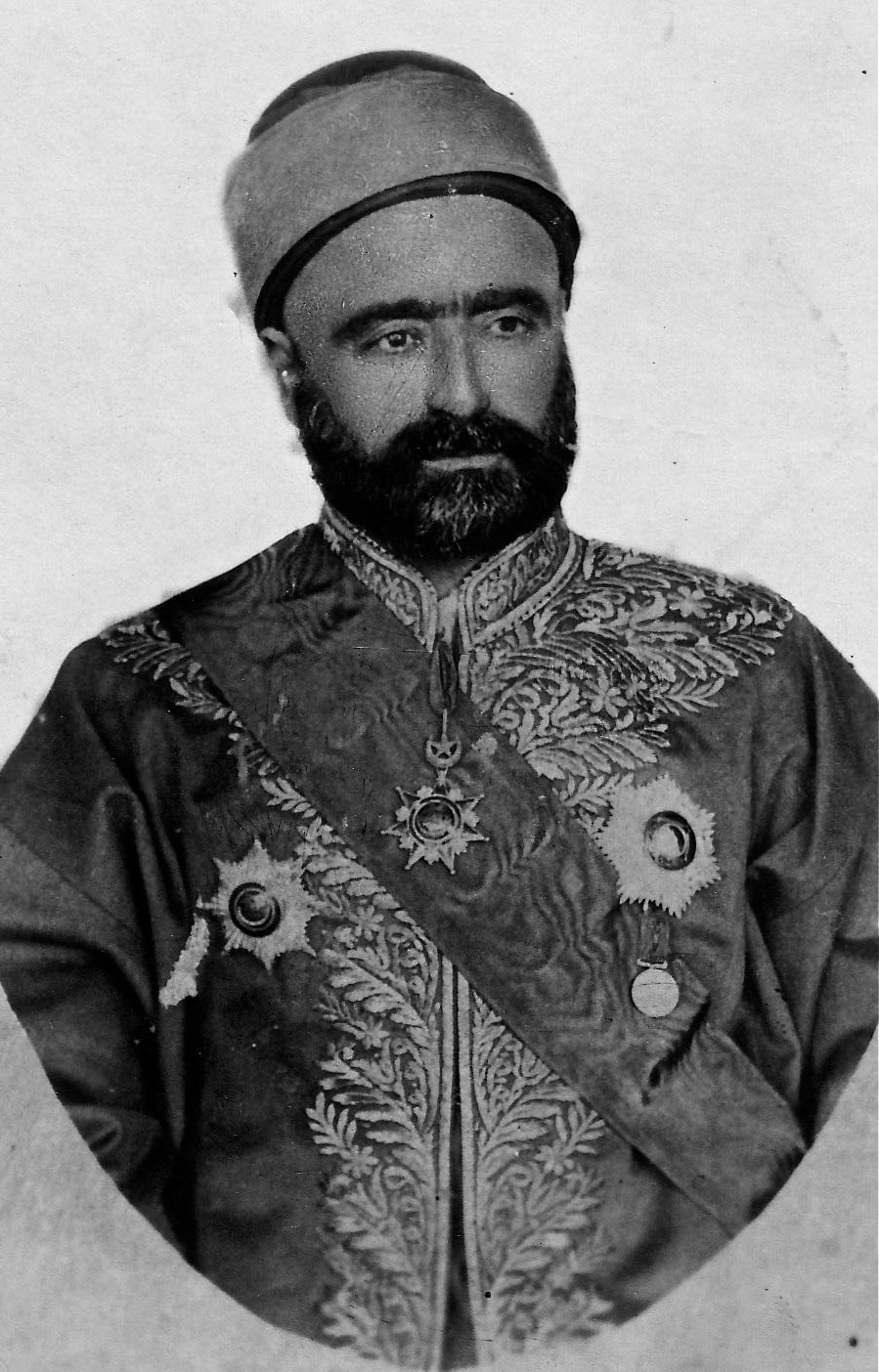
Rajab al-Naqib.

He was a descendant of Husayn ibn Ali, a grandson of Muhammad The al-Naqib family comes from the city of Mandali, where Talib (the great-grandfather) emigrated with his two sons, Muhammad Sa'eed and Abdul Rahman, to Basra between 1811 and 1814. Other sources say that they lived in Mecca, but the Abbasid Caliph, Al-Qa'im Bi-Amrillah, brought them to be the Sheikhs of Nobles of Basra.

After the death of Talib his son Abdul Rahman inherited the sheikdom in 1874 and then, Muhammad Sa'eed, who became the vice-chairman of the properties of Sultan Abdul Hamid II. When Muhammad Sa'eed got old, he made his son, Rajab, the vice-chairman of the sultan's properties. After the death of Muhammad Sa'eed in 1896, Rajab became the Sheikh of Nobles. He intimidated the Valis of Basra. People called him Robin Hood.

Most of the al-Naqib family moved to Kuwait around 1900 and became famous there.

== Early life ==
In 1899, Rajab sent his son, Talib, to Istanbul, to solve the problems between the first ruler of Kuwait, Mubarak Al-Sabah and the Vali of Basra, Hamdi Pasha, about the 1899 treaty between the United Kingdom and Kuwait, and he succeeded. After that, Hamdi Pasha was deposed, replacing him with Muhsin Pasha. Talib also solved the problem between the Sheikh of Mohammerah, Khaz'al al-Ka'bi and the Ottoman Empire, about Khaz'al's properties in Basra. He donated some of his money to the Ottomans during their conflicts with the Principality of Bulgaria, and for that, he was given the special rank of Mermaran, by Sultan Abdul Hamid II, in 1895.

== Governor of Al-Hasa ==
In 1901, al-Naqib was set as the governor of al-Hasa in Najd, after the tribe of Banu Hajar attacked a governmental caravan and stole a value of a million rupees from it; because the leaders of the tribe requested their salary, but the government didn't reply to them. al-Naqib ordered to raid a military camp of Al Murrah, who were responsible for the caravan attack, and took away their money and animals and put it on sale in Al Hufuf and finally, he ordered the other tribes to cut their deals with them, so the other tribes could take them as an example. He accomplished his mission of suppressing the tribal movements and restore peace and was given the special rank of Bala.

In 1903, Mansour bin Jum'a al-Kawakibi, a merchant from Al-Qatif, sent a letter to Sultan Abdul Hamid II, telling him about what happened between him and al-Naqib:

After he became the governor of al-Hasa, Talib al-Naqib started to wipe Ibn Jum'a out, because he didn't give al-Naqib what he wanted, which is a bribe, and because he was a strong competitor to al-Naqib's friend, Mubarak Al-Sabah, in pearl trading. He mentions that he presented hundreds of complaints about Talib al-Naqib and his policies, but no orders came from the Sultan. Some of al-Naqib's works that Ibn Jum'a reported were: Al-Naqib became the sheikh of nobles in Basra by dealing with bribes and giving them to Abu Hadi al-Sayyadi, which had the trust of the Sultan, he ordered 10k rupees from Ibn Jum'a in order to give it to al-Sayyadi, stirring up the problems in Al-Hasa, so he could suppress them and impress the government, having a big role in putting Kuwait under the British protection, because he was the mastermind behind al-Sabah's works.

— Mansour ibn Jum'a al-Kawakibi, Ottoman Archives

After a few days, al-Naqib was sacked from his job.

== Ottoman politician ==
In 1903, al-Naqib returned to Istanbul to work in the civil department of the state consultative council until restoring the constitutional monarchy. He was elected in the first term, in the 1908 Ottoman general election, as a representative of Basra in the Ottoman Parliament, before re-electing him in the 1912 elections and the 1914 elections.

In 1909, he created the Free And Neutral Party. He, with the cooperation of Khaz'al al-Ka'bi and Mubarak Al-Sabah, also created a branch of the Freedom and Coalition Party in Basra, on August 6, 1911. The Constitution newspaper was the speaker of the party, which published its first issue on January 9, 1912. In the 1912 elections, the Freedom and Coalition party won two seats in the parliament. Because of the decentralized governance in the Ottoman Empire, after they clashed with the Arab political and cultural assemblies, al-Naqib canceled his party's branch in Basra, Because of his Arab nationalism beliefs. Ottomans tried to assassinate him via Fareed Bey and Nouri Bey, but al-Naqib prepared a number of armed insurgents that killed them first.

He created the Reformist Assembly of Basra, which called for creating local councils for the Arab Vilayets, including the Basra Vilayet. Ottomans wanted to keep him away from politics, so, he was made the Vali of Basra in 1913, for a very short period. In the 1914 elections, al-Naqib increased his party's seats in the parliament by four, having 6 seats, which made him more confident to demand the rights of the Arabs.

== British mandate ==
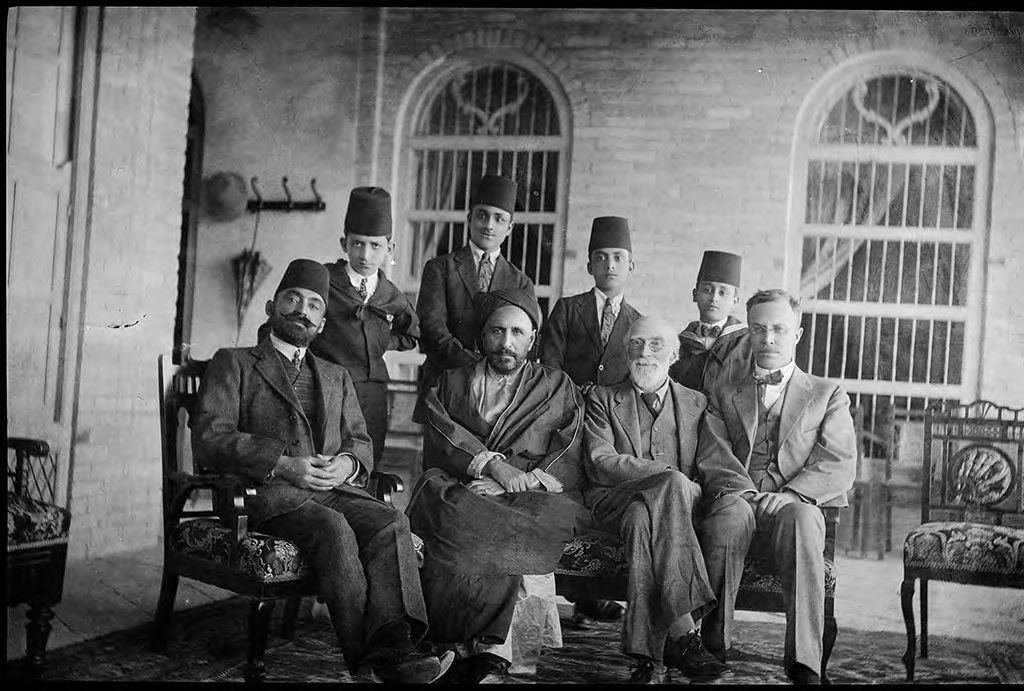
Shaikh Khaz'al al-Ka'bi Emir of Arabistan (middle), Hugh Bell Mayor of Middlesbrough (right), and al-Naqib (left), in 1920.

When the British troops arrived at Basra, in 1914, al-Naqib was captured and exiled to Bombay (Mumbai); because of his objection on the British occupation. He stayed in his exile for five years, before coming back to Iraq and witnessing the 1920 Iraqi revolt. He didn't approve of the revolt; because he believed that political situations should be solved by peaceful solutions. He also believed that the best solution is to occupy Iraq into Vilayets, just like the Ottomans did.

He was hoping to rule Basra or to rule Iraq. Therefore, he was against Faisal I, being the King of Iraq, with Khaz'al al-Ka'bi and Arnold Wilson supporting al-Naqib. But his fame decreased when Percy Cox became the British high commissioner of Iraq. al-Naqib was appointed as the minister of interior in Abd Al-Rahman Al-Gillani's acting government, but al-Naqib refused the office; because he thought that such secondary office would degrade his dignity, but he was convinced by Gertrude Bell and St John Philby as long as he would be the second man, after Al-Gillani.

When al-Naqib wasn't invited to the Cairo Conference, in 1921, he objected and threatened to make a rebellion, cooperating with the tribal leaders. So, he made a campaign tour in southern Iraq and the middle Euphrates region. He made a banquet, celebrating Perceval Landon with some tribal leaders. He stood in the banquet and said: "We don't like the people in the house of the mandate, because they are interfering in the nation's matters, which its people have the only right to order and own anything they want in it." This statement was copied from a person who attended the banquet, called Tod, to the secretary of the British accreditation house in Iraq, Gertrude Bell. Bell checked the facts with foreign dignitaries, present at the event, and told Sir Cox about it, which led Lady Cox to invite al-Naqib for tea, on 16 April 1921. As he left Sir Percy had him arrested and exiled him to Ceylon. St John Philby was set as the new minister of interior. After returning from exile, al-Naqib decided to retire from political work and avoid meeting any governmental person. He refused to meet King Faisal when he wanted to visit him, but after some interference, they met in 1925, and cleared the problems between them.

== Death ==
Al-Naqib had health problems and traveled to Munich for surgery, during which he died on July 16, 1929.

== See also ==
- Ottoman Empire
- Basra Vilayet
- Kingdom of Iraq (British administration)

Political offices
Preceded by New Office; Great Iraqi Revolution	Minister of Interior; 11 November 1920 — 23 August 1921	Succeeded by St John Philby
