= Georgina Howell =

British journalist and author

- Born: 8 May 1942; Kimberley, South Africa
- Died: 21 January 2016 (aged 73); Brittany, France
- Education: London School of Secretaries
- Occupations: Author and fashion journalist

Georgina Howell (8 May 1942 – 21 January 2016) was a British journalist and author who began in fashion journalism, but broadened her subject range as her career progressed.

== Early life ==
Howell was born in Kimberley, South Africa on 8 May 1942. An only child, she was the daughter of Gwen (née Darrington) and William "Bill" Howell; her father was a Royal Air Force (RAF) flying instructor. In 1944, her father returned to London (Howell and her mother followed in a convoy in dangerous circumstances) as he had been assigned to work with Bomber Command; the family lived in other parts of Britain and Penang (now in Malaysia) for periods. Following several unsatisfactory convent schools (Howell was, in fact, raised as a Protestant), she attended Miss Ironside’s School, a "dame" school in Kensington (run by the great-aunt of journalist Virginia Ironside). When she was aged 14, her father died from a heart attack following a plane accident.

== Career ==
Persuaded by her mother, Howell entered Vogue's Young Talent contest in 1960. She won, ensuing she gained a job at Condé Nast (Vogue's parent company), assisting Peter Coats, garden editor of House and Garden. She was soon switched to the Vogue copy department at the suggestion of Bea Miller coming up with slogans for captions such as "Vogue Patterns: Cottoning on to Summer". She also coined the maxim "Buy nothing until you buy Vogue", which is still used for promoting Vogue. Miller promoted her to features editor.

At the age of 24, she was appointed as the fashion designer of The Observer. Soon she became a featured editor and interviewer for different American and British magazines. She assisted in styling the photo sessions of David Bailey, Norman Parkinson, and the Earl of Snowdon, sometimes standing in for Jean Shrimpton when she had rowed with Bailey.

Howell was commissioned by Bea Miller to assemble the book Vogue: Six Decades of Fashion which was first published in 1975 (new edition In Vogue: 75 Years of Style, 1991). In order to assemble the book, Howell organised Vogue's then disorganised library and created the archive which remains in use. In 1979, on the eve of the publication of Joan Didion's essay collection The White Album, British Vogue sent her to the United States to interview Didion. After Tina Brown became the editor of Tatler in 1979, she appointed Howell as her deputy.

As a magazine profile writer for American Vogue, Vanity Fair, The Sunday Times Magazine and The Mail on Sunday, Howell wrote about film stars, rock bands, and the members of the Royal family. Among others, Howell interviewed Bianca Jagger; U2; Diana, Princess of Wales; Anne, Princess Royal; Ronald Reagan; Clint Eastwood; Bruce Oldfield; Giorgio Armani; Karl Lagerfeld; Guns N' Roses; Valentino; James Galway; Frederick Ashton; Sylvie Guillem; and Alec Guinness. She became a friend of Elizabeth Taylor after bringing her a kilo of sausages from England.

Howell's biography of Gertrude Bell, entitled Queen of the Desert was first published in 2007 (originally Daughter of the Desert in the UK). In 2015 the book was turned to a film directed by Werner Herzog and starring Nicole Kidman.

== Private life ==
In 1963, Howell married Michael Buhler, an artist. She divorced her husband in 1978 gaining custody of their son, Tom (born 1967). He has worked for the marketing department of Yale University Press.

In 1990, she married Christopher Bailey, a former bursar of the Royal Agricultural College, whom she met while researching a piece on the college for The Sunday Times. The couple bought a 1,000 year old manor in Brittany, near St. Malo, which they restored. Howell died in Brittany at the age of 73, on 21 January 2016, after suffering from cancer for four years.
