= Iraq National Library and Archive =

National library of Iraq

Coordinates: 33°20′47.19″N 44°23′4.34″E

- دار الكتب والوثائق
- Iraq National Library burned down after 2003 arson
- Location: Baghdad, Iraq, Iraq
- Type: Public, National library
- Established: 1920 (106 years ago)

Other information
- Director: Alaa Abu Al Hassan Ismail
- Website: www.iraqnla.gov.iq

The Iraq National Library and Archive (INLA; Arabic: دار الكتب والوثائق العراقية, Dār al-Kutub wa al-Wathā'iq al-'Irāqiyyah) is the national library and national archives of Iraq. It is located in the Iraqi capital of Baghdad and was founded in 1920. It has often been affected by losses resulting from warfares.

== History ==
The origins of the National Library lie in the foundation of the Baghdad Peace Library, the Maktabat al-Salam, sometimes called the General Library, which was established in Baghdad in 1920, on the initiative of Muriel Jesse Forbes, with the assistance of Gertrude Bell, then Oriental Secretary to the British High Commissioner. Initially it was a private, subscription library, supported by donated money and books. A Catholic priest and school teacher in a monastery in Baghdad, Anastase-Marie al-Karmali (1866–1947) became the first librarian of the Al Salam library. Bell devoted some of her time and energy to the management committee and to fund-raising for the Library, but it struggled financially and in 1923 discussions about transferring it to the government commenced. The Library was taken over by or given to the Ministry of Education in 1924 and, in 1929, its collection of 4,283 books was shifted to the al-Mamooria school where it was renamed as al-Maktabat al-Aammat or the Public Library.

In the early 1950s, the Baghdad Public Library was situated on Imam al-Adham Street at the north-west corner of the present day Bab al-Mu'azzam Square, where the North Gate of the old walled city used to stand. By that time, it was being referred to informally as the "National Library". Some discussions between the Iraqi authorities and the British Embassy about a possible exchange of land as a site for a National Library, and with the British Council about the design of the building, were terminated by the 1958 Revolution. Subsequently the new government designated the former Baghdad Public Library as the National Library by a Law (No. 51) passed in 1961.

Although archival collections had accumulated over the centuries, there appears to have been no organisation responsible for them in recent times until action was taken by the University of Baghdad, following a study carried out by an ad hoc committee in 1963. Legislation was passed in 1963 and the National Documents Centre was established by the university in 1964 to collect and conserve official documents. Responsibility for the Centre remained with the university until 1969, when further legislation established the status, aims and objectives of the renamed National Record Office, which became the responsibility of the Ministry of Culture and Information.

By the early 1970s, the National Library building was overcrowded, but it was 1977 before it finally moved into a new purpose-built building. However, the original intentions were frustrated when the government allocated a complete floor to the National Record Office or, as it came to be called, the National Centre for Archives. The National Library and the National Centre for Archives were formally amalgamated in 1987.

As Saddam Hussein came into power in 1979, the INLA began to weaken. One of the causes came from Hussein directing the country's money towards the Iran–Iraq War (1980–1989). "Political appointees and Ba'ath loyalists directed the INLA under Saddam Hussein, and a budget freeze in 1980 ended all new material acquisitions for the remaining years of Saddam's regime". Through the next two decades, many of the notable institutions of Iraq, including INLA, continued to falter, especially in the wake of the 2003 Iraq war.

=== Iraq War ===
"In April of 2003, the National Library and Archives (Dar al-Kutub wa al-Watha'Iq), which was located directly across from the Ministry of Defense, had been burned and looted". The burning and looting appeared to have taken place on two occasions: April 10 and April 12–13. These fires were set professionally with accelerants. A report was later given by Saad Eskander, the director–general of the National Library and Archive, regarding the destruction. He noted that three days before the invasion, library staff were told to destroy all archival material related to the Ba'athist rule. Eskander also reported that the destruction was performed by "a mix of poor people looking for a quick profit, along with regime loyalists intent on destroying evidence of atrocities".

American archeologists and academics warned the US military of the location and importance of protecting Iraq's museums and libraries. However, during the occupation of Baghdad the American military forces placed hundreds of troops at 2 main locations in Baghdad—The Ministry of Interior and The Ministry of Oil; neglecting Iraq's museums, libraries and other institutions. It was noted that US troops were positioned right across the road from the library in the Ministry of Defense but orders were withheld to intervene with troops replying "we are soldiers, not policemen," when requested to help.

Due to an iron door having been locked, most of the damage occurred in the main reading room and lobby of the building. "After the first round of destruction, staff and volunteers associated with a cleric named `Abd al-Mun'im welded the door shut and removed as many books as they could transport to the cleric's al-Haqq Mosque in Sadr (formerly Saddam) City." In total, an estimated 60 percent of its total archival materials, 25 percent of its books, newspapers, rare books, and most of its historical photographs and maps were destroyed. Included in the rare volumes and documents lost was one of the oldest copies of the Quran.

Before the destruction, the library and archives were reported to have held 417,000 books, 2,618 periodicals dating from the late Ottoman era to modern times, and a collection of 4,412 rare books and manuscripts. "According to Eskander, Saddam loyalists burned the entirety of the Republican Archive, which contained the records of the Ba'athist regime between the years 1958 and 1979. Also completely destroyed were the Ba'athist court proceedings detailing the charges against and trials of party opponents. Records of Iraq's relations with its neighbors, including Iran, Syria, Jordan, and Saudi Arabia, are missing. Iraq has accused neighbouring countries of stealing sections of its national archives. In addition to these documents, which would have been of great interest to Iraqi citizens as well as to historians, the INLA lost records and documents from the Ottoman reign, the British occupation, the monarchical era, and much more. The destruction or loss of these materials, according to Eskander, did not occur only during the April 2003 attacks".

In November 2003, the U.S. Library of Congress sent a team to Baghdad that, among other things, also visited the library in its fire damaged state. They entered the building and visited the stacks of the library, which were hidden behind a metal door.

=== Restoration and philosophy ===
Saad Eskander, director of the library and archives since 2003 to 2015, has been keeping a diary through the British Library's website, with entries starting in November 2006. His entries document the events covering the library and archive's restoration. By 2007, the center "had already become a safe haven for intellectual activity, fully accessible to the public, with a state-of-the-art computer center". In addition, there is also a facility for transferring documents to microfilm, a cataloging operation, and a department that locates documents from Iraqi government ministries. Having been a major player in the history of Iraq, the British Library was able to help the reconstruction, by providing microfilm copies of rare books and microfiche copies of documents relating to the administration of Iraq from 1914 to 1921 that were held by the British in India. Despite the fact that five staff members have been killed, along with the library closing for days at a time due to heavy fighting, Eskander says he sees the institution as "an important source of uniting and unifying the country." In another interview in 2008, Eskander expanded on this theme. "Culture is important, especially secular culture and especially an institution that documents the cultural and scientific achievements of a nation. The country was on the verge of dismemberment and institutions like us and like the Iraqi Museum (National Museum of Iraq) could play a role in the fact that they provide common symbols to all Iraqis. We are not a sectarian institution; we are a national institution."

Almost five years later, in 2012, Eskander reflected again on the critical importance of cultural institutions, and stated "Primary, intermediate, and high school libraries have not been functioning throughout the course of the war. Policymakers still think that they will win the war against terrorism by the mere use of force, not through spreading humanistic and tolerant cultural values. Our experience proves that progressive culture is vital to the winning of the war against terrorism. Libraries, archives, and museums have a role to play in the formation of true national identity; an identity transcends religious, regional, and ethnic boundaries. A clear-cut and inclusive national identity is what Iraq has been lacking since the British left their mark on the country after World War I. Unfortunately, no importance is attached to the role that the library can play in an emerging young democracy, or in a country where its social fabric is disintegrating rapidly." Yet, in the same article, Eskander mentions that "the library is the only national institution that is always willing to assist, unconditionally, other educational or cultural organizations. We have built a good reputation throughout Iraq. We have representatives in every province whose task is to work closely with provincial cultural and educational institutions."

== See also ==
- Destruction of libraries
