= Saad Eskander =

Iraqi Kurdish academic and researcher

Saad Eskander (Arabic: سعد اسکندر; born 1962) is a contemporary Iraqi Kurdish academic and researcher. He was born in Baghdad, joined the Kurdish Peshmerga in 1981 and lived in the mountains of Iraqi Kurdistan for four years, then moved to Iran and Syria.

He received his B.A. in modern history from the University of North London and his PhD in international relations and history from the London School of Economics. His thesis was titled Britain's Policy Towards the Kurdish Question, 1915–1923. He returned to Iraq in 2003 after the invasion and since then has served as the director of the Iraq National Library and Archive until 2015. As of 2023, Eskander was serving in two roles: Cultural Heritage Advisor to the Ministry of Culture, Tourism and Antiquities, and as the Technical Supervisor of the Iraq National Archive.

During the height of civil war in Iraq, he wrote a blog diary about the harrowing experience of living in Baghdad, which was subsequently published on the British Library's website. The diary was written between November 2006 and July 2007.

== Awards and honours ==
He was awarded Archivist of the Year Award by New York's Scone Foundation at a ceremony at Columbia University in New York on 12 November 2007. He also won the MESA Academic Freedom Award of the Middle East Studies Association in 2007.

He was awarded Honorary Fellowship of the Chartered Institute of Library and Information Professionals (CILIP) in recognition of his distinguished service at a ceremony hosted at the British Library in December 2008.

In 2010, Dr. Eskander was elected as Iraq's representative at the UNESCO Intergovernmental Committee for promoting the Return of Cultural Property to the Country of their Origins.

== See also ==
- Ba'ath Party archives
