= Karl E. Meyer =

American journalist (1928–2019)

Karl E. Meyer (May 22, 1928 – December 22, 2019) was an American-based journalist.

He was the third generation of his family to be engaged in that occupation, as his grandfather, George Meyer, was the editor of the leading German language newspaper in Milwaukee, the Germania. His father, Ernest L. Meyer, was a columnist for The Capital Times in Madison, Wisconsin. and then the New York Post. In 1979, he joined The New York Times as the senior writer for foreign affairs, a position he held until his retirement in 1998.

== Early life and education ==
Meyer was born in Madison, Wisconsin. His career in journalism began while as an undergraduate at the University of Wisconsin-Madison. During his junior year, he became the editor of The Daily Cardinal, the student newspaper, while serving as the campus correspondent of the Milwaukee Journal. During his senior year, he edited the university literary magazine, The Athenaean. He received his MPA (Master of Public Affairs) from the Woodrow Wilson School of Public and International Affairs at Princeton University. After being awarded a Proctor Fellowship, he earned a Ph.D. (in politics), also from Princeton University.

== Career ==
After graduation in 1956, Meyer's career in foreign affairs began for The Washington Post. He also wrote a weekly column from America for the New Statesman. He won an Overseas Press Club award for his coverage of Latin America, and during the Cuban revolution he interviewed Fidel Castro in the Sierra Maestra. From 1965 to 1970, he was the Post's London bureau chief where he became a weekly regular on the BBC and a character in the humor magazine Private Eye. In 1968, he covered the Soviet invasion and occupation of Czechoslovakia. Returning home in 1970, he headed the Post's New York bureau.

Meyer was a television columnist and contributing editor of The Saturday Review from 1975 to 1979 and a contributing editor of Archaeology from 1999 to 2005. He joined The New York Times editorial board in 1979, where he served until 1998 as the senior writer on foreign affairs and was a frequent contributor to the "Arts and Ideas" section. He was a member of the Peabody Awards Board of Jurors from 1977 to 1983. After his retirement from the Times, Meyer became editor of the World Policy Journal, published quarterly by the World Policy Institute, a position he held until 2008, when he became editor emeritus.

Meyer was a visiting professor at Yale University, Tufts University's Fletcher School, Bard College, and the McGraw Professor of Writing at Princeton. He was a senior associate member of St. Antony's College, Oxford, and fellow of Green College, Oxford University, the Wissenschaftskolleg zu Berlin, and Davenport College, Yale. He served as judge for the Peabodys, the Pulitzer Prize, and the Arnold Toynbee History Prize. He was also a member of the Council on Foreign Relations and the Century Association.

== Works ==
- with Shareen Blair Brysac.The China Collectors: America's Century-Long Hunt for Asian Art Treasures. New York: St Martin's Press, 2015.
- with Shareen Blair Brysac. Pax Ethnica: Where and How Diversity Succeeds. New York: Public Affairs, 2012.
- with Shareen Blair Brysac. Kingmakers: The Invention of the Modern Middle East. New York: Norton, 2008.
- The Dust of Empire: The Race for Mastery in the Asian Heartland. New York: Public Affairs, 2003.
- with Shareen Blair Brysac. Tournament of Shadows: The Race for Empire in Central Asia. Washington, DC: Counterpoint, 1999.
- Pundits, Poets and Wits: An Omnibus of American Newspaper Columns. New York: Oxford University Press, 1990.
- The Art Museum: Power, Money, Ethics: a Twentieth Century Fund Report. New York: Morrow, 1979.
- Teotihuacan. New York: Newsweek, 1973. ISBN 978-0-88225-084-7.
- The Plundered Past. New York: Atheneum, 1973.
- The Pleasures of Archaeology: A Visa to Yesterday. New York: Atheneum, 1970.
- Fulbright of Arkansas: The Public Positions of a Private Thinker. Washington, DC: R. B. Luce, 1963.
- with Tad Szulc. The Cuban Invasion: The Chronicle of a Disaster. New York: Praeger, 1962.
- The New America: Politics and Society in the Age of the Smooth Deal. New York: Basic Books, 1961.

== Personal life ==
Meyer married Shareen Blair Brysac, with whom he co-authored four books. He had two sons and a daughter.
