= Abd Al-Rahman Al-Gillani =

Prime minister of Iraq from 1920 to 1922

Abd Al-Rahman Al-Gailani
- عبد الرحمن الگيلاني
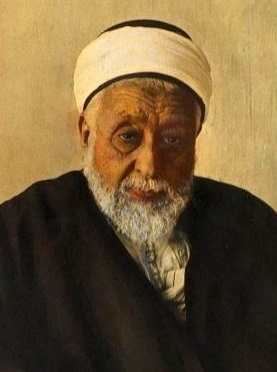

1st Prime Minister of Mandatory Iraq
- In office 11 November 1920 – 20 November 1922
- Monarch: Faisal I
- Preceded by: Position established
- Succeeded by: Abd al-Muhsin as-Sa'dun

Personal details
- Born: 11 January 1841 Baghdad, Ottoman Iraq
- Died: 13 June 1927 (aged 86) Baghdad, Kingdom of Iraq
- Resting place: Hadhrat al-Qadiriyya, Baghdad, Iraq

Qutb-ul Aqtaab Naqib Al Ashraaf Syed Abd ar-Rahman al-Qadri al-Gillani (Arabic: عبد الرحمن الكيلاني النقيب; 11 January 1841 – 13 June 1927) was an Iraqi politician who served as the first prime minister of Iraq from 1920 to 1922. He was an important figure during the Ottoman and British Mandate eras of Iraq, and he had an important role in Iraqi politics.

== Early life ==
Al-Gillani was born in Baghdad to a Sufi family. Al-Gillani was a descendant of Abdul Qadir al-Gillani. His family has been known since ancient times for its scientific significance and councilmen and was known for his morality and love for his people. He was the Shaykh of the Banu Hashim clan of the Quraysh tribe in Baghdad. He lived most of his life as an Ottoman and studied under Sultan Abdul Hamid II who strongly supported him on the issue of Palestine when he was young.

== Political career ==
Al-Gillani was chosen in 1920 to head the Iraqi Council of Ministers following the dissolution of the Ottoman Empire. Due to his good relations with the British and his personality, he was one of the candidates for the throne of Iraq. He refused to take the title out of renunciation of the King but agreed to be prime minister. He used his influence to oppose the appointment of Faisal I as King of Iraq and resigned from his post when his efforts were defeated. Nevertheless, Faisal still reappointed him as prime minister in order to curb opposition. Even though Al-Gillani was reinstated, his powers were greatly diminished as the king and the British took more prominent roles in appointing ministers and other government officials.

In 1922, al-Gillani negotiated the first Anglo-Iraqi Treaty, which ensured nominal independence for the country, though Britain maintained control of the military and foreign affairs, essentially establishing a Mandate in the country. Opposed to these results, al-Gillani resigned shortly after and spent the rest of his life in seclusion.

== Death and burial ==
Al-Gillani died on 13 June 1927 in Baghdad, aged 86. His funeral was attended by many high figures within Iraq including Prince Ghazi, who would later become the King of Iraq in 1933. He was buried inside the Hadhrat al-Qadiriyya.

One of his sons was named Syed Mahmood Hussamuddin al-Gillani.

== In pop culture ==
Al-Gillani and his role in the Ottoman Empire was briefly mentioned in the Iraqi television drama Sarah Khatoon, which aired on Al Sharqiya.

== See also ==
- List of prime ministers of Iraq

Political offices
Preceded by None	Prime Minister of Iraq; 1920—1922	Succeeded by Abd al-Muhsin as-Sa'dun
