= Murat Özçelik =

Turkish politician

Deputy Leader of the Republican People's Party
- In office 3 November 2014 – 11 November 2015
- Leader: Kemal Kılıçdaroğlu

Member of the Grand National Assembly
- In office 7 June 2015 – 1 November 2015
- Constituency: İstanbul (III) (June 2015)

Undersecretary of Public Order and Security
- In office 16 November 2011 – 17 May 2012
- Preceded by: Mehmet Niyazi Tanılır
- Succeeded by: Kudret Bülbül

Ambassador of Turkey to Iraq
- In office 10 October 2009 – 1 November 2011
- Preceded by: Derya Kanbay
- Succeeded by: Yunus Demirer

Consul General of Turkey in Shanghai
- In office 1 January 1997 – 22 September 1998
- Preceded by: Position established
- Succeeded by: Akif Ayhan

Personal details
- Born: 1 January 1954 (age 72) Ankara, Turkey
- Party: Republican People's Party (CHP)
- Education: Middle East Technical University
- Occupation: Politician, diplomat, civil servant

Murat Özçelik (born 1 January 1954) is a Turkish politician, civil servant and diplomat from the Republican People's Party (CHP), who has served as a Member of Parliament for İstanbul's third electoral district since 7 June 2015. He served as the Deputy Leader of the CHP responsible for foreign relations between 3 November 2014 and 11 November 2015. He was part of the CHP delegation during coalition negotiations with the Justice and Development Party following the June 2015 general election. Before entering politics, Özçelik served as the Consul General of Turkey in Shanghai from 1997 to 1998, as the ambassador of Turkey to Iraq from 2009 to 2011 and as the Undersecretary of Public Order and Security from 2011 to 2012.

== Early life and career ==
Murat Özçelik was born on 1 January 1954 in Ankara and graduated from TED Ankara College before going on to study at the Department of Management at the Middle East Technical University (ODTÜ) Faculty of Economics and Administrative Sciences. He is married with two children.

=== Civil service career ===
Özçelik started working at the Ministry of Foreign Affairs in 1983. Between 1990 and 1992, he served as the Cabinet Chief for Turgut Özal, the then-President of Turkey. After serving at numerous other positions, he became the department manager at the Office of Information in 2005, serving concurrently as the foreign affairs deputy spokesperson. On 16 November 2011, he was appointed as the Undersecretary of Public Order and Security. Following a public statement by Özçelik, in which he claimed that he was being pressured into not doing his job the way he wanted and that he wanted to resign, the government removed him from the position on 17 May 2012. He was subsequently appointed as an advisor at the Foreign Ministry and subsequently retired there.

=== Diplomatic career ===
In January 1997, Özçelik became the first Turkish Consul General at Shanghai, a position in which he served until 22 September 1998.

Özçelik served as Turkey’s special representative in Iraq from 2007 to 2011 and then as Turkey’s ambassador to Baghdad. During this period, he was in the close circle of advisors that contacted the Iraqi Kurds and prepared the ground to improve strategic relations between Turkey, Iraq and the Iraqi Kurds. Reconciliation with the Iraqi Kurds inaugurated a period of economic and political cooperation that is counted among Turkey’s most significant foreign policy wins in the Middle East.

== Political career ==
Özçelik was a candidate to become a member of the Party Council of the Republican People's Party (CHP) during the party's 18th Extraordinary Convention held on 7 September 2014. However, he failed to win enough votes to enter the council, resulting in the party leader Kemal Kılıçdaroğlu appointing him as a personal advisor. It was alleged that Özçelik had stated in a closed meeting that he had voted for the Peoples' Democratic Party (HDP), though had the support of Kılıçdaroğlu since it was perceived that Kılıçdaroğlu wanted to give the task of forming a strong foreign policy to Özçelik. Numerous members of the party council who won a higher number of votes subsequently resigned from their positions in order to allow Özçelik to take a seat, which he did in October 2014. On 3 November 2014, he was appointed as the Deputy Leader of the CHP responsible for foreign relations. In the June 2015 general election, he was elected as a Member of Parliament for İstanbul's third electoral district. During a Party Council meeting on 24 August 2015, it was alleged that Özçelik had an argument with rival council member Durdu Özbolat, developing into a fight between the two men. This, as well as the fact that Özçelik had not been elected through a nomination primary before the June 2015 election, allegedly contributed to Kılıçdaroğlu's decision to not put him forward as a candidate for the November 2015 general election. Özçelik subsequently resigned his Deputy Leader position, but withdrew his resignation shortly after. He resigned as Deputy Leader and from the Party Council on 11 November 2015.

=== Controversy ===
Pro-status quo Turkish nationalists within the CHP were uneasy with Özçelik’s foreign policy activism in urging reconciliation with Iraqi Kurds. He was targeted by allegations launched by hawkish CHP nationalists that claimed he sympathised with the pro-Kurdish Peoples' Democratic Party (HDP). In an attempt to discredit his credibility within the CHP, far-right Turkish media claimed that he, his family and his friends voted for the HDP in the June 2015 general election. This claim was rejected by Özçelik as false.

== See also ==
- List of Turkish civil servants
