= Iran–Turkey relations =

Bilateral relations between Iran and Turkey

- Turkey: Iran

Diplomatic mission
- Embassy of Turkey, Tehran: Embassy of Iran, Ankara

The Islamic Republic of Iran and the Republic of Turkey maintain bilateral relations. Historically, the region has shared empires and conquests by the Achaemenids, Parthians, Macedonians, Seljuks, the Mongols and the Timurids. Their relationship is centuries old, dating to the 16th century when Sunni Ottoman Empire and the Shia Safavid empire fought each other for centuries. The two countries are also major trade partners and are perceived as mutually interdependent due to geographical proximity (Iran–Turkey border) as well as historically shared cultural, linguistic, and ethnic traits.

Iran and Turkey have long been at odds over conflicts such as those in Syria, Libya, and the South Caucasus. However, they also have shared common interests in some instances, such as the issue of Kurdish separatism and previously in the Qatar diplomatic crisis. Turkey has an embassy in Tehran and consulates in Mashhad, Tabriz and Urmia, while Iran has an embassy in Ankara and consulates in Istanbul, Erzurum and Trabzon.

== History ==
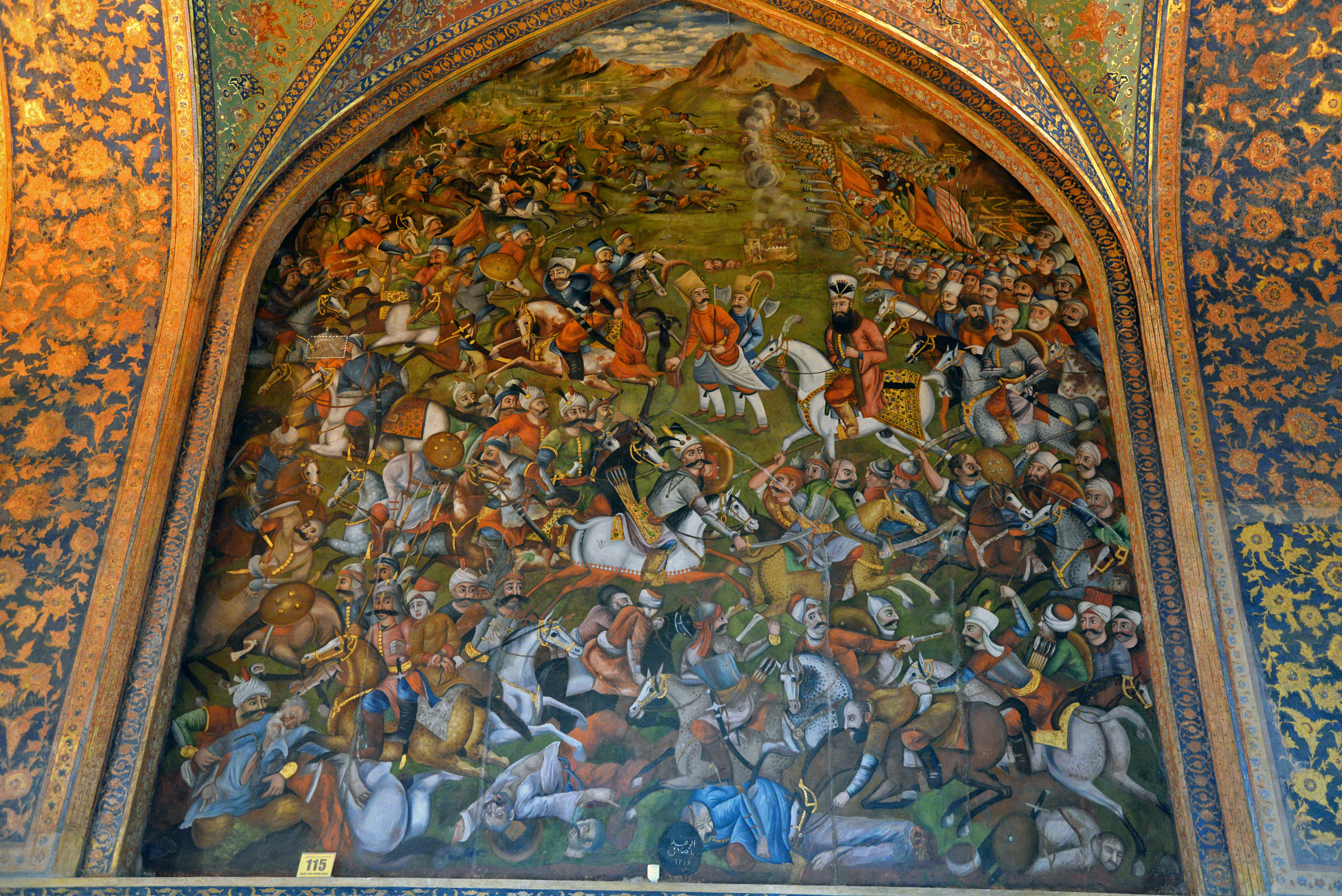
Artwork of the Battle of Chaldiran at the Chehel Sotoun Pavilion in Isfahan

Numerous times throughout the millennia-long history shared by the two neighboring nations, parts of the territory of Anatolia (or Asia Minor) were conquered by the various empires based in modern-day Iran, including the Median Empire, the Achaemenid Empire, the Parthian Empire, the Sasanian Empire, the Seljuk Empire (for a short period of time until IT’s independence), the Safavid Empire, and the Afsharid Empire, amongst others. In ancient times, the Asia Minor formed one of the core regions of the Achaemenid Empire, with the cities of Sardis and Smyrna in western Anatolia being the most notable. Iğdır Province, in what is now Eastern Anatolia, formed part of Qajar Iran up to the outcome of the Russo-Persian War (1826–1828) and the ratified Treaty of Turkmenchay.

Turks and Iranians share a common cultural heritage, known as the Turco-Persian tradition, which was a prominent characteristic of the Ghaznavid (977–1186), Seljuk (1037–1194), Sultanate of Rum (1077–1307), Ottoman (1299–1922), Timurid (1370–1507), Qara Qoyunlu (1374–1468), Aq Qoyunlu (1378–1501), and Safavid (1501–1736) Empires.

The Ottomans frequently imposed trade embargoes on the Safavid Empire to assert dominance over their eastern rival. Following the Ottoman victory at Chaldiran in 1514 and subsequent territorial gains, Selim I restricted trade routes for Safavid silk merchants and ordered the arrest of those entering Ottoman territory from Safavid lands. These measures, including the detention of Safavid-associated intellectuals, were lifted under Suleiman the Magnificent. A renewed embargo in 1603 was aimed at countering the resurgence of Safavid power, was less effective.

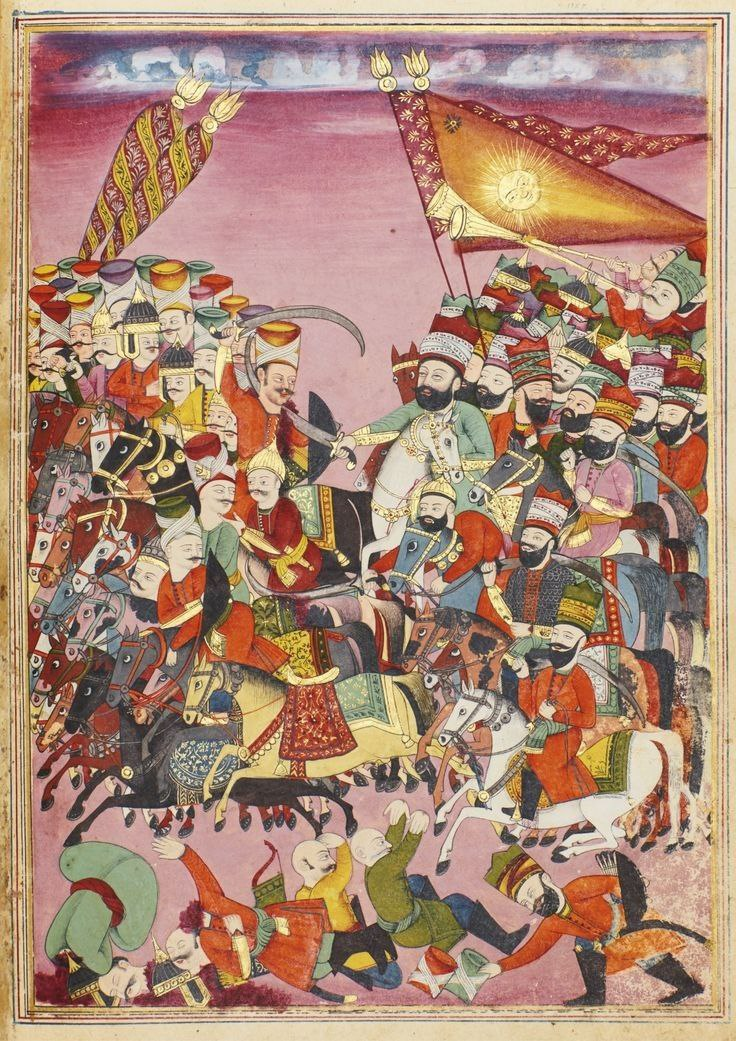
Nader Shah fights the Ottomans, Jahangosha-ye Naderi

The Ottoman-Iranian wars, lasting from the late 18th to the mid-19th century, were caused in part by sectarian tensions between Sunni Ottomans and Shia Iranians, territorial disputes, and competition over trade routes. The war of 1789 centered on the strategic Mount Ararat, where both empires sought to assert control. Iran's military offensives often targeted Ottoman fortifications, but the Ottomans, adopting defensive strategies, managed to repel these efforts. The Iranians and Ottomans clashed in 1789, 1821–1823, and 1830–1833. The Ottoman Empire won every war, defeating the Iranians. Under the leadership of Hafiz Ismail Pasha the Ottomans decisively prevailed in the war of 1821-23, solidifying their dominance in the region.

The period between 1789 and 1876 saw significant rivalry between the Ottoman Empire and Iran, particularly in their efforts to assert dominance in the region. Territorial disputes were a recurring source of conflict, exemplified by the Gok Tepe War (1794–1813), which concluded with Iran's significant territorial losses under the Treaty of Gulistan. Following Iranian defeat, Iran reapproached the Ottomans in order to counter Russia.

Iran's intelligence network also included the monitoring of Iranian minorities within Ottoman territories, aiming to protect their interests and undermine Ottoman authority. Information gathered through espionage was leveraged to strengthen Iran's defensive strategies and occasionally used in collaboration with European powers to counter Ottoman influence.

The Treaty of Kasr-i Shirin in 1876 officially ended the wars, but there were still border disputes between the countries. Issues such as the ownership of Mount Ararat remained a source of tension well into the 20th century. The Ottoman-Iranian wars still influence contemporary regional rivalries. The modern day cases of Syria and Iraq are examples of where sectarian and political divisions between contemporary Iran and Turkey, echo the historic tensions between the former empires.

=== 20th century ===
On 22 April 1926, the First "Treaty of Friendship" between Iran and Turkey was signed in Tehran. The basic principles included friendship, neutrality and non-aggression towards each other. The agreement also included possible joint action against groups who would try to disturb peace and security or who would try to overthrow either country's government. This policy was indirectly aimed at the internal problems both countries had with their Kurdish minorities.

On 23 January 1932, the first definitive frontier treaty between Turkey and Iran was signed in Tehran. The border between Turkey and Iran is one of the oldest in the world and has stayed more or less the same since the Battle of Chaldiran in 1514, and the Treaty of Zuhab. The 1932 treaty thus formalized a centuries-old status quo. On the same day, the countries signed a new Treaty of Friendship, as well as a Treaty of Conciliation, Judicial Settlement and Arbitration.

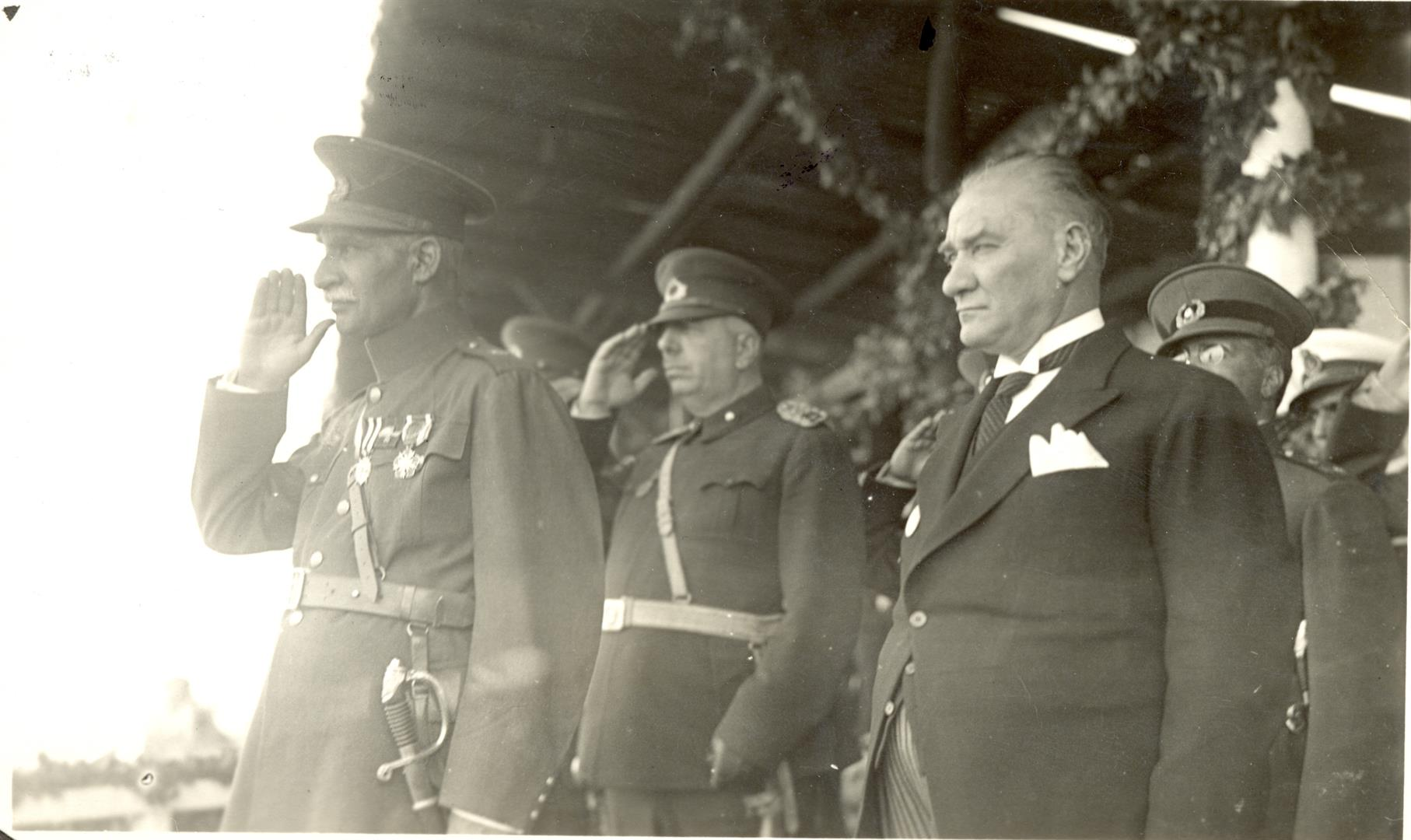
Turkish President Mustafa Kemal Atatürk (right) with Reza Shah Pahlavi, the Shah of Iran (left) in Ankara, 1934

Between 16 June and 2 July 1934, Reza Shah Pahlavi visited Turkey with several high-ranking officials, including General Hasan Arfa (at the invitation of Mustafa Kemal Atatürk). Several regions in Turkey were visited and attempts at close friendship and cooperation between the two leaders were made. Reza Shah was reportedly impressed by the republic's modernization reforms and he saw this as an example for his own country.

On 8 July 1937, a non-aggression pact was signed between Turkey, Iran, Iraq and Afghanistan, which later became known as the Treaty of Saadabad. The purpose of this agreement was to ensure security and peace in the Middle East.

In August 1955, the Central Treaty Organization (CENTO), a mutual security pact between Iran, Turkey, Iraq, Pakistan and Britain was established.

In July 1964, the Regional Cooperation for Development (RCD), aimed at joint economic projects between Iran, Turkey and Pakistan, was established.

In 1964, Ruhollah Khomeini was sent to exile in Bursa and he stayed there for eleven months. On 5 September 1965, Khomeini left Turkey and went to Najaf in Iraq.

A period of coldness passed after the 1979 Iranian Revolution which caused major changes in Iran and the Middle Eastern status quo. Today, Iran and Turkey closely cooperate in a wide variety of fields, such as fighting terrorism, drug trafficking, and promoting stability in Iraq and Central Asia. However, the two countries have competed for influence since the 1990s; this has been escalating since the 2010s in various fronts across MENA and South Asia.

=== 21st century ===
==== Iranian nuclear program ====
In May 2010, Turkish Prime Minister Recep Tayyip Erdogan made an unscheduled trip to Tehran in coordination with Brazilian President Lula da Silva to make an agreement to outsource Iranian uranium enrichment to his country to avoid further sanctions on Iran.

The decision of Turkey to host a radar system to track missiles launched from Iran has been seen by the Iranians as a serious break in relations.

In a 2012 Pew Research Global Attitudes Survey, 54% of Turks oppose Iran's acquisition of nuclear weapons, 46% consider a nuclear-armed Iran somewhat of a threat and 26% support the use of military force to prevent Iran from developing nuclear weapons. 37% of Turks believe that Iran is a minor threat/no threat at all, the lowest percentage between surveyed countries in MENA region (even lower than Jordan at 55%). But only 34% of Turkey's population approves of tougher sanctions on Iran, compared to 52% of Turks disapproving of sanctions.

==== NATO missile shield crisis ====
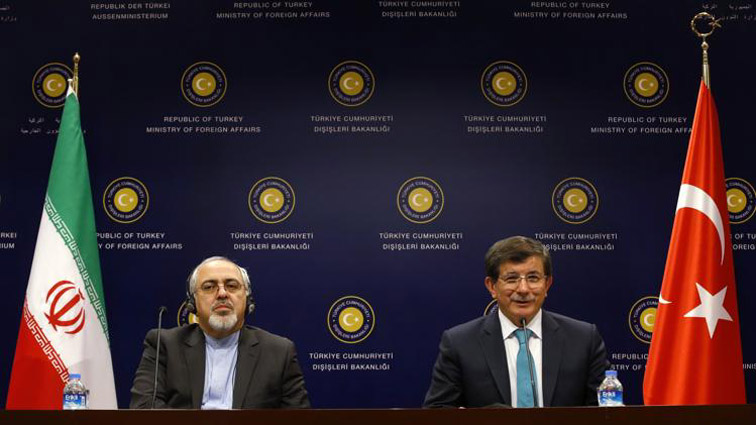
Iranian Foreign Minister Mohammad Javad Zarif and Turkish Foreign Minister Ahmet Davutoğlu during a joint press conference in Ankara, 2013.

Turkey, the largest NATO member in the region, hosted the establishment of a NATO missile shield in September 2011 which has caused a crisis between Turkey and Iran. Iran claimed that the missile shield is a US plot to protect Israel from any counter-attack should Israel target Iran's nuclear facilities. In addition, Ayatollah Ali Khamenei stated that Turkey should rethink its policies over Syria, the missile shield, and promotion of secularism over the Arab world following the Arab Spring.

Iranian Major General Yahya Rahim Safavi also expressed his opinion over the situation: "the behaviour of Turkish statesmen towards Syria and Iran is wrong and, I believe, they are acting in line with the goals of America," adding that "if Turkey does not distance itself from this unconventional political behavior it will have both the Turkish people turning away from it domestically and the neighboring countries of Syria, Iraq and Iran reassessing their political ties."

Turkey stated that the NATO missile system neither causes a threat or targets any particular nation. Turkish Minister of National Defense, İsmet Yılmaz, insisted that the system's aim is to secure Europe, as well as for the security of Turkey.

On 23 October 2011, US Secretary of State Hillary Clinton warned Iran over the United States' presence in Turkey, saying that "Iran would be badly miscalculating if they did not look at the entire region and all of our presence in many countries, both in bases and in training with NATO allies, like Turkey.”

In November 2011, the head of the Revolutionary Guard's aerospace division threatened to strike Turkey if other countries attacked Iran.

==== Relations of Turkey and Iran with Israel ====
In the past, Turkey's ties with Israel have caused various disagreements between Ankara and Tehran. However, Turkey's neutral stance with regards to the disputes between Israel and Iran has secured the maintenance of friendly bilateral relations. The growing trade between Turkey and Iran indicates the two countries’ willingness to strengthen mutual ties.

Turkey's relations with Israel have deteriorated since the Gaza War (2008–09), the 2010 Gaza flotilla raid and the 2014 Israel–Gaza conflict. From 2010 to 2016, Turkey had no diplomatic relations with Israel at the ambassadorial level. However, on 28 June 2016, Turkey and Israel signed an agreement to normalize relations, which included a $20 million compensation fund from Israel to Turkish families affected by the Gaza-bound flotilla attack, an eventual return of ambassadors and initial talks of a natural gas pipeline.

===== Iran–Israel war =====
Following the Iran–Israel war, Turkish Foreign Minister Hakan Fidan characterized Iran's missile response to Israeli aggression as a legitimate act of self-defense, underscoring Iran's right to protect itself.

==== 2026 Iran war ====
On 4 March 2026, NATO air and missile defense installations in Turkey and the Eastern Mediterranean intercepted a ballistic missile that was bound for Turkey, with the anti-ballistic munition falling in Dörtyol, Hatay. Following the incident, Turkish officials remarked that the missile was launched from Iran and passed by Iraq and Syria before its shootdown. Turkey then asserted her "right to retaliate." Iranian ambassador in Ankara was shortly after summoned to the Ministry of Foreign Affairs, in which Iran denied any involvement.

Five days later, on 9 March 2026, another ballistic missile was downed over Gaziantep, a Turkish city of two million. The debris was removed by the security services and there were no casualties reported. The country's defense ministry released another firm statement, reiterating that she will "decisively" respond to any threat against her soil.

Turkish foreign minister Hakan Fidan told Iranian foreign minister Abbas Araghchi that Iran’s violation of Turkish airspace was "unacceptable". Following the second Iranian missile to violate the Turkish airspace, on March 10, 2026, Erdogan sent a firm warning to Iran, telling it to stop its “wrong and provocative steps.”. On March 30, 2026 NATO verified a fourth interception of Iranian missiles in Turkey's airspace, this despite Iran denying the other three. Hakan Fidan said that Turkey is strongly against any return to war between Iran and the United States. He also expressed hope that the negotiations between Iran and the US would end soon, warning that another war would only bring more destruction.

On 22 November 2026, Turkish Foreign Minister Hakan Fidan said a possible deal between Washington and Tehran matters for more than just reopening the Strait of Hormuz — it could also help ease global financial strains. In an interview with Turkish broadcaster TGRT Haber, he warned that the economic toll of the Iran war, made worse by the fact that the war has no end in sight, is growing heavier by the day for many countries and could lead to "destructive effects." Fidan said talks over the Strait of Hormuz are still going on, with both sides sending messages and demands back and forth, even though the process looks stuck for now. He also said mediation efforts are continuing and mentioned that he had recently spoken about the crisis with Qatar's Prime Minister and Foreign Minister, Mohammed bin Abdulrahman Al Thani.

==== Since the Arab Spring and Syrian Civil War ====
Iran's relations with Turkey have occasionally soured over the Turkish AKP government's active involvement in regional disputes between Shia and Sunni groups since the dawn of the Arab Spring. Iran firmly backs the Syrian government of Bashar al-Assad (formed mostly of Alawites), while the AKP government in Turkey (which has its roots in political Islam) supports the Syrian opposition (formed mostly of Sunni Muslims).

Both Turkey and Iran supported the Egyptian revolution of 2011 and the subsequent Mohamed Morsi government, and condemned the 2013 Egyptian coup d'état.

During the 2015 military intervention in Yemen, Iran and Turkey supported rival groups (Shia and Sunni, respectively), which led to official arguments between Recep Tayyip Erdoğan and Mohammad Javad Zarif. Erdoğan stated that "Iran and the terrorist groups must withdraw" and Zarif replied, "Turkey makes strategic mistakes". However, a few days later, Erdoğan went to Tehran for talks on improving Turkish-Iranian trade relations and was received by Ali Khamenei and Rouhani.

Before the ascent of the Islamist AKP government to power in 2002, Turkey (a constitutionally secular state) had maintained a neutral foreign policy with regards to the religious and sectarian conflicts in the region.

Turkey and Iran's differing geopolitical goals in Syria and Iraq have also led to increased tension and suspicion. Turkey has on multiple occasions clashed with Iranian-backed Shiite militias such as Hezbollah and Ashab al-Kahf.

Anti-Iranian views have been propagated by Turkish media like Yeni Akit and Yeni Şafak due to the Iranian role during the Battle of Aleppo (2012–16).

Other matters also aggravate relations, such as both countries supporting opposing sides in Yemeni Civil War (2015–present), and Turkey's installation of a NATO radar tracking Iranian activities (Mahmoud Ahmadinejad said that the NATO defense system deployed in southeast Turkey was meant to protect Israel from Iranian missile attacks).

===== Reconciliation =====
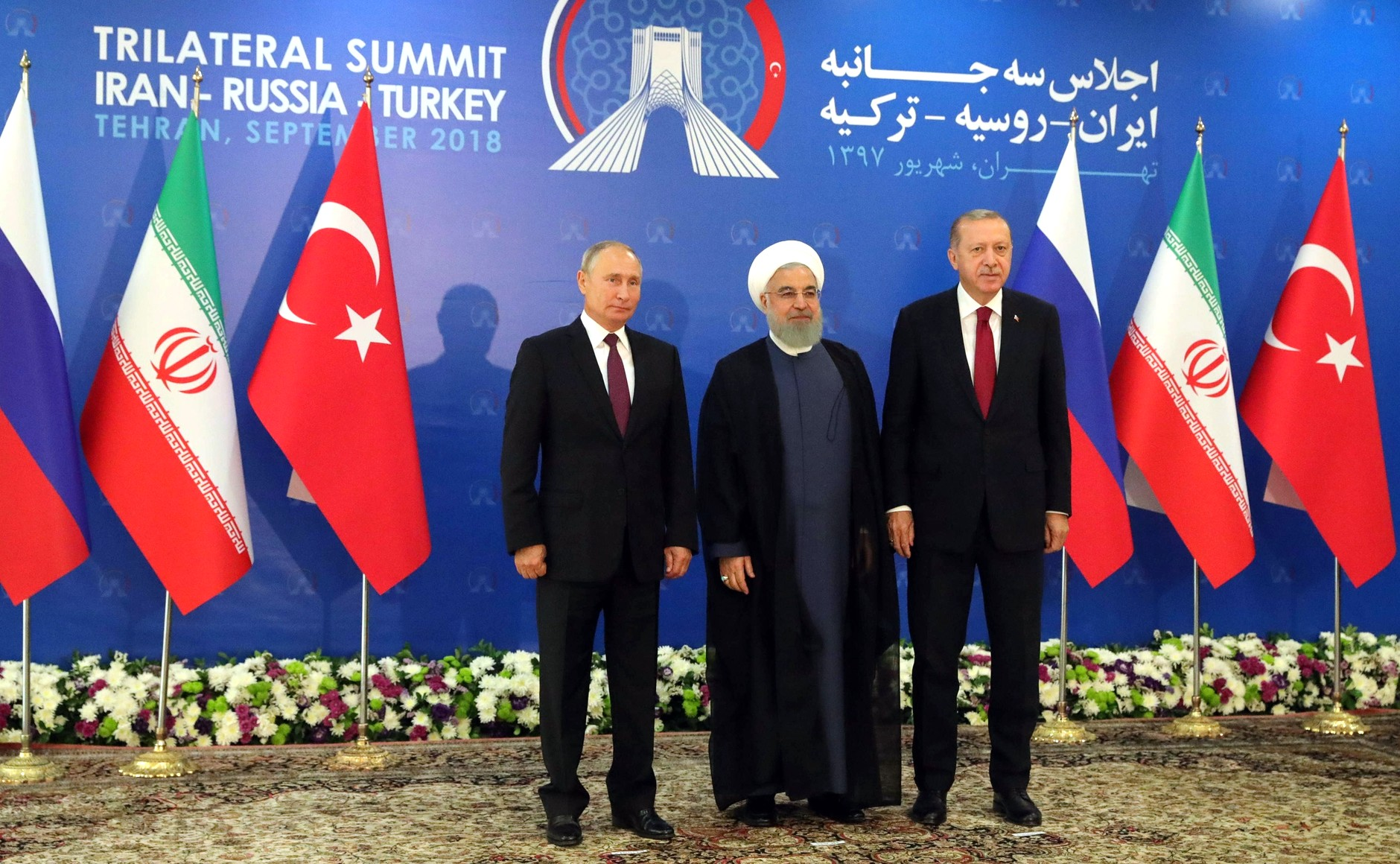
Russian President Vladimir Putin, Turkish President Recep Tayyip Erdoğan and Iranian President Hassan Rouhani in Tehran, September 2018

Iran was quick to condemn the 2016 Turkish coup d'état attempt, leading to improved relations between the two countries.

From January 2017 onward, Turkey has collaborated closely with Iran and Russia in the Astana talks to resolve the Syrian Civil War.

Turkey's relations with Iran further improved during the 2017 Qatar diplomatic crisis, where both countries backed Qatar in a dispute with Saudi Arabia and the United Arab Emirates.

Turkey condemned the 2017–18 Iranian protests, accusing the United States and Israel of interference in internal Iranian affairs.

Iran and Turkey also backed one another in their respective disputes with the United States in summer 2018, with Turkey publicly opposing U.S. sanctions on Iran after U.S. withdrawal from the Iran nuclear deal, and Iran condemning U.S. sanctions on Turkey over the detention of Andrew Brunson. Both Turkey and Iran say they want to put a stop to the conflict even though both countries are supporting opposing sides in the Syrian war.

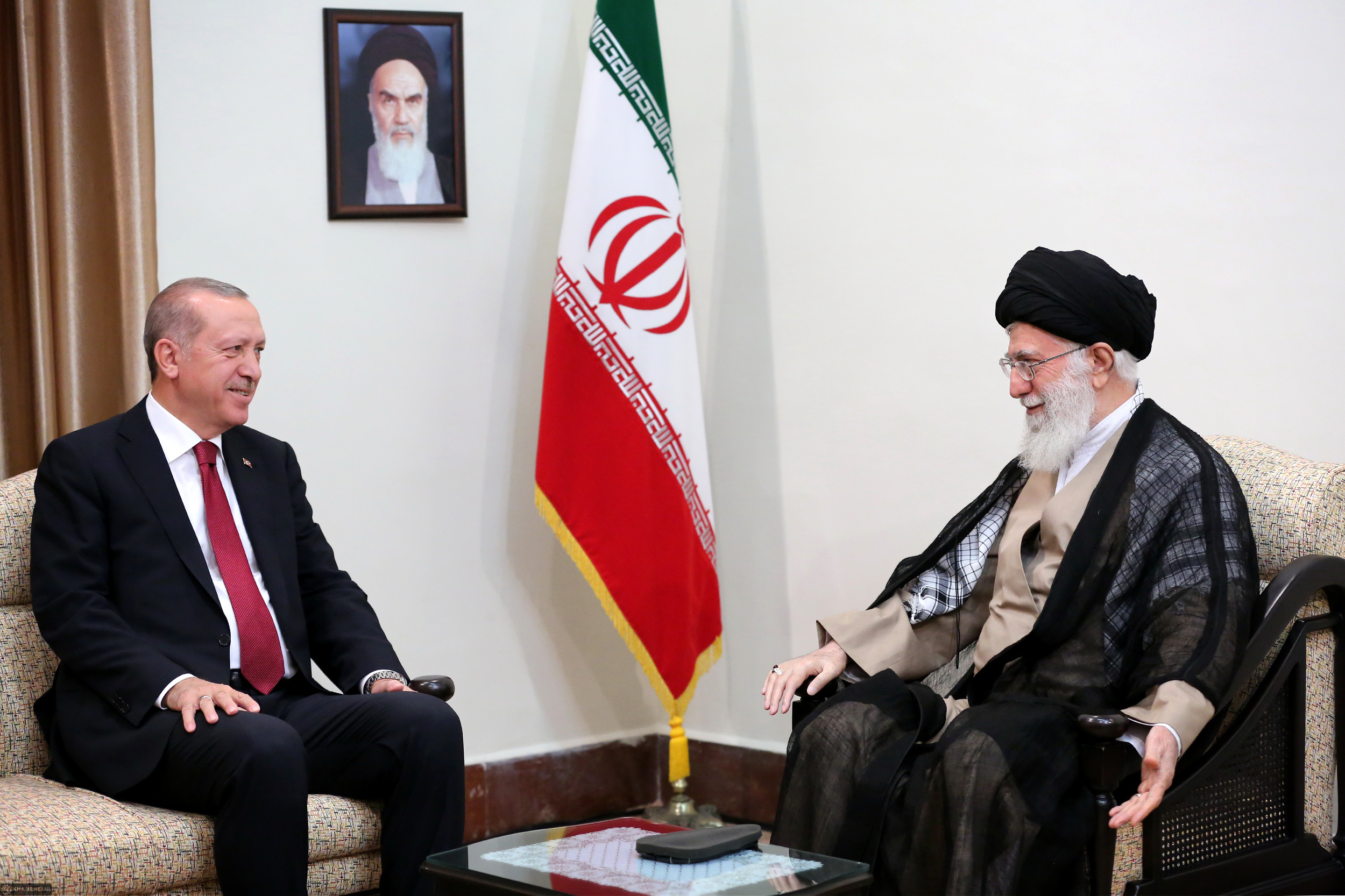
Iran's Supreme Leader Ayatollah Ali Khamenei with Turkish President Erdoğan in Tehran, 2018

In February 2019, Turkey refused an invitation by the United States to attend a summit in Warsaw on countering Iranian influence in the Middle East, on the grounds that it "targets one country".

In January 2020, Turkey condemned the assassination of Qasem Soleimani by the United States, claiming it would lead to instability in the region. Erdogan later denied media reports that he had described Soleimani as a "martyr" in a phone conversation with President Rouhani.

===== Setback =====
The reconciliation suffered a massive setback when Turkey launched a military offensive against Rojava and the Syrian government. Iran, which is on good term with Turkey since the coup, began to criticize and condemn Turkey for invading Syria and violating Syrian territorial rights. Iranian foreign minister Mohammad Javad Zarif has voiced opposition to the offensive, viewing it as a violation of Syria's sovereignty. In addition, Iran's parliamentary speaker Ali Larijani canceled his scheduled trip to Turkey. Iran and Turkey's lack of trust for each other has hampered them from achieving their various economic and political goals.

While the two countries are competing for influence in Central Asia, particularly in Muslim republics, it is hindering them from becoming real allies.

Relations declined further after the Syrian Army shelled the Turkish Army in Idlib, as Syria is backed by Iran and the Iranian Army's presence in northern Syria.

Turkish leaders have warned Iran against supporting groups opposed to the new Sunni Islamist-led regime in Syria. This comes as tensions between Turkey and Iran widen following the collapse of Bashar al-Assad's regime. Turkish officials are concerned about potential Iranian backing for Kurdish forces and Alawite factions in Syria, which could counterbalance Turkish influence in the region, fearing that Iran will try to rebuild its influence and undermine Turkish-backed forces. Iran, in turn, accuses Turkey of meddling in Syria and stoking separatist sentiments among ethnic Azeris and Kurds within Iran, viewing Turkey's actions as an attempt to strategically marginalize Iran.

===== Contemporary relations =====
In 2020, following the Israel–United Arab Emirates peace agreement that normalised Israel–United Arab Emirates relations, Iran and Turkey were among the most vocal critics against the peace treaty.

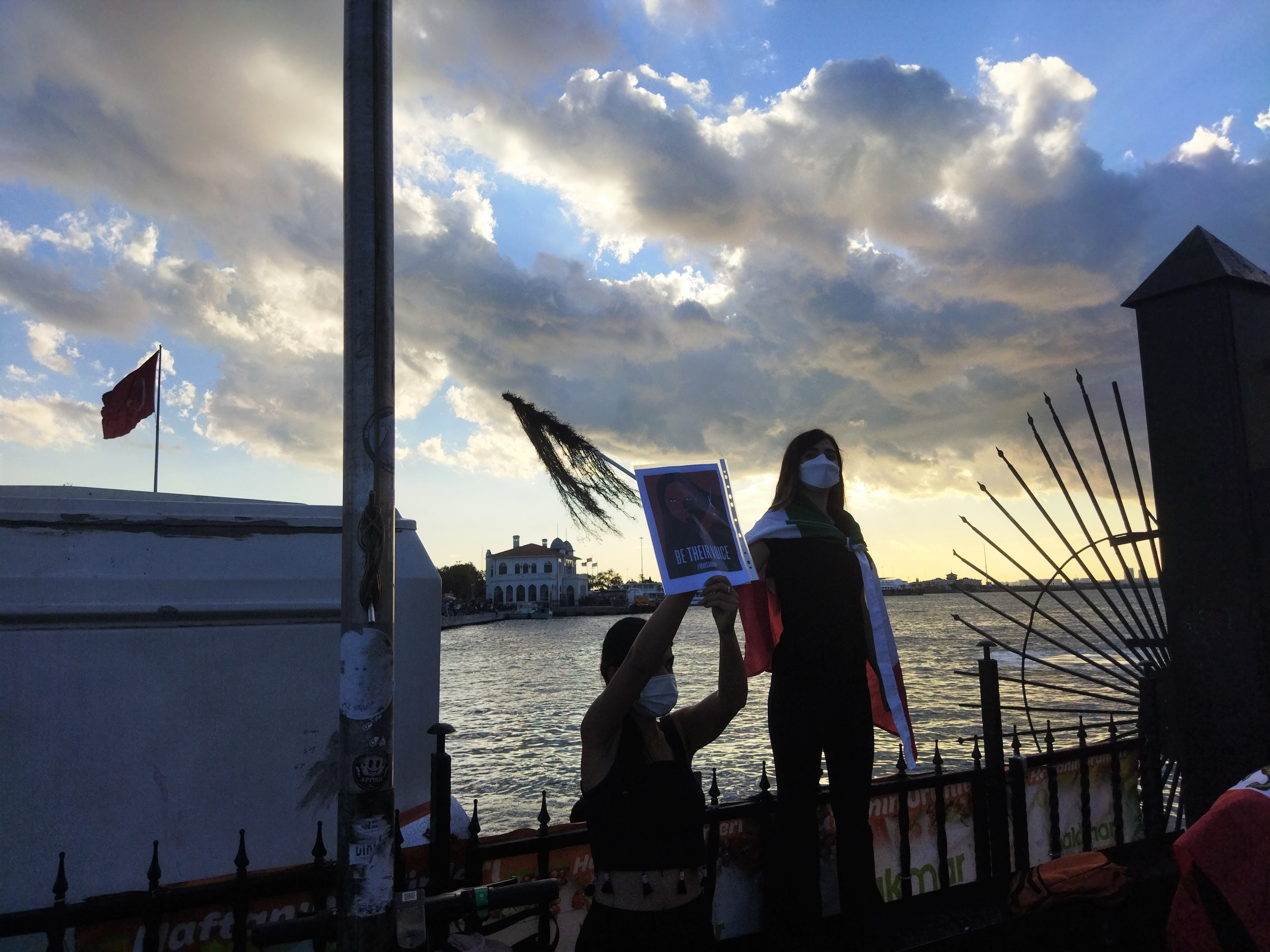
Two activists protesting in Istanbul, Turkey as part of the Mahsa Amini protests

Iran has been thought to have a multifaceted role in the Second Libyan conflict. Israel has accused Iran of providing armament support to anti-Turkish warlord Khalifa Haftar in Libya. However, Iran later publicly expressed support for the Turkish military intervention in the Second Libyan Civil War. A United Nations report nonetheless revealed that anti-tank missiles used by Haftar's forces had originated in Iran, though it was unable to ascertain if it had been transferred in violation of sanctions. However, Iranian anti-tank missiles were also alleged by the UN to have been transferred to Turkish-backed forces in Libya.

Iran has strongly denied reports that Iranian trucks were involved in transferring Russian armaments to Armenia during the 2020 Nagorno-Karabakh conflict, and offered to mediate between Armenia and Turkish ally Azerbaijan. Iran also reaffirmed its support for Azerbaijan's "territorial integrity". However, Iran has been critical of Turkey's role in the clashes, calling on Turkey to support peace initiatives rather than adding "fuel to the fire". Iran also warned of the presence of "terrorists" near its border, referring to the Syrian jihadists which Turkey and Azerbaijan have been accused of using in Nagorno-Karabakh. In addition, Iran arrested several pro-Azerbaijan protesters in northern and northwestern Iranian cities, including some Turkish citizens. Relations between Azerbaijan and Iran have been historically uneasy, mainly due to Iran's fear of Pan-Turkist sentiments promoted by Azerbaijani leaders like Abulfaz Elchibey, as well as Azerbaijan's close relations with Iran's greatest regional adversary, Israel. On the other hand, relations between Armenia and Iran have remained close because of their strong economic ties and Armenia's military alliance with Iranian ally and Turkish rival Russia.

Relations between Turkey and Iran worsened after Turkish President Recep Tayyip Erdogan recited a poem claiming the lands of Iranian Azerbaijan as the territory of the Republic of Azerbaijan, sparking backlash from Iran, fearing the rise of Pan-Turkism among its Iranian Azeri population. Iranian Foreign Minister Mohammad Javad Zarif stated: "President Erdogan was not informed that what he ill-recited in Baku refers to the forcible separation of areas north of Aras from Iranian motherland. Didn't he realize that he was undermining the sovereignty of the Republic of Azerbaijan? No one can talk about our beloved Azerbaijan." Iran also summoned the Turkish ambassador for explanation. On 12 December, Turkey summoned the Iranian ambassador to Ankara considering Tehran's “aggressive” reaction to Erdogan's poem. Turkey's foreign minister Mevlut Cavusoglu said to Zarif on a phone call that Iran's public statements against the Turkish leader were unacceptable and "baseless". Iran initiated a boycott of Turkish goods as a result of Erdogan's comments.

On 15 February 2021, an Iranian-backed proxy group, Ashab al-Kahf, carried out a missile attack on a Turkish military base in Iraq as retaliation for a Turkish offensive against the Kurdistan Workers' Party (PKK), which is classified as a terrorist group by the US and EU, in northern Iraq. Additionally, Harakat Hezbollah al-Nujaba, another Iranian proxy, issued a warning that it would attack Turkey if it did not end its operations in Iraq. The attack was perceived as a warning from Iran to Turkey against the latter's operations against the PKK. Turkish state-owned media claimed that the attack reflected Iran's support for the group. On 23 February, Iran's ambassador to Baghdad, Iraj Masjedi, mentioned that "Turkish forces should not pose a threat or violate Iraqi soil", and criticized Turkish intentions to control Sinjar. On 27 February, Turkey's ambassador to Iraq, Fatih Yıldız, tweeted that "Ambassador of Iran would be the last person to lecture Turkey about respecting borders of Iraq".

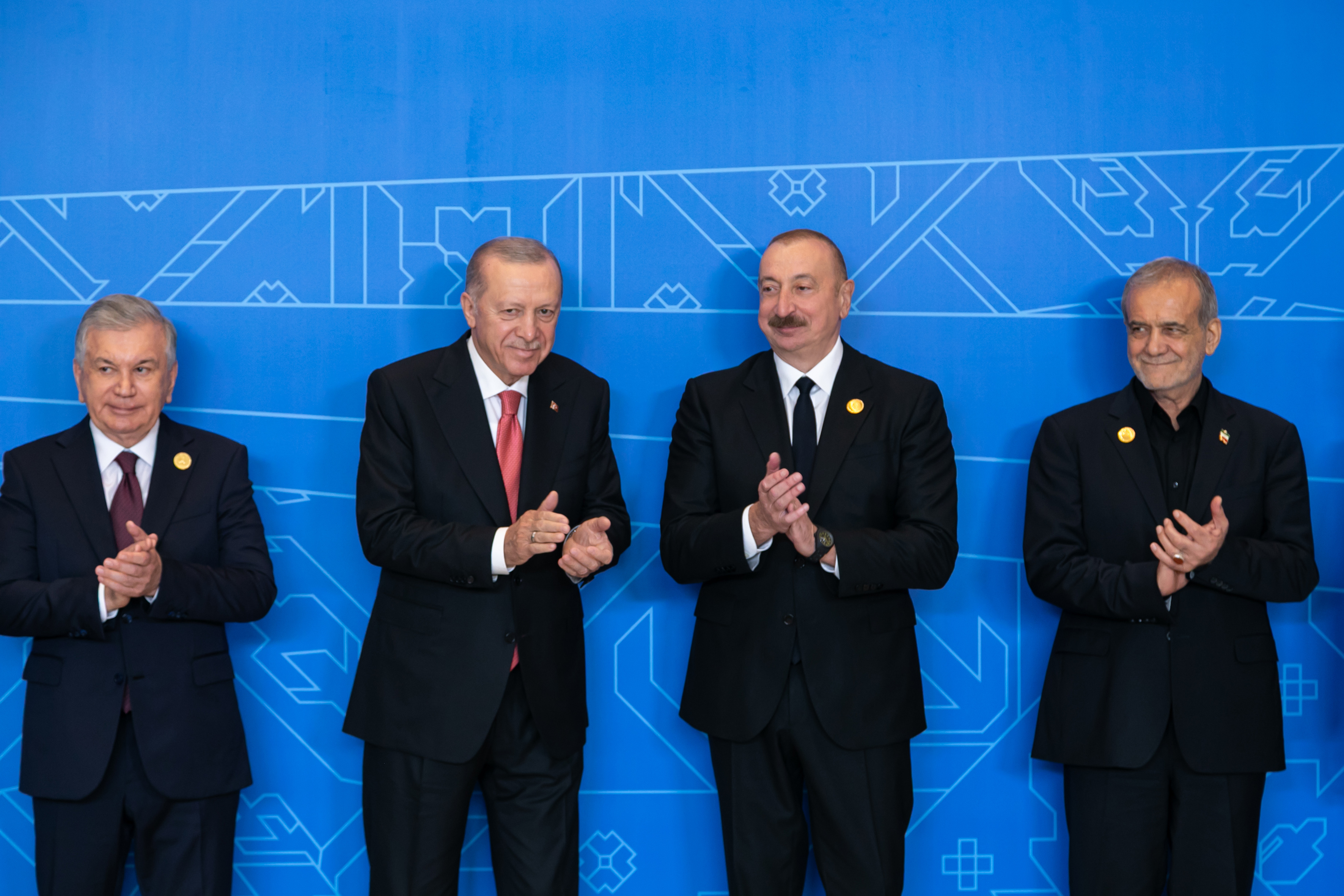
Turkish President Erdoğan and Iranian President Masoud Pezeshkian (right) at the 17th ECO Summit in Khankendi, Azerbaijan, 4 July 2025

In December 2024, the Syrian opposition offensives, tacitly endorsed by Turkey, was launched, resulted in the collapse of the Assad regime, which was backed by Iran; Iranian Foreign Minister Abbas Araghchi had a heated argument against Turkish counterpart Hakan Fidan, before later accused Turkey of enabling the assault, hampering the already difficult relations between Iran and Turkey. In the days following the fall of the Assad regime in Syria, Ayatollah Khamenei appeared to blame Turkey, alongside the U.S. and Israel, for the ousting of Bashar al-Assad. Khamenei said: "There should be no doubt that what has happened in Syria is the result of a joint American and Zionist plan. Yes, a neighboring country of Syria has played a clear role in this regard, continues to do so even now—this is evident to everyone... The aggressors I mentioned each have their own motives. Their goals are different—some seek to occupy land in northern or southern Syria, while America aims to solidify its foothold in the region." Khamenei's reference to a 'neighboring country' is commonly interpreted to mean Turkey.

On 21 January 2026, during the 2025–2026 Iranian protests, it was reported that Turkey, which does not require visas for Iranian citizens, had struck an agreement with the Islamic Republic to arrest and potentially return protesters and refugees who challenge the Iranian government. In cooperation with Turkish government, the Islamic Republic has in the past abducted several of its opponents from Turkey and later executed them in Iran.

Starting March 2026, during the 2026 Iran war, Iran had started firing ballistic missiles and drones at Turkey.

== Rivalry ==
Turkey's expanding geopolitical influence has come at the expense of Iran's diminishing role, particularly in regions of mutual interest. In South Caucasus Turkey's direct support for Azerbaijan in the Nagorno-Karabakh conflict has shifted the regional balance. Turkey's strengthened role, coupled with Russia's dominance, has left Iran with reduced influence in this strategically significant area. Turkey's growing ties with Sunni actors in Lebanon are interpreted by Dalay as a potential challenge to Iran-backed Hezbollah, part of a broader Turkish effort to counter Iranian influence across the Middle East.

In northwestern Syria, the dynamics of the Astana trio (Russia, Turkey, and Iran) have marginalized Iran. Discussions about Idlib were a bilateral affair between Russia and Turkey, bypassing Iran. This signals a narrowing space for Iran to shape the outcomes in Syria. Turkey asserted its position alongside Russia following the waning of Iranian power in the region.

Turkey used the Arab spring as an opportunity to reassert themselves in previous spheres of influence. The Turks exploited strife within Sunni communities to assert themselves within. The New Lines Magazine described the rivalry in the middle east shifting from Iran vs Saudi Arabia to Iran vs Turkey.

in the 2020s Iran perceived Turkey as a growing threat to its regional influence. In the early 2020s Iran held major influence over territories once controlled by Turkey, reversing centuries-old dynamics from the Ottoman-Safavid rivalry. Iran's strategy prioritizes maintaining its foothold in Syria and leveraging Kurdish separatism in northern Iraq to counter Turkey's expansionist ambitions.

Turkey, on the other hand, seeks to break Iran's regional stronghold. Turkish foreign policy holds areas like northern Iraq and Syria as critical for asserting Turkish influence. The Sinjar region, in particular, is a strategic battleground, as it links Iranian influence across Iraq and Syria.

New Lines Magazine described Iran as perceiving itself as the leading actor in the Resistance axis composed mainly of Shiite Muslims while Turkey wishes to establish itself as the leader of the sunni world.

Following the fall of Iran backed Bashar Al Assad in Syria, Turkey became the dominant player through the new Turkish backed rulers.

Turkey's economic trade has grown with Georgia and Azerbaijan. This growth translated into growing influence at the expense of Iranian influence which frustrated the Iranians. The Iranians are concerned with the "Pan-Turkist" agenda which they believe the Turks are pursuing.

In March 2025, Turkish foreign minister Hakan Fidan during an interview with Al-Jazeera criticised Iranian policies in Syria and Iraq and said that the policy that Iran is following by means of militias in the region is very dangerous and that he had previously shared these ideas with Qasem Soleimani. Fidan stated that if Iran continues this policy and intervenes in the internal affairs of other countries, other countries will not remain spectators and will intervene in Iran's internal affairs in retaliation. Some analysts interpreted Fidan's statement as implying that Iran would support the YPG in Syria and that Turkey could use the Turkish minority in Iran in response. Iranian foreign ministry spokesman Esmaeil Baqaei responded by accusing Turkey of "turning a blind eye to the hidden American and Israeli hands influencing regional developments", while noting that Iran had opposed the 2016 Turkish coup attempt and supported the disarmament of the Kurdistan Workers' Party.

=== Rivalry over proxies ===
The conflict has its roots in a period of tense relations between Iran and Turkey after the Iranian Revolution. Despite the two countries cooperating in a wide variety of fields (especially against the establishment of an independent Kurdish state), Iran and Turkey have competed for geopolitical influence since the 1990s. In September 2011, Turkey hosted the establishment of a NATO missile shield, causing a crisis with Iran. While criticising the missile shield, Supreme Leader Ali Khamenei has also stated that Turkey should rethink many of its regional policies.

In 1994, Turkey and Iran were drawn into a proxy war between Kurdistan Democratic Party and Patriotic Union of Kurdistan in the de facto autonomous Iraqi Kurdistan region. Ankara provided support including arms to the KDP, Tehran backed the PUK.

A commander of the Iranian Revolutionary Guard Corps, Yahya Rahim Safavi, accused Turkish authorities of "acting in line with the goals of America", and that if Turkey did not change its policies, Iran, Iraq, and Syria would be "reassessing their political ties."

The proxy conflict was worsened due to the active involvement of Turkish government in regional disputes in Iraq and Syria as well as its relations with Azerbaijan. Iran suspected that Turkey with the support of the United States, seek to expand its influence in the Zangezur corridor, a move that is likely to undercut Iranian influence in the north and in the Caucasus.

The proxy conflict has continued despite Turkish President Recep Tayyip Erdoğan's rhetoric in politically shifting away from the West and towards Russia and Iran.

=== Syria ===
During the Syrian civil war, Iran intervened in support of Ba'athist Syria, while Turkey intervened in support of the opposition. Both Iran and Turkey were militarily involved. Turkey backed the Syrian National Army, while Iran backed the Syrian Arab Army, as well as Hezbollah, and other Shia militias. Hezbollah had clashed with the Turkish military in Syria. Turkish media organisations like Yeni Akit and Yeni Şafak also spread Anti-Iranian sentiment due to the Iranian role in Syria. Turkey and Iran continued to oppose each other during the Syrian civil war.

Turkey used the rise of the Muslim Brotherhood to push for the "Turkish model" and called Assad's regime to legalize its branch in Syria.

Shared ethnic and cultural ties between Kurds and Iran were a factor in establishing relations between Iran and Kurdish groups in Iran and Syria, which Iran had supplied weapons to on many occasions. Tensions between Iran and Turkey with regard to the Kurds were significant. In addition, Iran condemned all the military operations launched by Turkey against Kurdish forces in Syria.

Iran had also secretly cooperated with various Syrian Kurdish groups such as the People's Protection Units (YPG) and the Kurdistan Workers' Party to some extent, both of which Turkey considered terrorist groups, and Turkish sources often linked Iran to the PKK and the YPG. The Kurdish National Council (ENKS) accused YPG's political branch Democratic Union Party of being a "gendarmerie of Assad and Iran" and allegedly Iran helped in reaching an agreement between the YPG and the government. ENKS has good relations to Turkey and was a member of the Turkish-backed National Coalition of Syrian Revolutionary and Opposition Forces until 2025.

In 2019, Turkey launched an offensive in northern Syria, against the Syrian Democratic Forces and Syrian Arab Armed Forces, causing Iran to criticize Turkey. Iranian foreign minister Mohammad Javad Zarif claimed that it was a violation of Syria's sovereignty. Ali Larijani also canceled his trip to Turkey.

In 2022, Iran criticized Turkey's Operation Claw-Sword in northern Iraq and Syria. Ayatollah Ali Khamenei gave a warning to Turkey. Stating that a military conflict would "harmful" for Turkey and Syria and the entire region. Throughout 2022-2024, Turkey tried to normalize ties with Bashar al-Assad in respect to Astana Talks. Erdoğan stated that he could invite Assad to a meeting in Turkey at any time. Iran remained critical of any Sunni and Turkish influence in Syria, according to a senior Turkish government official, Tehran was "antagonistic" toward Turkey in Syria and that it was Russia that pushed Turkey toward reconciliation, not Iran, but that there was "no progress at all." Syrian–Turkish normalization ultimately failed as both Assad regime and Iran remained critical of Turkish influence.

In December 2024, after the Syrian opposition offensives, Abbas Araghchi had a heated argument with Hakan Fidan, claiming that Turkey had allowed the offensive. Concurrently, Erdoğan stated that Assad failed to understand the value of the hand extended by Turkey.

In January 2025, Turkey claimed that Iran had sent over 1,500 drones to the SDF, which the SDF had denied.

In March 2025, Iran and Turkey both summoned the ambassadors after Hakan Fidan accused Iran of supporting Kurdish militias. His statements caused outrage in Iran. Many interpreted the Turkish statements as threats to support Iranian Azerbaijani separatists if Iran did not cut support for Kurdish militias in Syria.

=== Iraq ===
After the Islamic State was defeated, Iran backed Shia Turkmen interests, while Turkey backed Sunni Turkmen interests. They often came in conflict. Iran and Turkey backed opposing political factions in Iraq. They also backed opposing militant groups. During the 2017 Iraqi–Kurdish conflict, Shia militias captured Sinjar from the KDP Peshmerga. The Shia militias also entered a tactical alliance with the YBŞ and the PKK. Turkey turned against the Shia militias, as it supported the Kurdistan Region, especially the KDP, and opposed the PKK. The conflict escalated in October 2020, after the Sinjar agreement mediated by the United Nations between the KRG and Iraq, which mandated the withdrawal of both the PKK and PMF. In 2021, various Shia militias began attacking Turkish presence in Iraq after Turkey launched operations against the PKK in Iraqi Kurdistan. After the Fall of the Assad regime, Harakat Hezbollah al-Nujaba warned about the existence of a Turkish-backed "operations room" in Iraq which planned on launching an attack similar to the 2024 Syrian offensives, and stressed that the United Kingdom was leading the operations room, with intelligence participation from NATO and Israel.

=== Yemen ===
During the Yemeni civil war, Iran and Turkey supported rival groups, causing official arguments between Recep Tayyip Erdoğan and Mohammad Javad Zarif. Erdoğan stated that "Iran and the terrorist groups must withdraw", while Zarif stated that "Turkey makes strategic mistakes". Turkey was also accused of providing intelligence and aid to Saudi Arabia against the Houthis in Yemen.

=== Libya ===
During the Second Libyan conflict, Iran was accused by Israel of providing support to the anti-Turkish Khalifa Haftar and supplied his forces with anti-tank missiles. However, Iran in 2020 voiced support for the Turkish-backed Government of National Accord.

Turkish officials saw the 2013 Egyptian coup d'état and 2019 Sudanese coup d'état as an attempt to limit Turkish influence. The Muslim Brotherhood had ties to the Government of National Accord in Libya and the Turkish-backed Syrian National Council and National Front for Liberation in Syria.

Saudi-Turkish rapprochement after the end of the Qatar diplomatic crisis further complicated the situation against Iran. Turkey has successfully improved its relations with Egypt, Saudi Arabia, and the United Arab Emirates, while Iran remains isolated. Saddam Haftar, the son of Khalifa Haftar, has made multiple visits to Turkey about military cooperation. Haftar aligned Libyan House of Representatives decided to form a committee to study the maritime agreement signed with Turkey by Government of National Accord.

Decline of Iran's influence at the expense of Israel has also shifted ties between Egypt and Turkey more positively, in addition to Turkey's reconciliation with both Saudi Arabia and the UAE. Both countries agreed to cooperate closely on Libya and Sudan.

=== Iran ===
In the 1990s, Iranian Azerbaijani secularists who were frustrated with both religion and the Iranian government became the basis of Pan-Turkism and Pro-Turkey politics among Iranian Azerbaijanis. From 1993 to 1995, Turkey provided support to the KDPI and Komala. With the spread of Turkish media after the 2000s, nationalism increased among Iranian Azerbaijanis, with the Iranian government attempting to counter it. Tractor S.C. acted as a base for extreme nationalism, as well as racism particularly towards Persians and Kurds. Supporters also carry the flag of the Republic of Azerbaijan inside the stadium. In 2020, Suleyman Soylu claimed that there were 100 PKK fighters present in Iran with the tacit approval of the Iranian government.

=== Turkey ===
Before PJAK became a threat for Iran, the Iranian government was a staunch supporter of the PKK. However, the Turkish government accused Iran of continued support for the PKK in various forms of support. The Turkish government also alleged that Iran financed and trained the Kurdish Hezbollah, and accused Iran of planning to use the Kurdish Hezbollah against Turkey. In March 1993, after Abdullah Öcalan left Syria, the Turkish government accused Iran of organising a ceasefire between the Kurdish Hezbollah and PKK. A Turkish parliamentary report also revealed Kurdish Hezbollah operatives had trained in Iran. In 2023, the Free Cause Party, which is said to have ties to the Kurdish Hezbollah, ran candidates on the list of the Erdogan's Justice and Development Party.

Some Islamists in Turkey take pro-Iranian views against Turkish government. Felicity Party has been critical of Erdoğan and some elements of Turkish foreign policy in favor of Iran. Felicity Party supported Bashar al-Assad in Syria against American intervention. New Welfare Party has also been critical of Turkish government over Israel–Turkey relations. Many Pro-Iranian networks took pro-opposition stance during the 2025 Turkish protests and blamed Erdoğan.

Although the majority of Alevis in Turkey embraced secular values, were loyal to Turkey, and supported the Republican People's Party, Iran attempted to grow its influence over Alevis, while also attempting to convert them into the mainstream Twelver Shi'ism practiced in Iran, Iraq, Lebanon, Bahrain, and Azerbaijan. Some Turkish Alevi representatives had complained about Iran undermining Alevism. The Turkish government uncovered a secret plot by the Quds Force in June 2012. The investigation led the Turkish government to uncover a plot by the Quds Force and its assets, aiming to grow Iranian influence in Shia, Alevi, and ethnic Kurdish communities in Turkey. The plot aimed to religiously motivate the Shias and Alevis to start an uprising against Turkey. It also aimed to ethnically motivate the Kurds to start a separatist insurgency in Turkey. In both of these planned insurgencies, Iran would have provided support for the secessionists. Iranian attempts at converting Alevis to Shia Islam were also in the plot. In 2014, the Turkish government intervened in the case when senior aides of Erdoğan were involved in the plot.

Turkey and the United States are both members of NATO. Despite strained relations, they continued to cooperate against Iranian interests. Turkey supported various US policies against Iran, notably the assassination of Qasem Soleimani in Baghdad, in which Turkey secretly agreed to remove the Iranian obstacle to its ambitions.

=== Azerbaijan ===
In the 1990s, with the fall of the Soviet Union, Armenia and Azerbaijan declared independence from the Soviet Union. Iran and Turkey quickly recognized the independence of both countries, but Iran wanted to transform Azerbaijan into a similar theocratic Islamic regime, and it went so far as to try to fund the Azerbaijani armed forces and send men to fight for them in the Nagorno-Karabakh war. However, Azerbaijani leadership instead cooperated with Turkey and not Iran. In 1992, the Azerbaijanis elected Abulfaz Elchibey, whose pro-Turkish and anti-Iranian rhetorics alienated Iran. Turkey provided Azerbaijan with military equipment, as well as assisted Azerbaijan in the war with Armenia, while Turkish members of the Grey Wolves publicly participated in the First Nagorno-Karabakh War on the Azerbaijani side. Iran cooperated with Armenia and provided aid to Armenia and Artsakh.

Iranian activities in Azerbaijan since the end of the war have also been the subject of tensions between Iran and Turkey due to Azerbaijan's strong alliance with Turkey. Turkish and Azerbaijani support of Turkish nationalist separatism in Iranian Azerbaijan had been the source of tensions between Azerbaijan, Turkey and Iran. Iranian repressive policies towards Iranian Azeris often put relations between Iran and Turkey in question. The Iran-backed Husseiniyoun claimed that their goal was to repeat the Iranian revolution, but in Azerbaijan.

At the same time, after the victory of the Armenians in the war of the 1990s, Iran and Armenia became major trading partners while Armenia's relations with Turkey were hampered by the denial of the Armenian Genocide in Turkey. Iran was accused of preferring its Armenian minority over its Azerbaijani minority. Iran had frequently deployed trucks in the Karabakh region to assist Artsakh, drawing condemnation from Azerbaijan.

During the Second Nagorno-Karabakh War, Iran criticised Turkey, claiming that all Turkey did was add "fuel to the fire". Iran also criticised the presence of "terrorists" near its border, referring to alleged use of Syrian jihadists by Turkey and Azerbaijan in Nagorno-Karabakh. Iran arrested several pro-Azerbaijan activists in Iranian cities, including some Turkish citizens. On 12 December, Turkey summoned its Iranian ambassador due to the "aggressive" reaction from Iran to the poem read by Erdoğan. Iran boycotted Turkish products due to the poem. After the Second Nagorno-Karabakh War, Iranian influence in the South Caucasus diminished with Turkey emerging dominant. Turkey continued to work with Russia due to Russia's change in policy towards Azerbaijan, while Iran was left out. Iran was furious over Russia's policy shift on Zangezur corridor in favor of Azerbaijan. Senior adviser to the Supreme Leader of Iran Ali Akbar Velayati stated his opposition to the TRIPP (Donald Trump's version of the Zangezur corridor).

Iran suffered another blow after the US-backed peace plan between Armenia and Azerbaijan, Iran condemned the plan. Armenia and Iran signed ten agreements from infrastructure, culture, health, transport and tourism to pushback against the US and Turkish influence.

=== Pakistan ===
Pakistan had been a close ally and is a strategic partner of Turkey, and had tensions with Iran due to their support of opposing groups in the 1992-1996 Afghan Civil War, in which Iran supported the Northern Alliance while Pakistan supported the Taliban. Turkey supported the anti-Taliban Abdul Rashid Dostum, although it did not interfere with its good relations with Pakistan. After 2000, Iran attempted to lure Pakistani Shias to wars in Syria and Iraq against the Turkish interests, sparking outrage in Pakistan demanding that the Pakistani authorities investigate Iran's interference in the country. Pakistan also lodged complains to Iranian authorities over the usage of Indian consulate general in Zahedan, which Pakistani intelligence had suspected of India using it as an intelligence ground to conduct insurgent activities inside Pakistan. Pakistan was aligned with Turkish interests in the conflicts in the Caucasus and Syria.

=== Turkish claims on Iranian territory and borders ===
At a military parade in Azerbaijani capital, Baku, Turkey's President Erdoğan read from a poem that spoke of the division of the Aras River, separating Azerbaijan from Iran's ethnic Azerbaijani province. Iranian officials, including Foreign Minister Javid Zarif, condemned Erdoğan, saying his statement was pan-Turkish "irredentism" and an implicit claim on Iranian territory. In retaliation, Turkish officials labeled the Iranian reaction as "baseless" and "aggressive."

== Collaboration against Kurds ==
Turkey and Iran vowed to collaborate in their fight against Kurdish separatists in Iraq, as thousands of Turkish troops pressed ahead with an air and ground offensive against the militants in northern Iraq. Iranian Foreign Minister Ali Akbar Salehi claimed that the deaths of Turkish soldiers might have been avoided if the United States had informed Turkey that the terrorists were infiltrating into Turkey with heavy weaponry. The U.S. shares intelligence from surveillance drones with Turkey about movement of the PKK along the border.

The Turkish government shut down a probe, revealing connections between the Iranian Revolutionary Guard and the highest levels of the Turkish government.

A member of the Turkish parliament said that the 2011 Syrian uprising led Turkey to agree that they need Iran and Russia in order to stop a Kurdish state from forming on its southern border.

Hasan Arfa, the Iranian head of military intelligence who led most of the campaign against Simko and several other Kurdish separatists, stated that because he knew the Turks very well, he "wholly distrusts their assertions of friendship for Persia" and was aware that they "cast covetous eyes on Persian Azerbaijan." Arfa claimed that what stopped Turkey from annexing Iranian Azerbaijan was that Turkey was separated from Iranian Azerbaijan "by a corridor inhabited by Kurds who are always ready to fight the Turks" and who "for centuries been the frontier guards of Persia." Arfa claimed that the Turkish request for Iranian cooperation against Kurdish separatism was a way for Turkey to destroy the Iranian defense and easily take Iranian Azerbaijan afterwards. Arfa claimed that was why Iran did not want to fully destroy the Kurdish power on its borders.

== Trade relations ==
Turkey and Iran are members of the Economic Cooperation Organization

Iran and Turkey have very close trade and economic relations. Both countries are part of the Economic Cooperation Organization (ECO).

Bilateral trade between the nations is increasing. Between 2000 and 2005, this trade increased from $1 billion to $4 billion. Iran's gas export to Turkey is also likely to be increased. At present, the rate is at 50mm cm/d. Turkey imports about 10 billion cubic meters a year of gas from Iran, about 30 percent of its needs. Turkey plans to invest $12 billion in developing phases 22, 23 and 24 of South Pars gas field, according to a senior Iranian oil official Two-way trade is now in the range of $10 billion (2010), and both governments have announced that the figure should reach the $20 billion mark in the not too distant future. 50 percent of the gas from three phases of Iran's South Pars gas field will be re-exported to Europe. Turkey has won the tender for privatization of the Razi Petrochemical Complex, valued at $650 million (2008).

Iranian First Vice President Mohammad-Reza Rahimi announced in October 2012 that the speed of trade exchanges between Iran and Turkey has accelerated and was close to reaching the goal of $30 billion per year. He added that the growing trade relations between Tehran and Ankara indicate the two countries’ willingness to strengthen mutual ties. On 29 April 2019, Turkey and Iran highlighted their intentions of increasing cooperation in the aspect of transportation.

Turkey stopped buying Iranian oil completely in 2019 to comply with US sanctions.

On 17 December 2020, the Iranian Customs Administration announced the re-opening of the Bazargan border crossing in the northwest of Iran, which had shut down 3 months earlier due to the COVID-19 crisis. Iranian and Turkish trucks were again allowed to pass due to a significant decline of COVID cases in both countries. The closure of borders between the two countries caused a 70% decline in trade, which is now predicted to increase sharply.

In August 2023, Turkey's halt of oil flow through the Iraq-Turkey pipeline, following a legal dispute and compensation ruling, has led to economic, political, and legal consequences. Despite talks of resuming the pipeline, millions of barrels remain stuck, affecting global oil prices and destabilizing Iraq's economy, particularly the Kurdish region. The standoff risks regional instability, U.S. investments, and the rise of rival factions, potentially triggering civil conflict in both Iraqi Kurdistan and wider Iraq.

== Drug trade ==
Drugs are frequently illegal smuggled into Turkey from Iran through migrants. Turkey has attempted to mitigate the smuggling by building three meter high walls, security panels, towers and fences as well as placing sensors on its borders with Iran. The barriers were also placed to prevent terrorist activity from entering Turkey from Iran.

== Tourism ==
Iran and Turkey have extensive tourism relations for years. In 2017 a total of 2.5 million Iranian tourists visited Turkey, making the country as the favorite destination for holiday travelers. In turn Iran also benefits from Turkish tourism. As of 2013, tourists from Turkey comprise one of the largest that visit Iran, comprising 391,283 registered tourists.

== Resident diplomatic missions ==
- Iran has an embassy in Ankara and consulates-general in Istanbul, Erzurum and Trabzon.
- Turkey has an embassy in Tehran and consulates-general in Mashhad, Tabriz and Urmia.
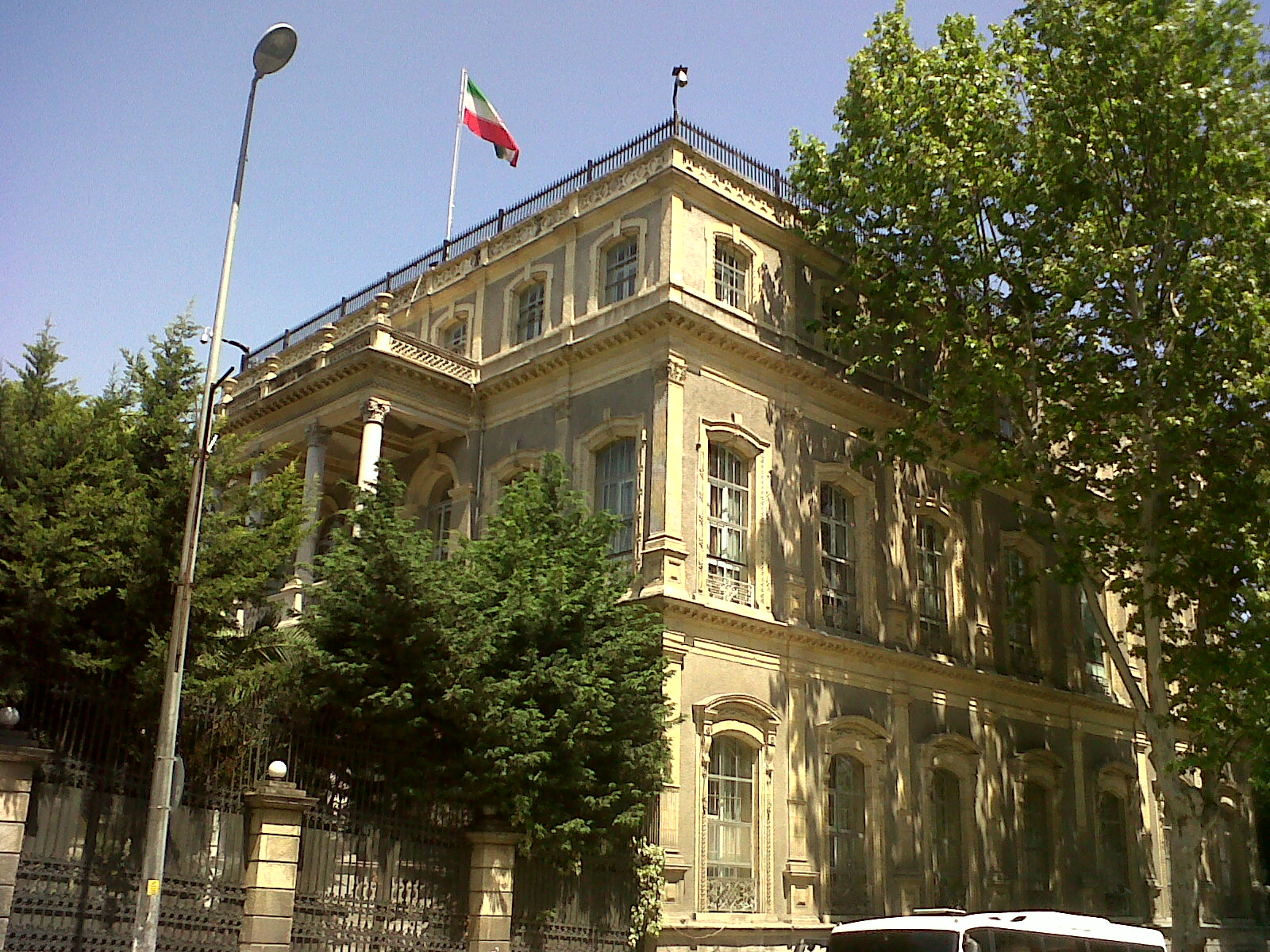
Consulate-General of Iran in Istanbul

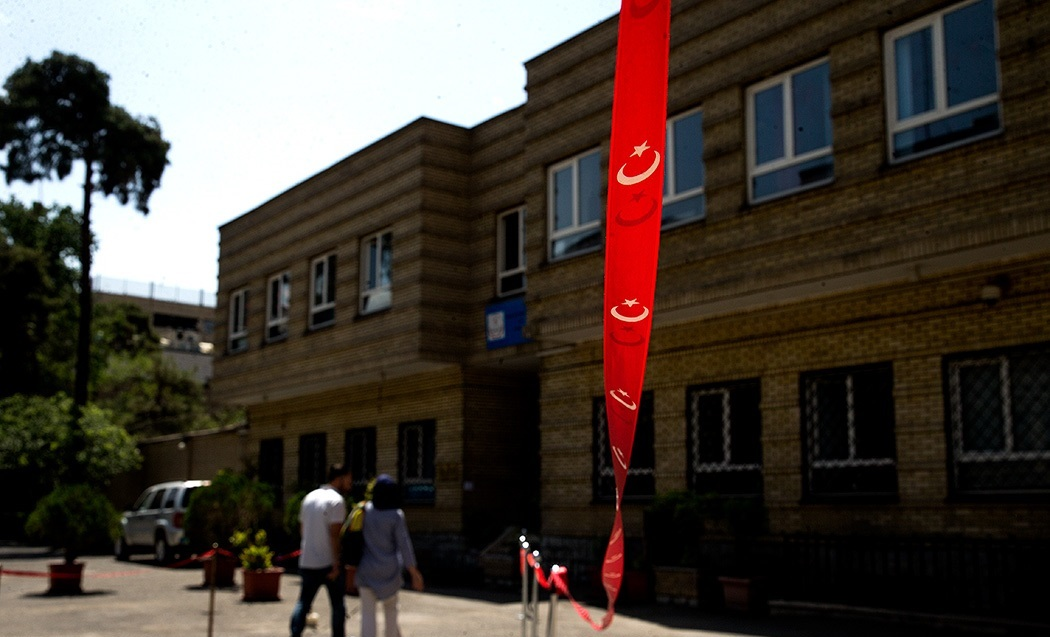
Embassy of Turkey in Tehran

== See also ==
- Shia–Sunni relations
- Central Treaty Organization
- Foreign relations of Iran
- Foreign relations of Turkey
- Ottoman-Persian Wars
