= Ahrar Sinjar =

Iraqi Yazidi militant group

- Founded: 2022
- Country: Iraq
- Active regions: Sinjar, Nineveh Plains, and Iraqi Kurdistan
- Ideology: Yazidi interests (claimed); Apoism (alleged); Anti-Turkish sentiment
- Conflicts: Shia militia attacks on Turkish forces in Iraq (2021–2022)

Ahrar Sinjar (Arabic: أحرار سنجار, lit. 'Liberators of Sinjar') are a Yazidi militant group affiliated with Iran-backed militias operating in northern Iraq. The group announced itself in 2022 with an attack on a Turkish base near Bashiqa.

== History ==
The first mention of Ahrar Sinjar was on February 3, 2022, in a statement claiming responsibility for a rocket attack on the Turkish base at Zilkan near Bashiqa, claiming that the "brave and fearsome men from Sinjar rose to fend off and stop Turkey’s aggression." Ahrar Sinjar was described as a "façade group" used to brand "resistance" attacks on Turkish targets and purportedly link the attacks to Yazidi grievances toward Turkey.

The logo of Ahrar Sinjar featured an image of Tawus Melek, and in a statement, the group claimed that its fighters were from the Yazidi city of Sinjar. It was thus seen as a Yazidi militia. Additionally, one of their military spokesmen was named Darman Tawus Melek, although Tawus Melek was considered a holy name for Yazidis and impermissible for humans to have the name. This led others to believe that the group was designed to persuade its audience that it was a Yazidi militia, but that those behind it were unlikely to be Yazidi or experts on the Yazidi culture and religion. Iran-backed militias were known to use "façade groups" such as Ahrar Sinjar as "brands" for specific attacks with the double aim of avoiding retaliation and maintaining deniability. Ahrar Sinjar was also seen as "a worrisome example of Iran-backed militias using minorities to undertake cross-border rocket attacks and build terrorist cells in the Kurdistan Region of Iraq" to attack Turkish and KRG targets.

Ahrar Sinjar claimed responsibility for four rocket and drone attacks against the Turkish base at Zilkan in 2022. On February 3, the group claimed a seventeen-round truck-based 122mm rocket attack on Zilkan in response to Turkish strikes on PMF 80th Brigade the prior night. On April 3, the group claimed another rocket attack on Zilkan, which could have been either or both the four-round 122mm rocket attack fired from Mosul and the seven-round truck-based 122mm rocket attack fired from the Nineveh Plains. The next day on April 4, they claimed a failed single rail-launched 122 mm rocket attack on Zilkan fired from the Nineveh Plains, seemingly a leftover rocket from the previous day which had not yet been fired. On May 21, they claimed a multi-drone (4-10 drones) attack on Zilkan, which killed one Kurdish civilian. The attack also allegedly killed two Turkish soldiers and a Turkish army contractor. While the strikes on the Turkish base were seemingly designed to appear convincing enough without risking major escalation or casualties, Turkey nevertheless responded forcefully, attacking several PMF targets, and the attacks by Ahrar Sinjar and allied groups mostly diverted onto targets less likely to respond, namely the US-led coalition and the KRG.

Weapons intelligence found at the truck launcher from April 3, 2022, matched with that of a January 15 attempted four-round 107mm rail-launched rocket attack from inside the Kurdistan Region on Zilkan. The timers also matched with a KRG intelligence video on May 16 showing an arrested group of Yazidis who brought 107mm rockets into the Kurdistan Region intending to strike dams, power stations and buildings, and two of the detainees claimed to have been trained on rockets by the PMF 53rd Brigade, and one of them claimed to have been trained by Kata'ib Hezbollah. The KRSC also added that all the Yazidi detainees had connections to the PKK, and one of the detainees had previously gathered intelligence for the PKK inside the Kurdistan Region. While the nature of the PKK-PMF collaboration at the time was unclear, an overlap of anti-Turkish and anti-KRG motives had been rising.

Groups connected with Ahrar Sinjar included Kata'ib Hezbollah, Asa'ib Ahl al-Haq, the PMF 53rd Brigade (Kata'ib Imam Hussein) and its Yazidi regiment (Lalish), the PMF 80th Brigade (YBŞ affiliated), and the PMF 30th Brigade (Shabak Brigade). Ahrar Sinjar was seen as a "façade group" affiliated with both Kataib Hezbollah and Asa'ib Ahl al-Haq.
