= Oğuz Gökmen =

Turkish diplomat and writer (1916–2007)

Personal details
- Born: 4 May 1916 Manisa, Ottoman Empire
- Died: 20 December 2007 (aged 91) Istanbul, Turkey
- Education: Ankara University; Sorbonne University

Oğuz Gökmen (1916–2007) was a Turkish writer and a career diplomat who served as the ambassador of Turkey in Argentina, Uruguay, Paraguay, Bolivia, West Germany, Yugoslavia and Hungary. He also published books on foreign relations of Turkey.

== Early life and education ==
He was born in Manisa on 4 May 1916. He graduated from Galatasaray High School in 1936. Then he received a degree in international relations from the Faculty of Political Sciences at Ankara University in 1940. He continued his studies at Sorbonne University and obtained a master's degree in 1948.

== Career and activities ==
Gökmen joined the Ministry of Foreign Affairs in 1940. He first worked as a second secretary and then, a chief secretary at the Turkish embassy in Paris, France. He mostly served in the economy-related departments at the Ministry and was the long-term directorate of the economic and social affairs department. He was the chargé d'affaires in Argentine and the undersecretary in Bulgaria. Then he served as the ambassador of Turkey to Argentina, Uruguay, Paraguay and Bolivia. He also served as the permanent delegate and ambassador of Turkey to the European Economic Community in Brussels. His next diplomatic posts included the ambassador of Turkey to West Germany, Yugoslavia and Hungary.

Following the military coup of 27 May 1960 which ended the rule of Democrat Party (DP) Gökmen, Hasan Esat Işık and Semih Günver who were close to Fatin Rüştü Zorlu, minister of foreign affairs in the DP cabinet, were dismissed from the Ministry. When they were cleared of all charges as a result of the investigations in 1962, they were appointed to new positions. Gökmen was named as the ambassador of Turkey to Argentina in November 1962.

Gökmen was among the Turkish participants of the 1975 Bilderberg Meeting in Çeşme.

Gökmen published the following books: Federal Almanya ve Türk İşçileri (1972; Turkish: Federal Republic of Germany and Turkish Workers), Türkiye Seyahatnamesi -1790 Yıllarında Türkiye ve İstanbul (1977; Turkish: Türkiye Travelogue - Türkiye and Istanbul in 1790), Bir Zamanlar Hariciye. Eski Bir Diplomatın Anıları (1999; Turkish: Once Upon a Time in Foreign Affairs. Memoirs of a Former Diplomat), and Diplomasi - Diplomaside 40 Yıl 11 Ay 17 Gün (2006; Turkish: Diplomacy - 40 Years 11 Months 17 Days in Diplomacy).

== Death ==
Gökmen died in Istanbul on 20 December 2007.
