= Muzaffer Göksenin =

Turkish diplomat and general

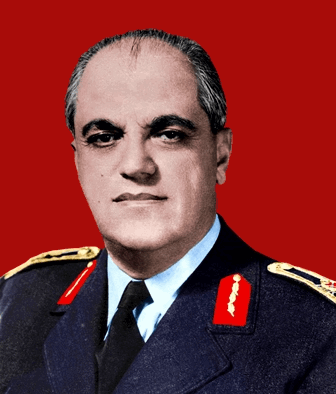
- Born: 1899; Manastir, Ottoman Empire
- Died: 31 January 1965 (aged 65–66); Istanbul, Turkey
- Education: Turkish Military Academy
- Military career
- Allegiance: Turkey
- Branch: Turkish Land Forces; Turkish Air Force
- Service years: 1916–1953
- Rank: General
- Units: World War I; Sinai and Palestine campaign; Turkish War of Independence; Greco-Turkish War
- Commands: Commander of Air Force
- Awards: See below

Muzaffer Göksenin (Manastir, Ottoman Empire, 1899 – Istanbul, 31 January 1965) was a Turkish soldier and diplomat. Göksenin is a retired general who served as the second Commander of the Turkish Air Force.

== Career ==
In 1916, at the age of 16, he was taken from Kuleli Military High School with his friends and joined the army in 1916 as a Cavalry Ensign. In 1917, the 26th division participated in the Palestine Campaign in the Cavalry Division. He was captured by the British around Damascus in October 1918 and returned to Istanbul after captivity. He went to Anatolia in 1920 and joined the national forces and served on the Western front in the Turkish War of Independence. He is among the "Nine Officers" who entered Izmir first among the cavalry units under the command of General Fahrettin Altay.

He was the architect of the establishment of the Turkish Air Force, which was established as an independent power at the end of the World War II, together with Lieutenant General Muzaffer Ergüder and General Zeki Doğan. He is the first Turkish commander to put into effect the modernization of the Turkish air fleet. Beginning in 1951, he made the transition from piston aircraft to jet aircraft. He founded the "Air Force Cooperative", which was first inspired by the PX and later formed the basis for the "Army Cooperative" (ORKO).

In 1953, as a result of a disagreement with the Turkish Minister of National Defense Seyfi Kurtbek, he asked for his retirement. Turkish Prime Minister Adnan Menderes invited him to return to the army again. He rejected this proposal of the Prime Minister and retired on 4 May 1953.

On 30 October 1954, Göksenin was appointed as the Ambassador of Turkey to Baghdad, where he was tasked with supporting the establishment of the Central Treaty Organization (CENTO). He was appointed as the Ambassador of Turkey to Pakistan in 1957. In January 1960, he was appointed as a Senior Adviser at the Ministry of Foreign Affairs, and later retired at his own request.

== Personal life ==
He was married and had two children.

== Death ==
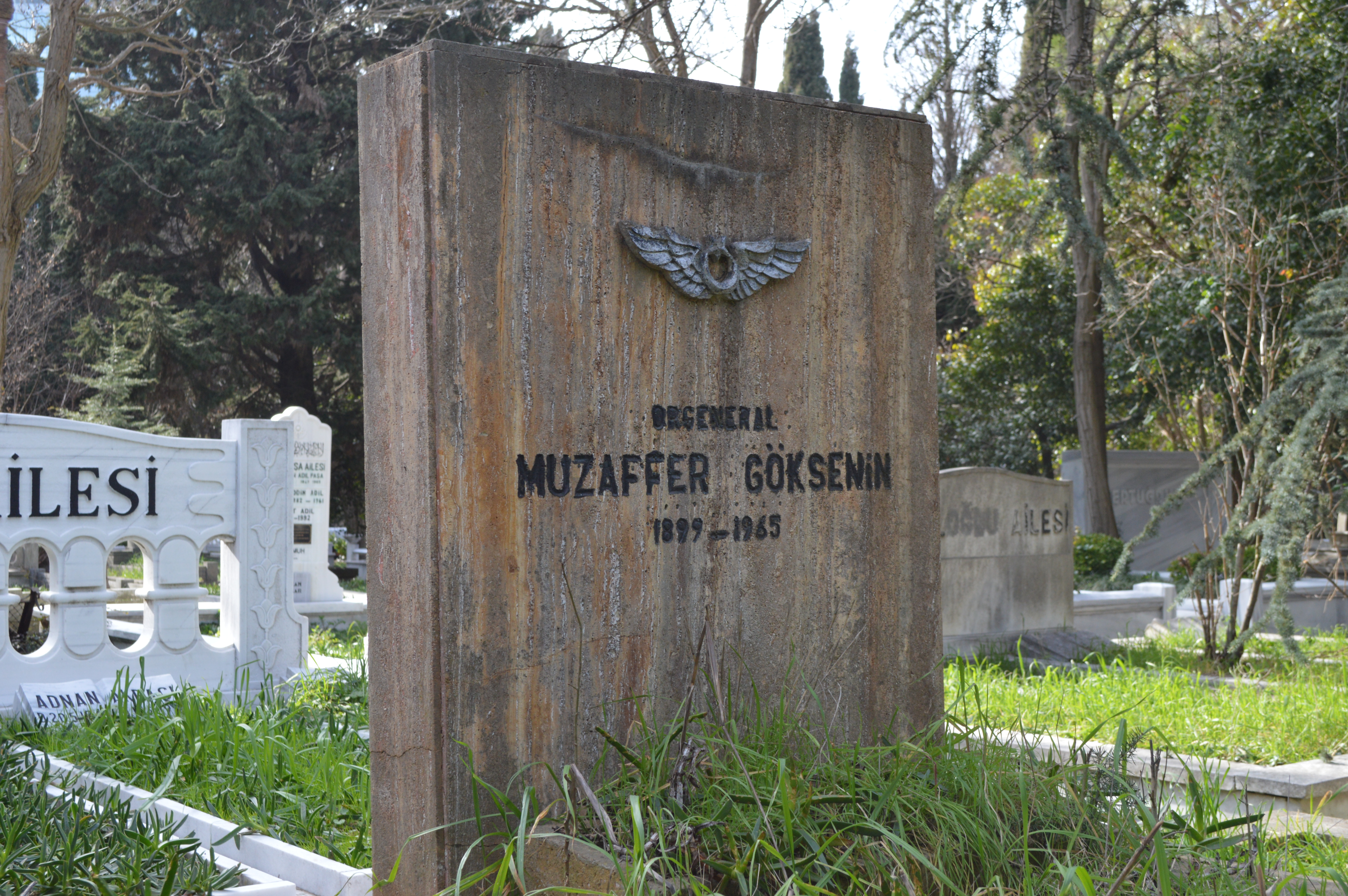
Grave of General Muzaffer Göksenin

Göksenin died on January 31, 1965, at the age of 66. His body was buried in Zincirlikuyu Cemetery in Istanbul.

== Awards and decorations ==
Göksenin was the recipient of the "Gallipoli Star (Turkish: Harp Madalyası)" and the "Red Stripe Medal of Independence".

Military offices
Preceded by Zeki Doğan	Commander of the Turkish Air Force; 12 June 1950 - 20 April 1953	Succeeded by Fevzi Uçaner
