= List of ambassadors of Turkey to Iraq =

Ambassador of Turkey to Iraq
- Incumbent; Ali Rıza Güney
- Ministry of Foreign Affairs; Embassy of Turkey in Baghdad
- Style: His Excellency
- Reports to: Minister of Foreign Affairs
- Appointer: President
- Inaugural holder: Tahir Lütfü Tokalp

The ambassador of Turkey to Iraq is the official representative of the president and the government of the Republic of Turkey to the president and government of Iraq.

== List of ambassadors ==
| Name | Term start | Term end | Ref. |
|---|---|---|---|
| Tahir Lütfü Tokalp | 1 January 1929 | 1 January 1939 | |
| Ahmet Cevat Üstün | 2 January 1939 | 1 January 1945 | |
| Nebil Bati | 2 January 1945 | 31 December 1948 | |
| Rahmi Apak | 1 January 1949 | 31 December 1952 | |
| Nedim Veysel İlkin | 23 April 1953 | 23 April 1953 | |
| Mehmet Naci Perkel | 27 November 1953 | 13 July 1954 | |
| Muzaffer Göksenin | 30 October 1954 | 19 April 1957 | |
| Behçet Türkmen | 29 March 1957 | 22 May 1959 | |
| Fuat Bayramoğlu | 8 May 1959 | 28 September 1960 | |
| Seyfettin Turagay | 28 September 1960 | 9 October 1964 | |
| Baha Vefa Karatay | 19 November 1964 | 19 January 1967 | |
| Emin Ali Binkaya | 26 January 1967 | 22 May 1968 | |
| Pertev Subaşi | 29 May 1968 | 18 July 1972 | |
| Nazif Çuhruk | 1 December 1972 | 3 October 1976 | |
| Sencer Asena | 9 August 1978 | 28 May 1982 | |
| Nüzhet Kandemir | 6 June 1982 | 1 October 1986 | |
| Sönmez Köksal | 25 September 1986 | 25 December 1990 | |
| Necati Utkan | 25 December 1990 | 31 December 1991 | |
| Sadi Çalişlar | 5 March 1993 | 3 January 1997 | |
| Selim Karaosmanoğlu | 31 December 1996 | 15 January 2001 | |
| Melih Mehmet Akat | 13 January 2001 | 5 January 2003 | |
| Osman Ali Feyyaz Paksüt | 29 December 2002 | 30 July 2004 | |
| Ahmet Ünal Çeviköz | 16 November 2004 | 1 January 2007 | |
| Derya Kanbay | 20 January 2007 | 1 October 2009 | |
| Murat Özçelik | 10 October 2009 | 1 November 2011 | |
| Yunus Demirer | 1 December 2011 | 17 September 2013 | |
| Faruk Kaymakcı | 3 November 2013 | 25 January 2017 | |
| Fatih Yıldız | 25 January 2017 | 1 May 2021 | |
| Ali Rıza Güney | 1 May 2021 | Present | |

== See also ==
- Iraq–Turkey relations
