= List of ambassadors of Turkey to the European Union =

The list of ambassadors of Turkey to the European Union comprises diplomats responsible for representing Turkey's interests within the European Union. The Permanent Delegation of Turkey to the EU has been active since 1963.

The Permanent Delegation initially used a building on Avenue Louise as its chancery until 1986. Between 1986 and 2011, the delegation shared a building on Rue Montoyer with Turkey's Embassy to Belgium and the consulate-general in Brussels. Reflecting Turkey's progress in EU accession negotiations, the Permanent Delegation moved to a larger, more modern building in May 2011.

== List of ambassadors ==
| # | Ambassador | Term start | Term end | Ref. |
|---|---|---|---|---|
| 1 | Oğuz Gökmen | 13 January 1964 | 30 November 1966 | |
| 2 | Ziya Müezzinoğlu | 1 January 1967 | 31 May 1971 | |
| 3 | Tevfik Saraçoğlu | 31 August 1972 | 25 July 1978 | |
| 4 | Cenap Yılmaz Keskin | 6 September 1978 | 1 November 1984 | |
| 5 | Pulat Yüksel Tacar | 14 November 1984 | 19 September 1987 | |
| 6 | Özdem Sanberk | 23 September 1987 | 1 July 1991 | |
| 7 | Cem Duna | 22 July 1991 | 17 January 1995 | |
| 8 | Uluç Özüker | 6 February 1995 | 16 February 1998 | |
| 9 | Nihat Akyol | 5 March 1998 | 18 July 2002 | |
| 10 | Oğuz Demiralp | 19 July 2002 | 10 December 2005 | |
| 11 | Volkan Bozkır | 15 December 2005 | 21 October 2009 | |
| 12 | Selim Kuneralp | 1 November 2009 | 9 December 2011 | |
| 13 | Selim Yenel | 13 December 2011 | 30 January 2017 | |
| 14 | Faruk Kaymakcı | 30 January 2017 | 24 January 2019 | |
| 15 | Mehmet Kemal Bozay | 24 January 2019 | 1 March 2023 | |
| 16 | Faruk Kaymakcı | 1 March 2023 | Present | |

== See also ==
- European Union
- Ministry of Foreign Affairs
- List of diplomatic missions of Turkey
