= Shia militia attacks on Turkish forces in Iraq (2021–2022) =

2021 Shia militia attacks on Turkey
- Part of the Iraqi conflict, the Iran–Turkey proxy conflict, the Kurdistan Workers' Party insurgency, and the Kurdistan Region–PKK conflict
Date	2021–2022
Location	Nineveh Governorate, Iraq
Result	Shia militias victory

Belligerents
(Iraq) Popular Mobilization Forces; Islamic Resistance in Iraq; Supported by: Iran	Turkey

The 2021 Shia militia attacks on Turkey were a series of attacks launched by various militias within the Popular Mobilization Forces and the Islamic Resistance in Iraq in 2021, targeting Turkey and its presence in Iraq. The attacks continued until 2022.

== History ==
In early 2021, Turkey launched Operation Claw-Eagle 2 against the PKK in Iraqi Kurdistan, sparking the reaction of Asa'ib Ahl al-Haq, which threatened military action against Turkey. Kata'ib Hezbollah also held protests outside the Turkish embassy. Turkey also threatened to invade Sinjar and threatened the PKK and its allies in the region. After the 2017 Iraqi–Kurdish conflict, Sinjar was captured by the Shia militias. The Shia militias were in a tactical alliance with the PKK and YBŞ. In addition to the large PMF and Shia militia presence in Sinjar, three more PMF brigades were sent to the region to bolster its fighters.

On 15 February, Ashab al-Kahf claimed responsibility for an airstrike on a Turkish base in Mosul, in retaliation for the operations against the PKK.

Kata'ib Hezbollah issued a statement threatening Turkey if it did not fully withdraw from Iraq and cease its operations. Harakat Hezbollah al-Nujaba and Badr Organization also threatened to attack Turkey. The militia hostility to Turkey was perceived as an indirect Iranian warning to Turkey against the PKK operations, with Turkish media claiming that Iran supported the PKK, and that Iran had relations with the PKK and the PUK to undermine the KDP and Turkey.

On 23 February, Iraj Masjedi, Iranian ambassador to Iraq, claimed that "Turkish forces should not pose a threat or violate Iraqi soil", and criticized Turkish presence in Iraq. On 27 February, Fatih Yıldız, Turkish ambassador to Iraq, stated that Masjedi should be "the last person to lecture Turkey about respecting borders of Iraq". As the Shia militias were coordinating various attacks on American presence in Iraq, they had limited resources. However, after the end of the US coalition mission in Iraq in December 2021, the militias began to attack Turkey on a larger scale.

In 2022, the Shia militia attacks on Turkish positions had quadrupled. The attacks were launched by many different Shia militias from different places. In April 2022, Turkey launched Operation Claw-Lock, causing more retaliatory militia airstrikes on Turkish bases, which increased between May and July 2022. The PKK announced a unilateral ceasefire after earthquakes in Syria, while the militias gradually targeted KRG oil pipes which led to Turkey. The Shabak Brigade launched a missile on a Turkish military base in Bashiqa, killing one Turkish soldier. After the show of force by the Shia militias, the Turkish government was seen as reluctant to engage the Shia militias. Mevlüt Çavuşoğlu did not refer to the Shia militias by name and only referred to them as "militias that support the PKK". The attacks were seen as a success of the Shia militias in deterring a Turkish intervention in Sinjar.
