= List of consuls general of Turkey in Shanghai =

The consul general of Turkey in Shanghai is the official representative of the Turkish government who resides in Shanghai to assist and protect Turkish citizens, and to promote and facilitate commercial and diplomatic relations between China and Turkey.

== List of consuls general ==
Name	Term start	Term end	Ref.
Murat Özçelik	2 January 1997	22 September 1998	
Akif Ayhan	22 September 1998	6 September 2002	
Tuncay İnkaya	30 September 2002	29 September 2006	
Murat Ülkü	30 September 2006	1 January 2011	
Deniz Eke	2 January 2011	15 September 2014	
Hüseyin Emre Engin	1 October 2020	Present	
