= Faruk Kaymakcı =

Turkish diplomat (born 1968)

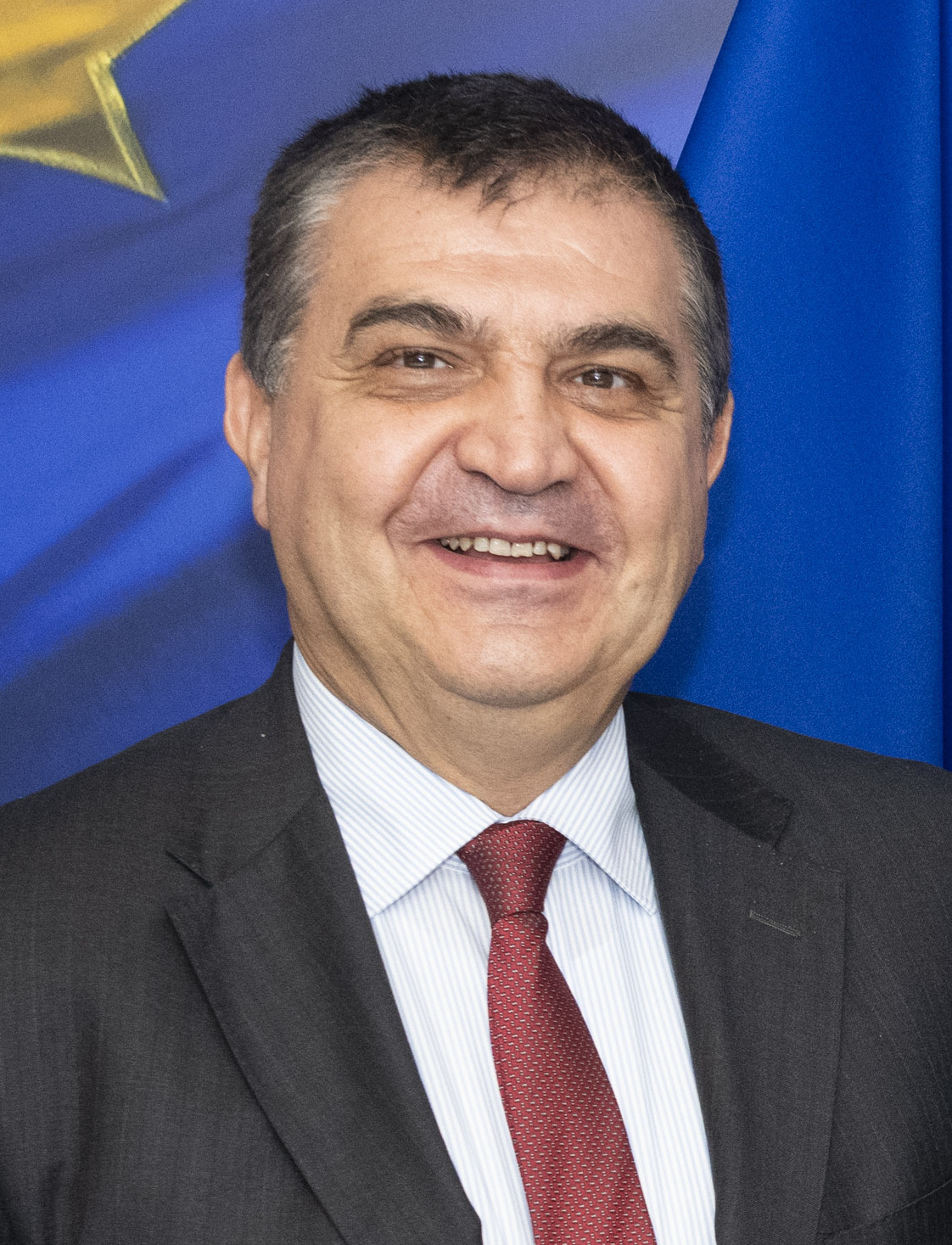

Permanent Representative of Turkey to the EU
- Incumbent
- Assumed office 1 March 2023
- Preceded by: Mehmet Kemal Bozay

Deputy Minister of Foreign Affairs
- In office August 2018 – February 2023
- President: Recep Tayyip Erdoğan
- Minister: Mevlüt Çavuşoğlu

Ambassador of Turkey to Iraq
- In office 3 November 2013 – 25 January 2017
- Preceded by: Yunus Demirer
- Succeeded by: Fatih Yıldız

Personal details
- Born: March 21, 1968 (age 58) Tosya, Kastamonu
- Education: University of Ankara; London School of Economics; College of Europe
- Profession: Diplomat

Faruk Kaymakcı (born March 21, 1968, in Tosya) is a Turkish diplomat who is currently serving as the permanent representative of Turkey to the European Union. Previously, he served as the Deputy Minister of Foreign Affairs of Turkey and as the ambassador of Turkey to Iraq.

== Education ==
Kaymakcı holds double master's degrees in economics (from London School of Economics) and politics of the European Union (from the College of Europe), He obtained both MSCs after receiving his Economics graduate degree from the Economics department of the faculty of political Science of Ankara University. He also did EU studies at the University of Strasburg in France.

== Diplomatic career ==
Before ascending and serving as Turkish deputy minister of foreign affairs and director for EU affairs between August 2018 and February 2023, He first served as the civilian adviser to Hikmet Çetin (then Minister of foreign affairs) after joining the ministry in 1994, Kaymakcı then served at the office directorate general for international economic organizations, DG Balkan states between 1994 and 1996.

He left for Lebanon in 1997 and served at the Turkish embassy in Tripoli until 1999. He joined the Turkish permanent delegation to the EU in Brussels thrice, first from 1999 to 2002, then, between 2005 and 2008 and thirdly, from 2017 to 2018.

He worked at the office of the directorate general of policy planning at the Ministry of foreign affairs in Ankara for about one year after his first experience in Brussels before leaving for Afghanistan in 2004 where he worked at the NATO senior civilian representative's office in Kabul until 2005. He was the Chief Foreign Policy Advisor to Türkiye's EU Minister and Chief Negotiator and Director for EU Communication at the EU Ministry for about 2 years from 2009 and served as the Consul General of Turkey in Basrah from 2011 to 2013 when he was appointed to serve as ambassador of Turkey in Iraq from 2013 to 2017 in which time the Turkish state completed the purchase of the Embassy building in Baghdad.

Kaymakcı was appointed deputy minister of foreign affairs and head of EU affairs during his third term in Brussels and was reappointed as Ambassador, permanent delegate of Turkey to the EU on March 1, 2023, and replaced by Ambassador Mehmet Kemal Bozay who became the deputy minister of foreign affairs and head of EU affairs. He speaks English and French.
