= Undersecretariat of Public Order and Security =

Former governmental intelligence organization of Turkey

- Kamu Düzeni ve Güvenliği Müsteşarlığı
- KDGM logo

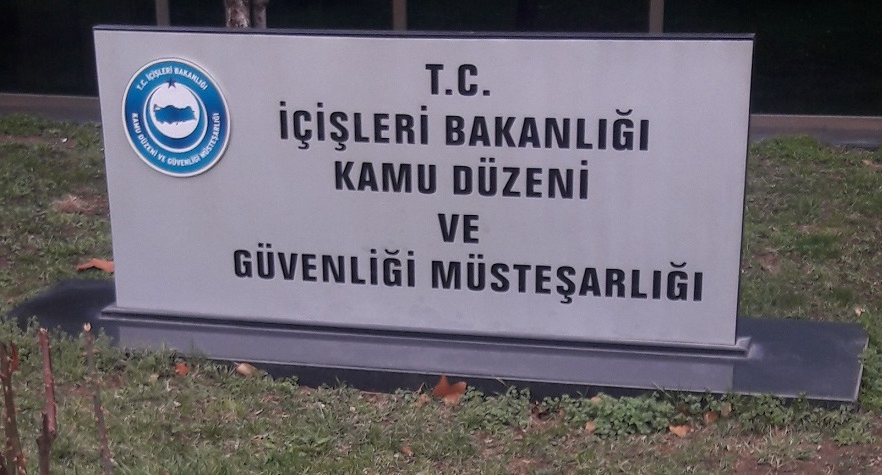
- Entrance of Undersecretariat of Public Order and Security in Ankara, Turkey.

Agency overview
- Formed: May 2010
- Dissolved: 9 July 2018
- Jurisdiction: Government of Turkey
- Headquarters: Çankaya, Ankara

The Undersecretariat of Public Order and Security of the Ministry of the Interior (Turkish: Kamu Düzeni ve Güvenliği Müsteşarlığı; KDGM) was the governmental intelligence organization of Turkey.

KDGM was structured as an organization to plan combat against terrorism with a multidimensional and holistic approach and effectively coordinate by also considering social values and dynamics, to play a pioneering role in minimizing terrorism through its policies and strategies, who adopts superiority of law and respect to basic rights and freedoms as principles. KDGM has begun its works with a proactive approach to produce projects which are open to cooperation, solution-oriented, mindful for accurate and effective communication and socially responsible.

It was closed on July 9, 2018, and all rights and obligations were transferred to the Ministry of Interior.
