= Fatih Yıldız =

Turkish diplomat (born 1971)

Ambassador of Turkey to Iraq
- In office 25 January 2017 – 1 May 2021
- Preceded by: Faruk Kaymakcı
- Succeeded by: Ali Rıza Güney

Ambassador of Turkey to Sudan
- Incumbent
- Assumed office 26 August 2024
- Preceded by: Ismail Çobanoğlu

Personal details
- Born: 1971 (age 54–55) Ankara, Turkey

Fatih Yıldız (born 1971 in Ankara) is a Turkish diplomat who served as the ambassador of Turkey to Iraq from 2017 to 2021.

== Career ==
Yıldız graduated from the Middle East Technical University in 1994 with a degree in international relations and entered the Ministry of Foreign Affairs in the same year.

Yıldız started his career working as a second and first secretary in the office of the ministry undersecretary Uğur Ziyal. He then served as first secretary and counselor in the Embassy of Turkey in Washington, D.C. before returning to Ankara to work in the HR department of the Foreign Ministry.

In 2010 Yıldız was appointed as Consul General to Chicago. In 2014 he returned to the HR department to serve as its Head. On 25 January 2017, Yıldız was appointed as the ambassador of Turkey to Iraq. He returned to the headquarters on 1 May 2021.

During his tenure as the ambassador to Iraq, Yıldız made numerous appearances on Iraqi media regarding Iranian actions in Iraq and Turkey's military presence in northern Iraq.

On 26 August 2024, he was appointed ambassador to Sudan.

== Personal life ==
He is married and a father of one daughter.
