= Battle of Rashaya =

Military battle in 1925

- Part of The Great Syrian Revolt
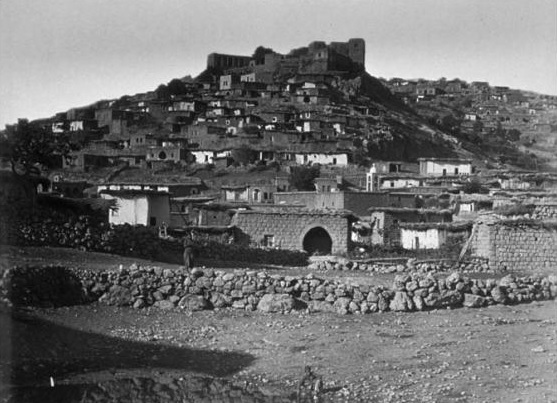
- The village of Rashaya with its citadel, where the battle was fought, late 19th century
Date	20–24 November 1925
Location	Rashaya, Greater Lebanon, Mandate for Syria and the Lebanon
Result	French victory

Belligerents
France: Army of the Levant; French Foreign Legion	Druze rebels

Commanders and leaders
(France) Capt. Landriau	Zayd al-Atrash

Strength
100 cavalry	~3,000

Casualties and losses
58 dead and wounded	~400 dead 34 wounded

The Battle of Rashaya was a four-day battle fought at the citadel of Rashaya on 20 – 24 November 1925 between Druze rebels and the French Army of the Levant during the Great Syrian Revolt against French Mandatory rule.

== Prelude ==
Following the heavy bombardment of Damascus by the French following the rebels' brief capture of the city led by Hasan al-Kharrat and Nasib al-Bakri on 18 October, the stronghold of rebel resistance moved back to the Ghouta, Damascus's immediate countryside. On 26 October, Zayd al-Atrash, a Druze rebel commander and brother of rebel leader Sultan al-Atrash, attempted to lead a foray into the Maydan quarter of Damascus, but withdrew after Maydani notables urged him to retreat for fear of further French bombardment. Meanwhile, fighting took place across the eastern suburbs of Damascus, with French forces consisting of troops from the French Foreign Legion, Circassian cavalry and Moroccan spahi units looting numerous villages and estates in the region, contributing to the fledgling morale of Syrian Arab nationalists in Damascus. However, with the uptick in peasants made homeless by the French assaults on the villages, the number of recruits into the various rebel bands swelled.

By November, rebel forces were in firm control of the region immediately north of the Ghouta plain, including the Anti-Lebanon Mountains region as far north as an-Nabk, and the eastern slopes of Mount Hermon, which marked the southwestern end of the Anti-Lebanon range. In the latter region, Zayd began preparing Druze peasants for an offensive against southern Lebanon. Zayd's intent was to establish a direct link with the Druze of Mount Lebanon and thus expand the revolt westward, thereby cutting the French links between Damascus and the port cities of Lebanon, including the Beirut–Damascus railway. On 9 November, Zayd's forces captured Hasbaya in Wadi al-Taym region just west of Mount Hermon in the southern Lebanon. The next day, they took control of Kawkaba, where they killed several of its Maronite inhabitants. Zayd also took control of Marjayoun.

The anti-French revolt's expansion into Lebanon and stories of massacres targeting local Christians sparked worry among the Christians of southern Lebanon. It also caused consternation among the French Mandatory authorities, who feared that the brewing anti-French uprising by the Druze and Shia Muslims of southern Lebanon could generate into a sectarian civil war throughout Lebanon. On 5 November, French Foreign Legion cavalrymen established a headquarters in the fort of Rashaya. The 100-strong Foreign Legion unit stationed there was the 4th Squadron of the 1st Cavalry Regiment, commanded by Captain Landriau. At the time, Rashaya was a relatively large village of 3,000 inhabitants. The fort was small, partially-ruined and situated atop a hill overlooking the town. French reconnaissance flights determined that Zayd's forces, numbering some 3,000 Druze fighters, were assembling near the village. The French headquarters' defenses were bolstered, while regular French army patrols were dispatched around the town. On 18 November, two French units were ambushed by Zayd's men, resulting in two killed, three wounded and three missing in action.

== Battle ==
On 20 November, Zayd and his fighters opened heavy fire against French positions in Rashaya from the surrounding hilltops. As night fell, the rebels breached the defenses and captured part of the fortress. They were forced to withdraw by French resistance, but returned during the day with reinforcements. Heavy fighting ensued within the fortress walls for three days until a French bayonet charge forced the rebels back behind the fortress's perimeter. Combat during the battle was marked by a lot of hand-to-hand fighting. Dead and wounded men from both sides and camel and horse carcasses straddled the perimeter in the aftermath of the fighting after three days.

After pushing back the rebels, the French garrison sent carrier pigeons to appeal for assistance from the French military command in the region. By then, forty to fifty men of Landriau's squadron had been killed or wounded and the rest of the unit had not slept for three consecutive nights. With the grenades in his squadron's arsenal depleted and ammunition mostly run out (about fifteen rounds per soldier was left), Landriau decided to launch a "Camerone-style charge" (faire Camerone) against the rebels as a last-ditch effort to break the siege. "Camerone-style" is in reference to the 1863 Battle of Camerone between the French Foreign Legion and the Mexican army. This desperate tactic entailed French soldiers fixing bayonets on their rifles and launching a desperate charge against the enemy, in this case Zayd's men. Landriau instructed each of his men to keep at least one round available to commit suicide should they be in danger of capture because he believed that his soldiers would be heavily tortured in captivity. Before Landriau could carry out his "Camerone-style" charge, French planes bombed the rebels gathering around the fortress's walls and a French relief column of the 6th Spahi Regiment intervened. Zayd's forces thereafter retreated into the Anti-Lebanon Mountains.

== Aftermath ==
By the battle's end, about 400 of Zayd's rebels were killed and 34 were confirmed wounded. Landriau's 4th Squadron's losses amounted to 58 dead and wounded. Armed engagements between the French and Druze rebels continued in the Mount Hermon region, particularly in Mas'ade and Majdal Shams, through the remaining weeks of 1925. On 5 December, French forces bombarded Hasbaya from the air and recaptured the village. Hasbaya and Rashaya marked the furthest significant expansion of the Great Syrian Revolt into Lebanon. Rebel activity continued in Lebanon, but by the end of 1925, no major rebel bands still operated. As a result of his perceived mishandling of the rebel capture of Damascus and the immediate aftermath, the French High Commissioner, General Maurice Sarrail was recalled to France and replaced by a civilian politician, Henry de Jouvenel. The rebels' defeat at Rashaya marked a turning point in the revolt in favor of the French. By the spring of 1926, the rebels in Syria were largely defeated. Sporadic clashes between the rebels and French continued through the summer of 1927, but there had been no major engagements.

== Bibliography ==
- Bidwell, Robin (1998). Dictionary Of Modern Arab History. Routledge. ISBN 9781136162985.
- Kahana, Ephraim; Muhammad, Suwaed (2009). The A to Z of Middle Eastern Intelligence. The Scarecrow Press, Inc. ISBN 9780810870703.
- Khoury, Phillip S. (1987). Syria and the French Mandate: The Politics of Arab Nationalism, 1920–1945. Princeton University Press. ISBN 9781400858392.
- Lepage, Jean-Denis G. G. (2008). The French Foreign Legion: An Illustrated History. McFarland & Company, Inc. ISBN 9780786462537.
- Windrow, Martin (2010). Our Friends Beneath the Sands: The Foreign Legion in France's Colonial Conquests 1870-1935. Orion Books. ISBN 9780297858416.
- Windrow, Martin; Roffe, Michael (1971). The French Foreign Legion. Osprey Publishing. ISBN 9781472806369.
