= Nasib al-Bakri =

Syrian politician and nationalist leader

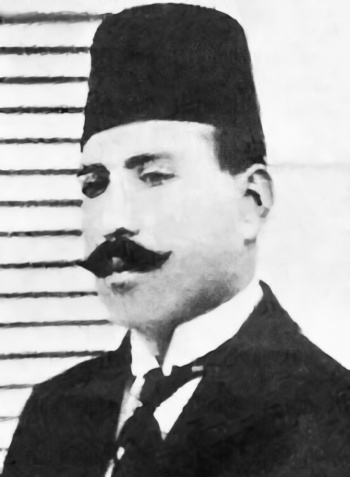
- Bakri, early 1920s

Minister of Justice
- In office 24 February 1939 – 5 April 1939
- President: Bahij al-Khatib
- Prime Minister: Lutfi al-Haffar
- Preceded by: Abd al-Rahman al-Kayyali
- Succeeded by: Khalid al-Azm

Minister of National Economy and Agriculture
- In office 4 April 1941 – 21 September 1941
- President: Hashim al-Atassi
- Prime Minister: Khalid al-Azm

President of the People's Party
- In office 1954 – April 1957
- Preceded by: Nazim al-Kudsi
- Succeeded by: Maarouf al-Dawalibi

Parliamentary Deputy of Damascus
- In office 1932–1946

Personal details
- Born: 1888 Damascus, Ottoman Empire
- Died: 1966 (aged 77–78)
- Party: National Bloc (1928–1946); People's Party (1946 – April 1957)

Nasib al-Bakri (Arabic: نسيب البكري; 1888–1966) was a Syrian politician and nationalist leader in the first half of the 20th century. He played a major role in establishing al-Fatat, an underground organization which sought the independence and unity of the Ottoman Empire's Arab territories. As the chief envoy between al-Fatat and the Hejaz-based Hashemites, al-Bakri became a close aide to Emir Faisal when the latter became King of Syria following the success of the 1916 Arab Revolt. Al-Bakri opposed the establishment of the French Mandate of Syria and became one of the chief commanders of the Great Syrian Revolt, leading the rebels' brief capture of Damascus. He escaped a death warrant in Syria in 1927, but returned the following year after being amnestied.

Al-Bakri served as a representative of Damascus in the Syrian Parliament between 1932 and 1946. He was one of the main coordinators of the 1936 general strike and became Vice President of the National Bloc. He defected to join Abd al-Rahman Shahbandar's party in 1938. During the post-independence period, al-Bakri was appointed Syria's ambassador to Jordan but resigned in 1953 in protest against Adib al-Shishakli's seizure of power. The following year, he became President of the People's Party, but retired in 1957.

== Early life ==
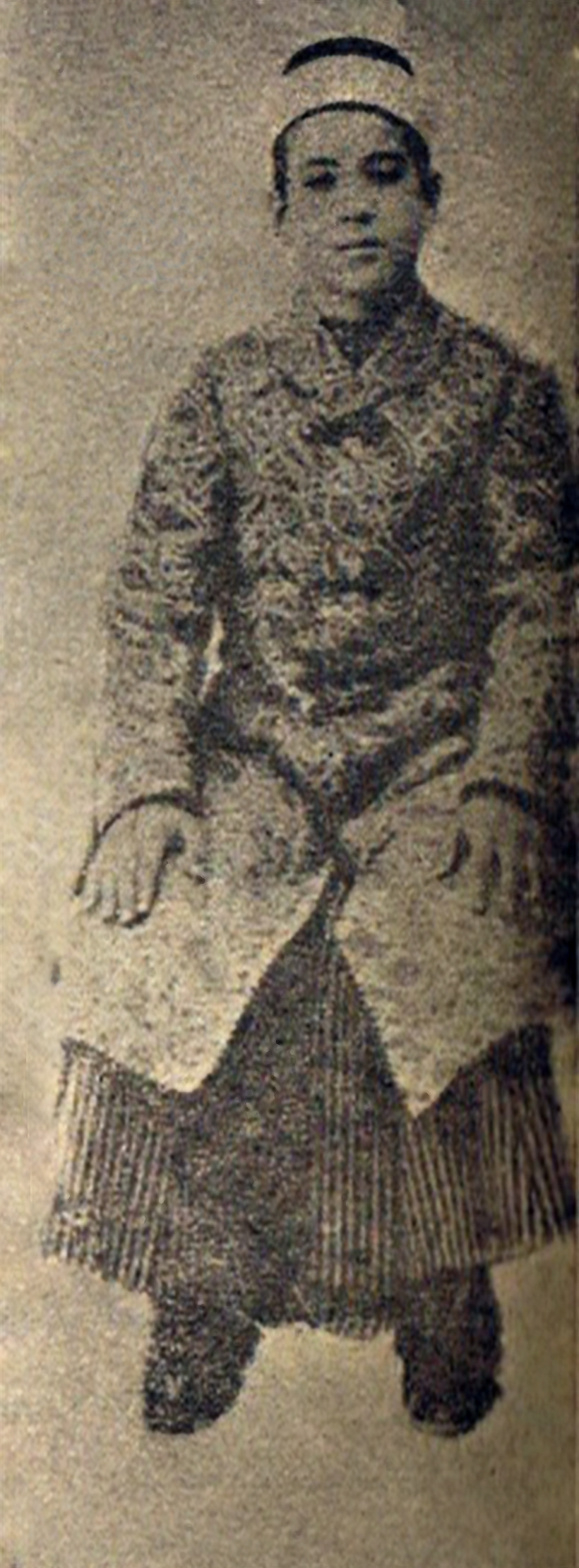
Al-Bakri as a pupil at the Rihaniya School in the 1890s

Nasib was born in Damascus in 1888 to father 'Ata al-Bakri. Nasib was the second oldest of five sons. 'Ata was an influential official in the city and district councils of Damascus between the 1890s and 1914, and was one of the most prominent Arabs to serve in the imperial Ottoman court of Sultan Abdul Hamid II in Constantinople. The al-Bakri family traced their descent from Abd al-Rahman ibn Abi Bakr through their ancestor Mustafa ibn Kamal al-Din al-Bakri. They were landowners, possessing lands, homes and commercial venues in their native al-Shaghour quarter and in Qaboun, a village in the Ghouta countryside of Damascus. They also owned land in Jaramana, a Druze village outside of Damascus and maintained good relations with the local Druze chiefs.

When Abdul Hamid II was overthrown during the Young Turk Revolution in 1908, 'Ata lost his favor from the central authorities because of his closeness with the deposed sultan and criticized the revolutionary officers. Consequently, the al-Bakri family realigned itself with Arab nationalists in Syria who opposed the increased Turkish nationalist efforts in the Arabic-speaking territories of the empire. 'Ata had also developed close ties with the Hashemites of the Hejaz. In 1909 he hosted the Sharif of Mecca, Hussein bin Ali, his brother Nasir, and Abdullah, Sharif Hussein's son, in his Damascus home.

Nasib attended Maktab Anbar, a preparatory school in Damascus that attracted the children of the elite and produced several future Arab nationalists. In 1912, Nasib graduated from the al-Sultaniya School of Beirut. When Sharif Hussein's son, Faisal, visited Syria in early 1916, he lodged in the al-Bakris' summer house in Qaboun, outside of Damascus. Prior to this, Nasib and his brothers Fawzi and Sami had joined the budding al-Fatat movement, an underground society advocating Arab independence from the Ottomans. Nasib had become the movement's secretary.

== Leader in Syrian independence movement ==
=== Ally of the Hashemites ===
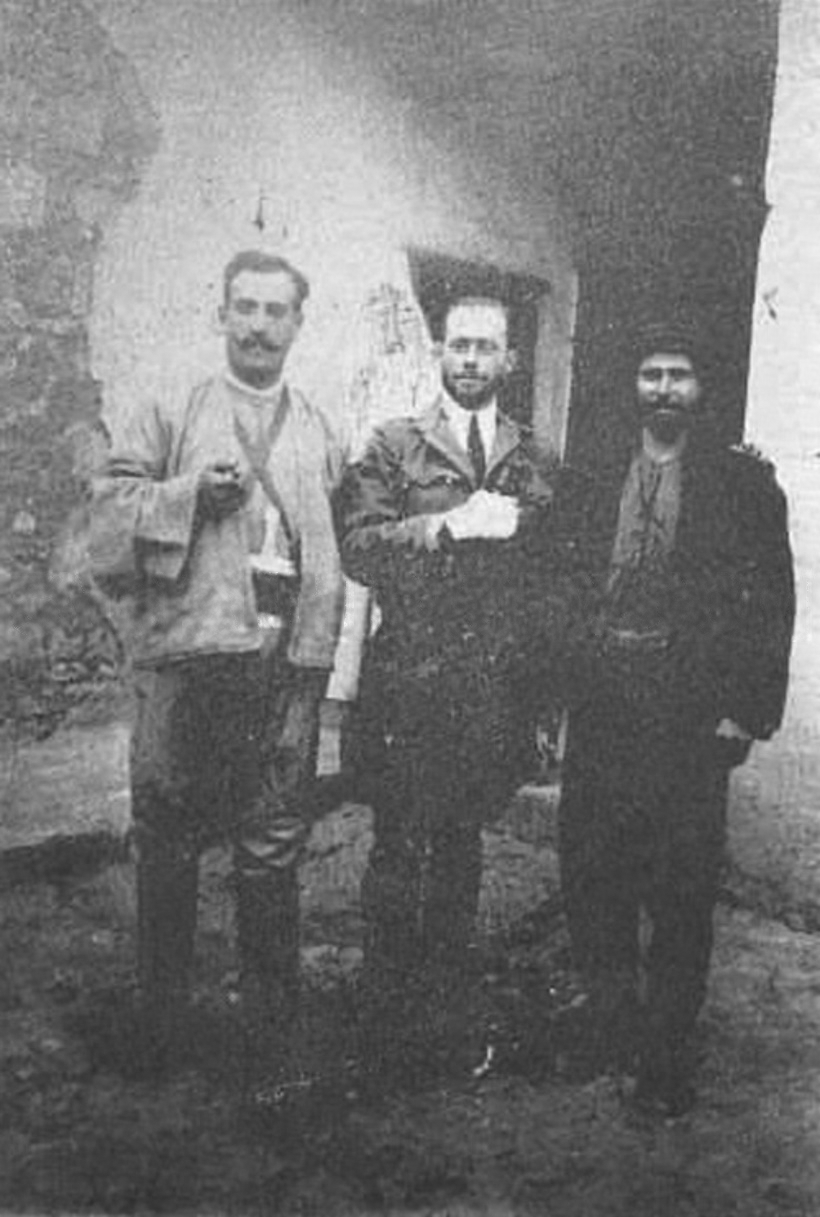
Al-Bakri (left) with rebel commander Fawzi al-Qawuqji (center) during the 1925 Hama uprising

In 1915, Nasib hosted Faisal at his Ghouta country house and invited him join al-Fatat, which he reportedly agreed to. At the same time, al-Bakri organized a meeting between him, some members of al-Fatat, and the Druze chiefs of the Hauran, Hussein and Sultan al-Atrash with the intention of gaining Druze support for the planned Arab rebellion against the Ottomans (the Druze had launched several uprisings against the Ottomans prior). The meeting concluded with the Druze offering Faisal and the nationalists their backing, though short of any military support. The meeting was the first of its kind between the Hashemites and the Druze, and afterward Faisal appointed al-Bakri to be his personal secretary and his envoy to the Druze, a post he would serve until 1920.

In the summer of 1916, amid World War I, Sharif Hussein launched the Great Arab Revolt against the Ottomans from Mecca with the backing of the British military. Al-Bakri joined the revolt and moved to the Hejaz where he served as a channel between al-Fatat based in Damascus and the Hashemite forces leading the uprising. When the Ottomans were defeated in 1918 and Arab and British forces reached Damascus, Faisal would soon become the King of Syria and al-Bakri served as one of his advisers. The next year al-Bakri co-founded the first legal political party in Faisal's Syria, the pan-Arabist al-Istiqlal ("Independence") which sought to unify all the former Ottoman-held Arab territories under the leadership of the Hashemites. During this period until 1920, al-Bakri was a member of the Syrian National Congress as a representative of Damascus.

France invaded and began occupying Syria in 1919 and following the Battle of Maysalun in July 1920, Faisal was exiled and the kingdom annulled. Al-Bakri left for Amman in Transjordan, which was under the authority of Faisal's brother King Abdullah. Al-Bakri would later serve as Abdullah's aide in 1921, a position he held for about two years before returning to Syria after the French issued amnesty for political exiles. On his return, he became a member of al-Shahbandar's People's Party and actively sought to topple the French authorities in Syria and align the country with the ruling Hashemites in Iraq, Transjordan and the Hejaz. The Hashemites were driven out of the latter in 1925 by the Saudis.

=== Role in Great Syrian Revolt ===
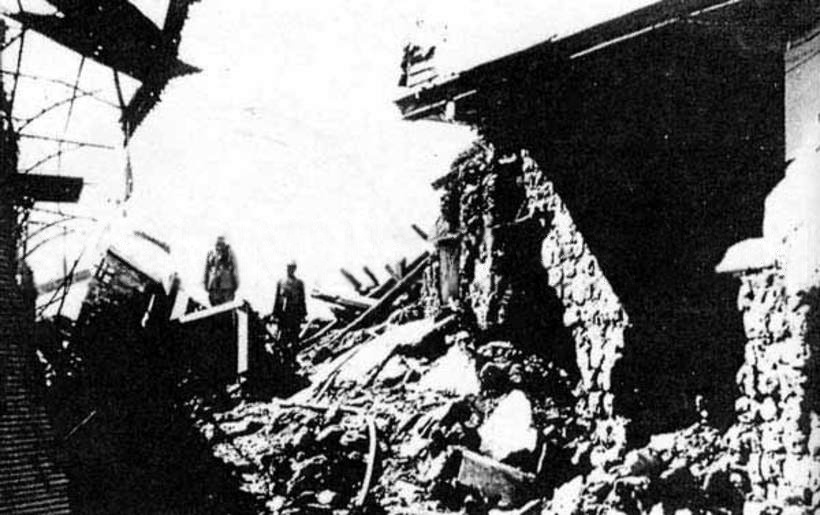
Al-Bakri's home after its destruction by the French during the nationwide revolt of 1925

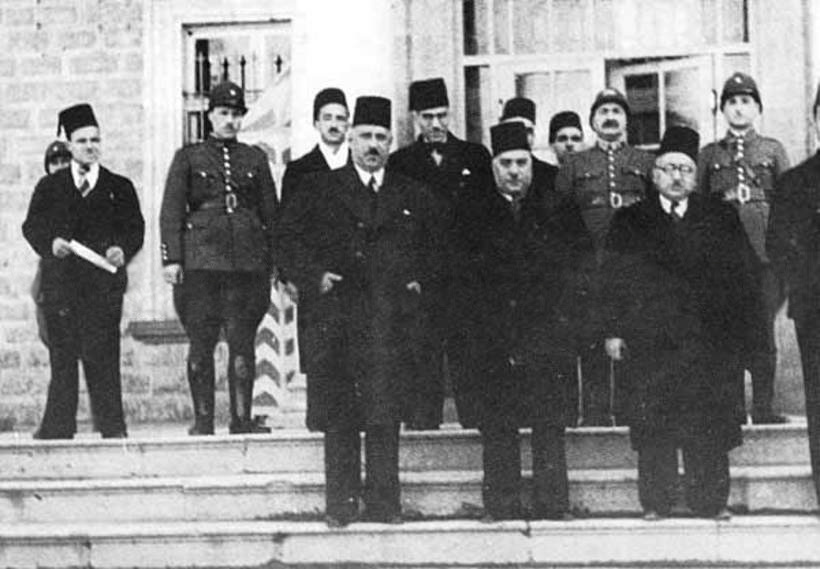
Prime Minister Lutfi al-Haffar at the Sarail on 23 February 1939. Al-Bakri is standing in the front row, first from the left

The summer of 1925 also saw the beginning of the Great Syrian Revolt, launched by Sultan Pasha al-Atrash in the Jabal al-Arab region in southern Syria. After Atrash's men destroyed a French column at al-Kafr, al-Bakri received a letter from al-Atrash on 23 July calling on the nationalists in Damascus to join the revolt; al-Bakri subsequently joined. Following the French defeat at the Battle of Mazraa on 3 August, al-Bakri began working with Abd al-Ghaffar al-Atrash, the Druze chief of al-Suwayda, to advance the revolt to other parts of the country outside of Hauran. Al-Bakri set up a meeting between the Damascus-based nationalists and Sultan al-Atrash at his home in Qaboun, after which the two sides agreed to work together to uproot the French from Syria.

Following the meeting, al-Bakri conferred with al-Shahbandar, who agreed to bring Damascus into the revolt, although this initial attempt did not materialize. As al-Atrash's men headed towards Damascus to launch their attack against French forces there, al-Bakri assembled some 260 armed volunteers from various neighborhoods and villages in and around Damascus, including al-Shaghour, Bab Musalla, al-Midan, and Jaramana. Al-Bakri maintained particularly close ties to Hasan al-Kharrat, the local boss (qabaday) of al-Shaghur and a friend of the al-Bakri family. In early August, upon al-Bakri's urging, al-Kharrat formed a militia, which would become one of the most effective rebel bands in the country. When the French authorities were informed of nationalist rebel plans, they began a wide-scale arrest campaign in the city on 27 August, detaining nearly all of Damascus's nationalist leaders and spokesmen, although al-Bakri, his brothers, and al-Shahbandar managed to evade arrest.

He participated in attacks alongside Druze warriors against French positions and offices in the Hauran, and of all the rebel commanders from Damascus, al-Bakri was the most respected among the Druze. As fighting between rebels and French forces in the Ghouta escalated, al-Bakri devised an operation to wrest control of Damascus from the French by capturing the citadel and the Azm Palace. The former housed the city's French garrison, while the latter housed the French Mandate High Commissioner Maurice Sarrail. Al-Bakri requested reinforcements from al-Atrash and his men, but they were occupied by fighting in the Hauran and notified al-Bakri that any help would be delayed. Al-Bakri decided to move ahead nonetheless. On 17 October, he assembled al-Kharrat's group and another group of rebels from al-Midan and Jaramana inside Damascus. The next day al-Kharrat launched the operation.

While al-Kharrat's men managed to capture the Azm Palace and the police station in Bab Saghir, al-Bakri led a band of 200 fighters from their base in al-Midan to raid an Armenian refugee camp in al-Qadam, killing several Armenian refugees. The rebels accused the Armenians—who along with the Circassians were typically allied with the French authorities—of participating in the French military assaults against several Ghouta villages in the preceding weeks. After attacking al-Qadam, al-Bakri's forces swept through the city, capturing the police stations at Bab al-Jabiyah, Bab Musalla and Qanawat. With each captured neighborhood, their forces increased in size as enthusiastic bystanders joined in the attacks.

Sarrail, who was not in Damascus at the time of the rebel assault, ordered aerial bombardment of the city, leading to the destruction of whole neighborhoods and the deaths of hundreds of Damascus residents. By 24 October, the rebels were routed, and al-Bakri escaped. He became the target of criticism among other rebel leaders, namely Said al-'As. Al-'As stated that al-Bakri sought personal glory when he decided to prematurely launch a mostly uncoordinated attack with small numbers of armed volunteers, instead of waiting for the arrival of al-Atrash's reinforcements, who numbered around 1,000. Al-Bakri was the only member of the Damascus nationalist elite to directly participate in the fighting on the ground.

In early December, al-Bakri chaired a meeting of rebel leaders in the Ghouta village of Saqba. During the meeting, he launched scathing criticism of Ramadan al-Shallash, the rebel commander from Deir ez-Zor, condemning him for levying heavy fines and other fees against the residents of the villages of Douma, al-Qisa, Harran al-Awamid and al-Midaa which had been captured by the rebels. However, these taxes were almost entirely directed at the major landowners and city elites, rather than the commoners or peasants. 'As defended al-Shallash as a skilled commander, criticized al-Bakri's leadership and accused him of holding "secret hatreds and ambitions". Nonetheless, al-Bakri and his ally al-Kharrat managed to have al-Shallash "expelled from the rebellion" during the meeting, and stripped of his arms and insignia. However, subsequent French bombardment of Saqba allowed al-Shallash to escape punishment. Al-Kharrat was killed in a French raid two weeks later, while al-Shallash defected to the French following his expulsion. Al-Bakri's younger brother As'ad was killed in action in 1926.

=== Politician during French Mandatory rule ===
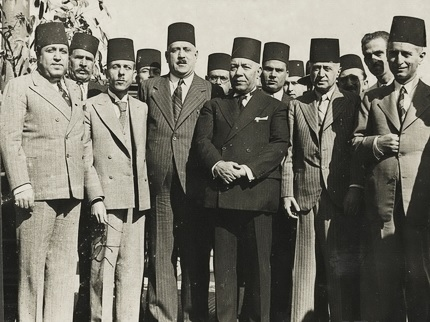
Al-Bakri (third from left in front row) with Arab notables in Cairo, 1930s. To his right is Palestinian journalist Mohamed Ali Eltaher and to his left is Egyptian diplomat Muhammad Ali Alluba

The revolt dissipated by June 1927. Al-Bakri was sentenced to death in absentia by French military tribunal. Consequently, he fled to Amman in Transjordan. In March 1928, al-Bakri, his brother Fawzi, and Fares al-Khoury were amnestied by the French authorities and the al-Bakri family's properties, which had been bombed by the French during the revolt, were restored to them. According to historian Peter A. Shambrook, al-Bakri's inclusion on the amnesty list was surprising for two reasons: he maintained a strong relationship with France's chief rivals in the region, the Hashemites and their British patrons, and he held "unrivaled" influence among the bosses of "the popular quarters of Damascus". The French sought to divide the ranks of the rebels and the nationalist politicians by pardoning some leaders and blacklisting others like al-Atrash, al-Shahbandar, and Shukri al-Quwatli. Al-Bakri's relations with the latter two subsequently grew tense as he accused them of diverting funds for the revolt to their personal ventures.

He and Hashim al-Atassi founded the National Bloc political party. It sought to use diplomatic means to end French rule. He was a part of the 1928 Constitutional Assembly, helping draft a constitution for the Syrian Republic. Al-Atassi appointed him Vice President of the National Bloc in 1930. Al-Bakri successfully ran for parliament as a representative of Damascus on the National Bloc's ticket in 1932, after winning a run-off vote by a large margin.

In January 1936, Syrian nationalist sentiments became incensed as the French authorities suspended parliament and appointed the pro-French president Taj al-Din al-Hasani. Following the arrest of some nationalist leaders, a general strike was declared against the French Mandate and President al-Hasani. Speeches denouncing the arrests and colonialism were made at the Umayyad Mosque, after which demonstrators, including students and local youths, gathered at al-Bakri's home where they coordinated a march to the Serail (French government headquarters). The protests were led by al-Bakri, al-Quwatli and Jamil Mardam Bey, but they were confronted by the security forces before leaving al-Bakri's street.

On 24 January, al-Bakri led a sermon at the mosque calling for calm among the 3,000 demonstrators in attendance. Nonetheless, some 300 left to attack French roadblocks and the police station at Souq al-Hamidiyya, before withdrawing back into the mosque. One protester was killed and the following day, al-Bakri led the funeral procession, which was attended by thousands of mourners. By mid-February, unrest spread throughout Syria and the authorities clashed with Syrian protesters in several cities. The commander of the French Army of the Levant declared martial law and forbade public assemblies. Al-Bakri was arrested and deported on 11 February.

He went on to win the election for his seat in 1936, 1943 and 1947. When al-Atassi became president in 1936, al-Bakri became the chief leader of the National Bloc. The following year, he was appointed by al-Atassi to serve as Governor of Jabal al-Arab. In 1938, he defected from the National Bloc to join the rival People's Party led by his former colleague al-Shahbandar. In the short-lived 1939 cabinet of Prime Minister Lutfi al-Haffar, Bakri was made justice minister, while in Prime Minister Khalid al-Azm's cabinet he served as national economy and agriculture minister.

== Post-independence career ==
After Syria became independent in 1946, al-Bakri joined the pro-Western and Arab nationalist People's Party. President al-Atassi assigned him ambassador to Jordan, ruled by the Hashemites, after al-Bakri refused the ambassadorial post to Saudi Arabia, a government that he opposed ideologically. Following Adib al-Shishakli's seizure of the presidency in 1953, al-Bakri resigned. After al-Shishakli stepped down in 1954, al-Bakri became president of the People's Party. He was unsuccessful in establishing a significant support base in Damascus and resigned from political life in April 1957. He died in 1966.

== Bibliography ==
- Atiyeh, George N. (1988). Arab Civilization: Challenges and Responses: Studies in Honor of Dr. Constantine Zurayk. SUNY Press. ISBN 0-7914-9541-8.
- Moubayed, Sami (2006). Steel and Silk. Cune Press. ISBN 1-885942-41-9.
- Muslih, Muhammad Y. (1988). Origins of Palestinian Nationalism. Columbia University Press. ISBN 0-231-06509-4.
- Provence, Michael (2005). The Great Syrian Revolt and the Rise of Arab Nationalism. University of Texas Press. ISBN 978-0-292-70680-4.
- Shambrook, Peter A. (1998). French Imperialism in Syria, 1927–1936. Garnet & Ithaca Press. ISBN 978-0-86372-243-1.
