= Talal Al-Fayez =

Arabian Emir (c. 1830 - 1891)

Talal bin Fendi Al-Fayez
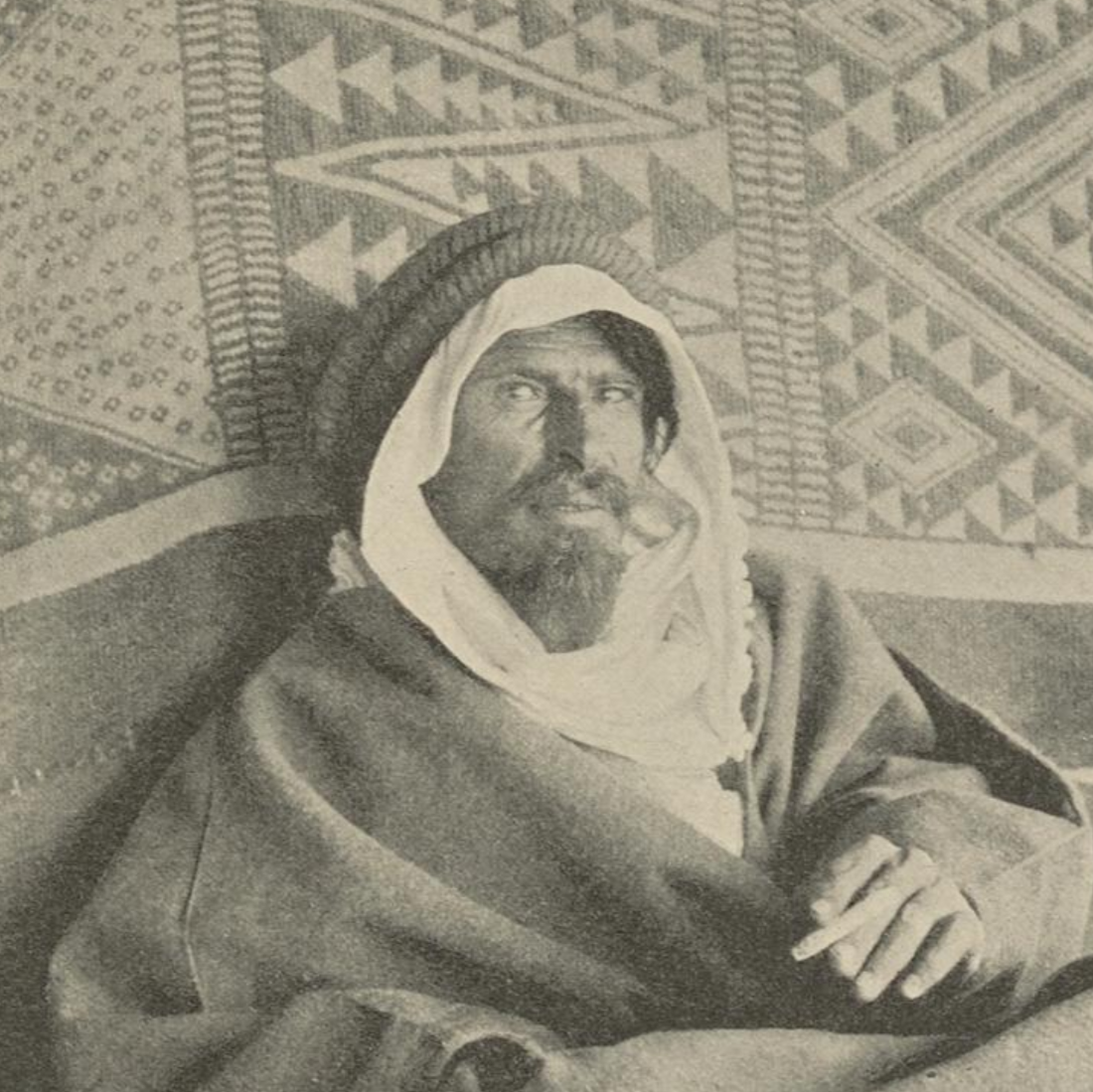
- Born: c. 1835
- Died: 1909 (aged 73–74)
- Resting place: Al-Shaghur, Damascus
- Occupations: High Emir and Tribal Leader
- Years active: 1891–1909
- Title: Beylerbey of the Ottoman Empire; Paramount Sheikh of the Bani Sakher
- Predecessor: Sattam Al-Fayez
- Successor: Fawwaz bin Sattam Al-Fayez
- Father: Fendi Al-Fayez
- Relatives: Sattam Al-Fayez (brother) Mithqal Al-Fayez (nephew)

Talal bin Fendi bin Abbas Al Fayez (Arabic: طلال الفايز, (c. 1835 – 1909) was a beylerbey from the powerful Al-Fayez family. He led the Bani Sakher tribe from 1891 until his death in 1909.

== Succession to power in 1891 ==
Talal's succession to leadership of the paramount sheikhdom of the Bani Sakher was likely an easy and well-accepted transition, as the sons of his brother and predecessor, Sattam bin Fendi, were considered too young and inexperienced for the role. Talal was also backed by the Ottomans for the role and would enjoy great support from 1891 until 1906.

== Relations with the Ottomans ==
Talal generally had excellent relations with the Ottoman state and the Vilayet of Damascus. In 1893, Talal and Sattam's eldest son Fayez were both invited to Constantinople for a reconciliation after Fayez disputed his uncle's leadership. The Ottoman's were successful in the reconciliation, and Talal would return to his tribe with the title of pasha and the highest rank a member of the family got from the Ottomans which is beylerbey (Lord of Lords or High Prince), similar in prestige to his father Fendi bin Abbas's title of king. These cordial relations would continue until 1906.

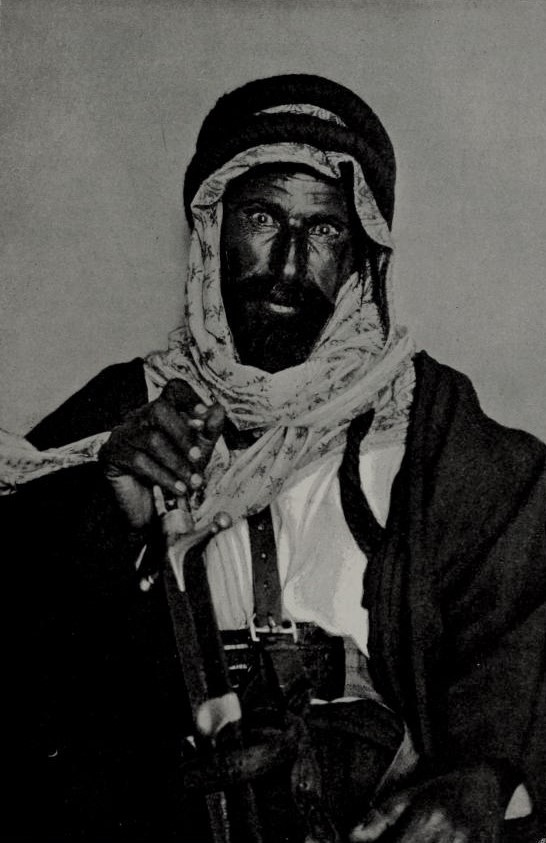
Al-Fayez, 1907.

In 1906, tensions rose between Talal and the Ottomans as the introduction of the Hejaz Railway threatened a valuable source of income for both Talal and his people as protectors of the Hajj Caravan. Talal went to Damascus to protest the railway, the government agreed to continue the payments of protecting the caravan by simply shifting the responsibility to protecting the railway. However, when the railway was completed in 1908, the Ottomans withheld promised subsidies and payments and his salary as a pasha and a beylerbey.

In early 1909, he was invited to Damascus by Governor Shukri Pasha for reconciliation, but the Young Turks' revolution left the governor with no instructions on what to do in this situation.

== Death ==
On his way back from Damascus, Talal, was reportedly poisoned by the Ottomans. He died in Damascus and was buried in the famous old city neighborhood Al-Shaghur. He was succeeded by his nephew, Fawwaz bin Sattam Al-Fayez.

== See also ==
- Fendi Al-Fayez
- Sattam Al-Fayez
- Al-Fayez
