= Ramadan al-Shallash =

Ottoman rebel commander

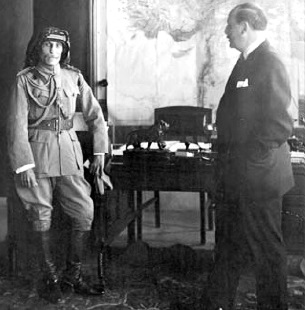
Shallash (left) meeting with the High Commissioner Henry de Jouvenel (right) in January 1926

Ramaḍān Pāshā al-Shallāsh (Arabic: رمضان شلاش; 1879– 1962) was a prominent rebel commander of the 1925 Great Syrian Revolt and, prior to that, a military officer in the Ottoman and Sharifian armies.

Shallash became a captain in the Ottoman army, serving on the Libyan and Balkan fronts in 1911 and 1912, respectively. In 1916, he joined the Arab independence movement of Sharif Hussein. Three years later, he led efforts to ensure Deir ez-Zor and its environs become part of Syria; to that end, he and his Bedouin fighters expelled the British from the city without apparent sanction from Hussein's son, Emir Faisal. He was consequently dismissed from Deir ez-Zor but continued his efforts nonetheless.

After France toppled Faisal's government and took over Syria in 1920, Shallash moved to Transjordan. He served as the intermediary between that country's emir and Faisal's brother, Abdullah, and the northern Syrian revolt leader Ibrahim Hananu. With the launch of the Great Syrian Revolt, Shallash returned to command his own rebel band. He participated in the rebels' brief capture of Damascus and later led operations in the Anti-Lebanon Mountains.

== Early life and education ==
Shallash was born in al-Shumaytiyah, Deir ez-Zor Governorate, likely in 1879. His autobiography states that he was born in 1869, but this was probably printing error. His father was the sheikh (chieftain) of the Al Bu Saraya (also spelled "Albu Saray"), a Bedouin tribe that inhabited the area around Deir ez-Zor. Shallash graduated from Istanbul's Military School for Bedouin Chiefs in 1898. His five years of schooling focused on Islamic education, Ottoman culture and history, and basic reading and writing. Historian Michael Provence holds that due to his older age and other factors, Shallash would have needed the specialized remedial curriculum of the Tribal School". It was at the military academy that he likely met Yasin al-Hashimi, Fawzi al-Qawuqji, Sa'id al-'As and Ja'far al-Askari, later his associates.

== Military career ==
=== Service with the Ottomans ===
After graduating, Shallash was made a yüzbaşı (captain) in the Ottoman Army; this was a high rank for a new graduate and its attainment was due to the imperial favor shown to the sons of rural sheikhs in the military. In 1911, he was sent to fight in Libya against the Italian invasion. There, he encountered the prominent Ottoman officers Aziz Ali al-Misri, Mustafa Kemal and Enver Pasha. After the Ottoman defeat in Libya, Shallash was reassigned to the Balkan front, where he commanded a unit of soldiers from Palestine. Sources are not clear about Shallash's service with the Ottomans during World War I.

=== Service with the Hashemites ===
Shallash himself asserted that he defected from the Ottomans in 1916 to serve in the Sharifian army of the Hashemite leader Sharif Husayn. Accordingly, he fought at Medina during the Arab Revolt against the Ottomans. He served as a commander and a private chamberlain of Sharif Husayn until 1918, following the British-backed Sharifian conquest of Ottoman Syria. Sharif Husayn's son, Emir Faisal set up a rudimentary government in Damascus in October–November 1918 with the support of the allied and clandestine Arab nationalist societies, al-Fatat and al-Ahd. Al-Shallash had been a member of the latter group, which mostly consisted of ex-Ottoman officers from the empire's Arab territories.

In late May 1919, Shallash returned to Deir ez-Zor to rally support for the Arab government in Damascus and stir opposition to British forces among the largest Bedouin tribes in the Jazira region, the Shammar and `Anazzah. He went as far north as Turkish-held Urfa to gather tribal allegiance for the Arab government and support for Damascus's annexation of the regions near British-held Iraq. He received the support of several tribal sheikhs, but none agreed to accompany him back to Damascus to demonstrate their allegiance to Faisal, and many favored their regions becoming part of Iraq.

=== Actions in Deir ez-Zor ===
==== Raid ====
Syria was slated to come under French rule as per the secret Sykes-Picot Agreement with the British, while the latter would control Iraq and Palestine. In September 1919, the British and French agreed that the former would withdraw its troops from Syria to make way for the French, who by then had only deployed along Syria's northern coastline and in Mount Lebanon. Faisal and the Arab nationalists were incensed at the division of Arab territories among the colonial powers, having been promised by the British independence in return for revolting against the Ottomans. The impending withdrawal of British forces prompted al-Ahd's central leadership to use the opportunity to annex Deir ez-Zor to Syria and the al-Ahd leadership chose Shallash to lead the Arab charge in Jazira. Al-Ahd's top leader and the chief of staff of the Arab Army of Syria, Yasin al-Hashimi, directed Ja'far al-Askari, the Arab governor of Aleppo Vilayet, to appoint Shallash governor of the Raqqa District, thereby giving him official cover for his operation in Deir ez-Zor. Al-Hashimi tasked Shallash with taking over the city, transferring to him some Iraqi officers and funds to gain the support of local Bedouin tribes.

On 12 November 1919, Shallash departed Damascus with one hundred camel-mounted troops to Raqqa, from which he set out eastward to Deir ez-Zor with forty troops in December. By then, the city was held by a British military governor, Captain Chamier. As Shallash prepared for his assault on Deir ez-Zor, he spurned tribal leaders in the vicinity to oppose the British and handed them a letter signed by Emir Zayd, Faisal's brother and placeholder while he was in Europe, that asked for them to assist Shallash, the "military governor of the qadaʿ [district] of the Raqqa region, the Khabur river, and the Euphrates". Captain Chamier received intelligence of Shallash's activities and in response, arrested Deir ez-Zor's mayor on suspicion of collaboration with Shallash. Furthermore, on 10 December, Chamier requested support via telegraph from the British regional headquarters in Albu Kamal and Baghdad. Shallash had the telegraph lines to Deir ez-Zor cut soon after.

On 11 December, at 3:00 am, between 500 and 2,000 Bedouin tribesmen raided Deir ez-Zor, entering from its southern entrance, i.e. from the desert instead of the population centers to the east, west and north. The tribesmen were joined by townspeople and together they burned down the local British headquarters, and entered the town's hospital, two mosques and a church. Cash stored in the government house was seized, but the town bazaar was not looted. The tribesmen raided the local prison and freed its inmates. In the fighting, thirty rebels were killed and sixty wounded when a fuel tank was ignited and exploded near them at 5:00 am. Shallash did not command the tribesmen, but was on standby outside of Deir ez-Zor. Chamier and his relatively small group of officers and troops, along with sixty local gendarmes, barricaded themselves in their barracks. They had two armored cars and two machine guns. The armored car that was sent by Chamier to impose order inside Deir ez-Zor was neutralized. Meanwhile, about forty of the gendarmes defected and fled the barracks. At 10:00 am, the barracks came under rebel fire and Chamier's last machine gun was heavily damaged.

With supplies running out, Chamier was obliged to negotiate a truce with the townspeople and local sheikhs at the mayor's residence. Shallash entered the town later in the afternoon, declared the district's independence and raised the Arab flag over the British headquarters. He told Chamier that the people of Deir ez-Zor had requested his intervention and demanded the British withdraw. He also demanded that Syria's border be extended eastward toward Anah. Chamier agreed as long Shallash guaranteed the safety of the Christian community and the Arabs who had served the British. Shallash held the British hostage pending an official assurance that no punitive action would be taken against the city.

==== Further offensives and administration ====
Intent on making Albu Kamal a part of Syria, Shallash dispatched two columns to drive the British out of that city. On 13 December, they captured Mayadin, before proceeding to Albu Kamal the next day. By then, its forty-man British garrison withdrew. Shallash invited the Dulaim tribal sheikhs to join in his efforts against the British, but they rejected and condemned him. Meanwhile, the tribal forces fought over plunder, weakening them and allowing the British to recapture the city with little resistance by 21 December. Mayadin remained under Shallash's control.

The tribal sheikhs around Deir ez-Zor were distributed funds by Shallash to keep their forces deployed in the city. However, most of the sheikhs retreated to their encampments within a few days, leaving Shallash only with the soldiers he arrived with and Al Bu Saray tribesmen. A ten-man council of local dignitaries and sheikhs was formed to administer the city. Funding was provided by Turkish and other foreign donors. However, the local inhabitants grew resentful at Shallash's interference in their affairs. This, coupled with the threat of an opportunistic Turkish invasion of Deir ez-Zor due to the concentration of troops to the north, prompted Shallash to request British financial support to fend off such an invasion; to that end, he met with Chamier on 19 December. The British ultimately refused him assistance, and Faisal, having been informed of events, directed Emir Zayd to dissociate the Arab government from Shallash's actions and order his arrest. The British communicated that they had no interest in Deir ez-Zor and that the Arab government should deal with Shallash. On 25 December, Shallash agreed to release the British hostages after being guaranteed of no reprisals by the British.

==== Dismissal ====
Shallash was not satisfied with the Arab–British agreement that left Albu Kamal, al-Qa'im and Anah on the Iraqi side of the border. He sent men to collect taxes, raid British-held parts of the Jazira and destroy British transport lines. He also threatened to kill the British commander in Albu Kamal should he not withdraw, and to take the fight to Mosul in the north. The British warned Shallash of major repercussions should he continue his campaign; Shallash responded on 11 January 1920 by ordering a raid against Albu Kamal. The British counterattacked and Shallash's men withdrew to Mayadin. The following day, the Arab government ordered Shallash's dismissal, whilst protesting Albu Kamal's exclusion from Syria. Al-Ahd and Emir Zayd agreed that Mawlud Mukhlis replace Shallash, and the former entered Deir ez-Zor on 17 January. Shallash then left for Aleppo.

Angry at this perceived injustice, Shallash returned to Deir ez-Zor in March to incite against Mukhlis. He used an incident where Mukhlis confiscated smuggled gold from a group of Syrian merchants to raise opposition against him. However, Shallash and his supporters were expelled and headed northward to their tribal encampment at al-Tibni. There, he raised a 600-man force and continually agitated against Mukhlis. Later, Shallash was falsely implicated in an incident where disguised Iraqi officers robbed an Iraqi Jew in Deir ez-Zor. This prompted him to castigate and threaten Mukhlis; the latter was wary of Shallash and every time the latter visited his family in Deir ez-Zor, Mukhlis would remain home. Attempts by al-Ahd to mediate between Shallash and Mukhlis failed, but in June 1920 Faisal persuaded Shallash to consult with him in Damascus. During the meeting, Shallash agreed to head a tribal delegation to Ibn Saud, thus removing Shallash far from Deir ez-Zor.

== Resistance against the French ==
=== Early activities ===
The French defeated the motley Arab Army at the Battle of Maysalun in July 1920, after which Faisal's government collapsed and the French took control of the country. In the meantime, the Hananu Revolt continued around Aleppo and Shallash had formed his own rebel band in the Jazira. However, he moved to British-held Transjordan in the aftermath of Maysalun to escape a French arrest warrant. From early 1921, he acted as an intermediary between Ibrahim Hananu and Emir Abdullah of Transjordan.

=== Commander in the Great Syrian Revolt ===
Shallash moved back to Syria in September 1925, to join the Great Syrian Revolt. According to Provence,

He [Shallash] fought in the revolt and mobilized peasants, nomads, and villagers throughout Syria with a complicated and apparently potent mix of nationalism, popular religious fervor, evocations of Arab honor, Kemalist enthusiasm, and class warfare against big landlords aligned with the French Mandatory government.

Shallash's forces formed one of the four main bands active in the greater Damascus region. He joined with Fawzi al-Qawuqji's band following the latter's defeat in Hama in early October. Meanwhile, rebels in the Ghouta led by Hasan al-Kharrat and Nasib al-Bakri were poised to attack and capture Damascus from the French and requested backing from Qawuqji and the Druze warriors of Sultan al-Atrash. Qawuqji and Shallash headed toward Damascus from Hama's eastern countryside, but Bakri and Kharrat launched their assault before they arrived. After Kharrat captured al-Shaghour, he was joined by Shallash and twenty of his Bedouin horsemen; the combined force then seized the Azm Palace, headquarters of High-Commissioner Maurice Sarrail, who was absent at the time. After the French aerial bombardment of Damascus, Shallash condemned the action, stating:

With cannons and aeroplanes you bombed a large city like Damascus without any warning: this has turned all of Syria against you, and irritated the whole Muslim world and made you a laughing stock of Nations, because you forgot the simplest of international laws. ... If General Sarrail is a stupid idiot, is it not your duty to warn him of the damage you would suffer and the ill reputation which would result for France in the Orient? You have lost the confidence of the Muslims and the Christians in all of Syria. By your act of barbarism, you have given a powerful weapon to the Muslim world and to the Power which works against you.

=== Activities in the Anti-Lebanon Mountains ===
By November, Shallash and his tribal fighters joined forces with Jum'a Sawsaq; the latter was the former mukhtar (headman) of Rankus and led a rebel band whose area of operations extended from an-Nabk southward to Zabadani. Their combined forces numbered between 600 and 1,000 Bedouin and peasant fighters, and both Shallash and Sawsaq declared themselves, with al-Atrash's sanction, joint commanders of a "National Army" brigade. According to Provence, "the French viewed this development with horror" since the formation had the potential to attract a much larger following of nationalists and gain funding from pan-Arab associations.

Throughout November, Shallash secretly entered the villages of the Qalamoun Mountains at night to recruit fighters, attack gendarmes, plunder local Mandate headquarters and the homes of French-friendly individuals. He often called these villages to take up an armed struggle like that of Mustafa Kemal and comparing their respective villages to Ankara in 1920, the scene of Turkish anti-colonialist insurgency. According to French intelligence reports, Shallash's calls were highly popular to both Muslim and Christian villagers. One historian even suggests that he "had become a kind of Robin Hood figure of the insurgency" given his blend of "patriotism and nationalism with a mix of social justice, popular religious fervor, and class warfare."

=== Intra-rebel disputes and surrender ===
Shallash surrendered to the French Mandatory authorities in 1926. According to Shallash, "plots and tricks forced him to surrender".

== Later life and death ==
He was held by the authorities in Beirut until 1937. Shallash commanded another uprising against the French in Deir ez-Zor in support of the Rashid Ali coup in Baghdad in 1941. However, the revolt was put down, and Shallash was captured. He was jailed in Beirut again, and released in 1946, the year Syria became independent. Shallash also died that year. A biography of Shallash, Ramadan al-Shallash: Ahad Abtal al-Tarikh al-Arabi [Ramadan Shallash: A Hero of Arab History], written by Fa'iz al-Shallash was published in Cairo in 2001.
