= 1925 Hama uprising =

Incident during the Great Syrian Revolt of 1925-27

Coordinates: 35°8′0″N 36°46′7″E

- Part of the Great Syrian Revolt
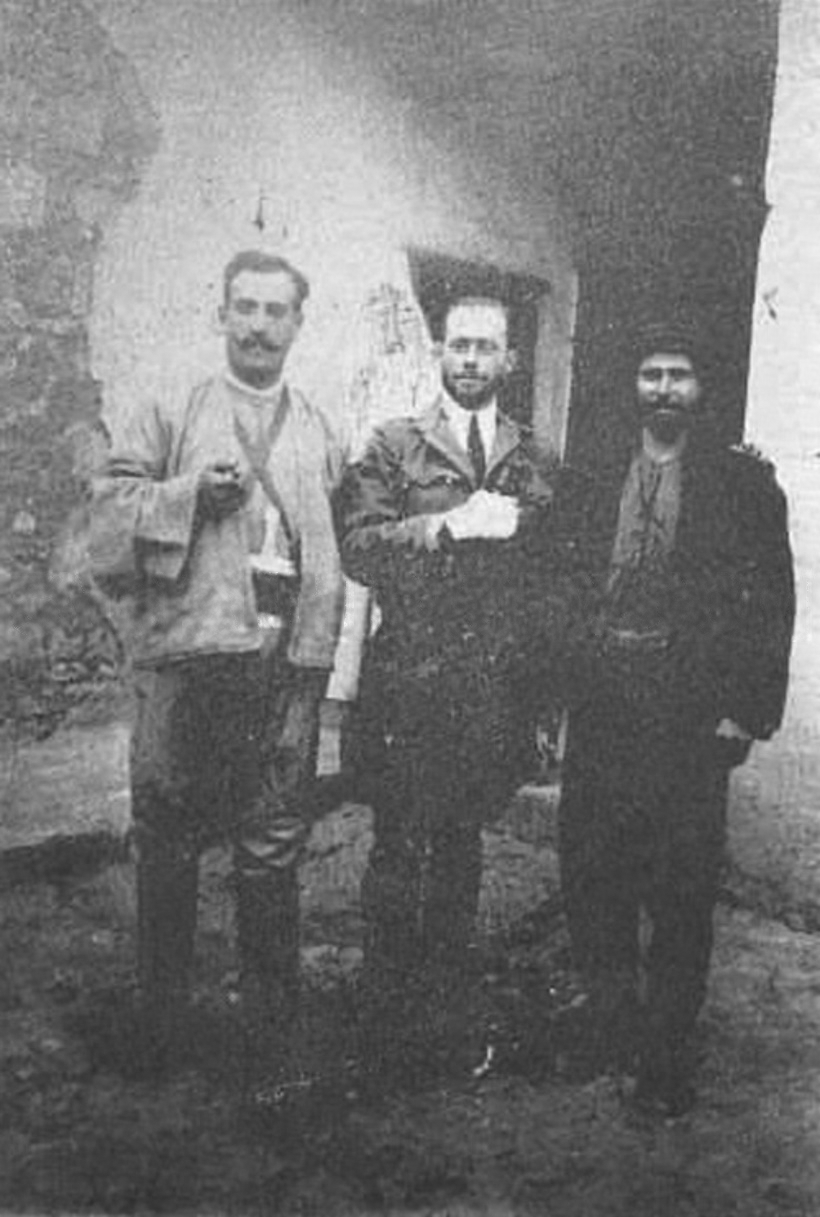
- Nasib al-Bakri, Fawzi al-Qawuqji and Abu Muhiddine Shaaban during the Hama uprising.
Date	4–5 October 1925
Location	Hama, Mandatory Syria
Result	French victory

Belligerents
France: Syrian Federation; Army of the Levant; French Air Force	Syrian rebels

Commanders and leaders
(France) Gen. Maurice Gamelin (France) Com. Eugène Coustillère	Fawzi al-Qawuqji

Strength
French garrison in Hama; Two company reinforcements (250 men)	Hundreds (mutinous auxiliaries of the French Syrian Legion and Mawali tribal irregulars)

Casualties and losses
N/A	76 deaths (French claim)
- 344 civilian deaths

The 1925 Hama uprising was one of the major events of the Great Syrian Revolt. It involved a rebel assault led by Fawzi al-Qawuqji against Mandatory French security installations in Hama and a subsequent uprising by residents sympathetic to the rebel cause. Heavy French bombardment of the city and the dispatch of reinforcements followed. The hostilities began on 4 October 1925 and negotiations between a delegation of Hama's leading families and the French authorities resulted in the rebels' withdrawal on 5 October.

== Background ==
In 1918, during World War I, the Ottoman Turks were driven out of Syria by the Allied Forces and their Hashemite Arab allies, after which the latter assumed authority over the country. In 1920 France gained control of Syria under the auspices of a mandate by the League of Nations, a move largely rejected by the general population. Syria was divided into six autonomous entities, including the State of Damascus and Jabal Druze State. Tensions between the French authorities and the leaders of Jabal al-Druze began to surface from 1922 and in the mid-summer of 1925, the Druze leader Sultan Pasha al-Atrash declared an uprising against the French Mandate after the imprisonment of three prominent Druze leaders who were invited to Damascus for talks with the authorities. After a number of significant military successes against the French Army, Syrian nationalists throughout the country were inspired to take up arms. One of those nationalists who was particularly impressed by the actions of al-Atrash's men was Fawzi al-Qawuqji, a veteran soldier from the Ottoman army who fought against the Italian occupation of Libya and later against the Allied forces in Syria. In 1925 he served as a cavalry commander for the French Syrian Legion.

The city of Hama, which was part of the State of Damascus and was the third largest city in Syria at the time, was "known for its Islamic conservatism and fierce opposition to French rule," according to historian Michael Provence. Together with members of the city's religious establishment, al-Qawuqji formed the Hizb Allah ("Party of God"), an outfit for anti-French activity. The party, according to al-Qawuqji, was devoted to nationalism and independence from France, but there was also an apparent religious character to the organization. Hama itself was far more outwardly religious compared to Damascus.

== Planning ==
Following the Druze assault against the French Army at al-Musayfirah, al-Qawuqji sent emissaries to al-Atrash to notify him of the strength of his Hama-based forces, request that al-Atrash maintain the pressure against French troops in the Hauran, and to establish oral communication between their forces via a trusted connection. Al-Qawuqji's membership in the French Mandatory army allowed for him to keep track of the routines and activities of the French command in Hama. His party also had the support of large segments of Hama's inhabitants, many of whom were members, while the French lacked any local sympathy. In the months preceding the uprising in Hama, al-Qawuqji had been fostering close ties with Hama's religious leaders, local Bedouin, the merchants and the police, encouraging them to join in a holy war against the French and promising them to divide the riches of the government's offices and banks, which he claimed had been stolen from the Syrian people. The city's landlords also lent their support to al-Qawuqji due to their opposition to planned French land reforms. Despite al-Qawuqji's apparently wide scale campaign promoting rebellion, French intelligence was unaware of an impending uprising.

== Uprising ==
On 4 October, at 7:00 pm, al-Qawuqji commanded the mutiny of his entire cavalry unit and together with irregulars from the nomadic Mawali tribe, his forces numbered in the hundreds. According to Provence, al-Qawuqji had the local "Syrian Legion, several hundred bedouin tribesmen and the entire population of Hama behind him." The rebels proceeded to occupy the city, cutting off its telephone lines, blocking its main thoroughfares and assaulting the government palace (saray). In their attack against the saray, the rebels captured several French officers who had not fled and released prisoners being held in the compound. The city had fallen to al-Qawuqji's forces by 11:30 pm.

In response, French forces commenced a heavy aerial bombardment of the city from sunrise the following morning, 5 October, until the early afternoon. The bulk of French ground forces had been concentrated in Jabal al-Arab at the time. Most of Hama's souks ("bazaars") and numerous homes of leading city notables were consequently destroyed. Meanwhile, two companies of French reinforcements from Rayak and Aleppo were rushed to dislodge the rebels. French authorities had also mobilized the support of the rural landlords against Hama's urban and tribal nationalist leaders. Hama's major landowning families, who had initially supported al-Qawuqji's plans for revolt, feared further destruction to their property. Represented by mayor Najib al-Barazi and Farid al-Azm, the head of the city's most influential family al-Azm, they broke rebel ranks and met with Eugène Coustillère, the commander of the captured saray, and negotiated an end to the bombardment. In return, the city's notables agreed to convince the rebels to withdraw from the city. By the end of the day, al-Barazi persuaded al-Qawuqji to depart with his men.

The uprising and the subsequent bombardment ended with the deaths 344 Syrians, mostly civilians, according to a petition by the city's residents to the League of Nations. The authorities countered that only 76 people were killed, all of them rebels. However, French intelligence documented more than 100 Syrian deaths. Al-Qawuqji was charged with high treason and sentenced to death in absentia while 355 people from Hama were detained by the authorities. Property damage included the destruction of 115 shops, two souks, 144 homes, including several villas. On 10 October the French newspaper Bulletin de Renseignements proclaimed "... the excellent impression produced by the energetic manner in which order was restored during the events in Ḥamâh. The prestige of France is vastly increased ..."

== Aftermath ==
After withdrawing, al-Qawuqji and his forces regrouped with Ramadan al-Shallash, a rebel leader from Deir ez-Zor, who had just arrived from British-controlled Transjordan. The revolt in Hama was the first major confrontation between rebels and French troops outside of the Hauran and although press censorship officially blocked news of events in the city, word had spread and rebel groups emerged across the country. Particularly in Damascus, its environs and the Ghouta countryside, relatively autonomous insurgent groups increased their guerrilla efforts against the French Army. According to al-Qawuqji, who continued to foment rebellion in villages across Syria, "The gates of Syria's fields were opened before us for revolt." He boasted about the failure of French intelligence and how the "cunning" of the Arabs triumphed over that of France.

On 18 October rebels under the leadership of Hasan al-Kharrat and Nasib al-Bakri led a major rebel assault against French troops based in Damascus, occupying the city and capturing the Azm Palace, which served as the residence of the new high-commissioner, General Maurice Sarrail. Al-Shallash managed to participate in the battle, but al-Qawuqji and his men arrived too late. Following massive aerial and ground bombardment of the city, resulting in thousands of deaths and wide scale destruction, French forces retook Damascus. The commander of the French garrison in Damascus reportedly "wished the Damascenes would give France a chance of dealing with them as the Hama rebels had been dealt with."

In the following months rebels continued their guerrilla campaign in the Ghouta, but after the imprisonment and exile of hundreds of nationalist leaders, including al-Qawuqji and al-Atrash, the death of al-Kharrat and the defection of al-Shallash, the rebels were largely defeated by 26 November. Sporadic fighting in Hama as well as Jabal al-Arab continued until 1927.

== Bibliography ==
- Moubayed, Sami (2006). Steel and Silk. Cune Press. ISBN 1-885942-41-9.
- Provence, Michael (2005). The Great Syrian Revolt and the Rise of Arab Nationalism. University of Texas Press. ISBN 978-0-292-70680-4.
- Rogan, Eugene L. (2011). The Arabs: A History. Basic Books. ISBN 978-0-465-02504-6.
- Thompson, Elizabeth (2000). Colonial Citizens: Republican Rights, Paternal Privilege, and Gender in French Syria and Lebanon. Columbia University Press. ISBN 0-231-10661-0.
