= Al-Busraya =

Arab tribe

Al-Busraya البو سرايا
- Location: Deir ez-Zor Governorate, Syria
- Language: Arabic
- Religion: Islam

Al-Busraya is an Arab tribe located on the banks of the Euphrates river.

== Lineage ==
They belong to the Al-Uqaydat through a military alliance, according to their lineage, and belong to the Al-Masoud Shammar tribe, descendants of Salem, nicknamed Sarawi for his numerous virtues at that time, according to the article by Sheikh Hamoud Al-Shalash, transmitted by Colonel Muller.

The Busraya is divided into several clans:

- Al-Bu Azzam
- Al-Bu Izz al-Din
- Al-Bu Shaib
- Al-Bu Hamza

== History ==
Ahmad Wasfi Zakaria mentioned in his book, "Tribes of the Levant", that the Sheikhdom of the Al-Busraya clan was in the hands of Hamoud Al-Shalash Al-Abdullah Al-Sulayman Al-Dhiyab, brother of Ramadan Pasha Al-Shalash, and then, as a result of attacks launched by the Al-Busraya clan against French colonial forces following the outbreak of the Great Syrian Revolution in 1925, in which two French officers were killed, the sheikh was transferred to his cousin Fayyad Al-Nasir Al-Abdullah Al-Sulayman Al-Dhiyab, and from him it passed to his son Ahmad.

=== Participation in the Great Syrian Revolt ===
Ramadan led his forces to the banks of the Euphrates River and besieged the French in Deir ez-Zor and was sentenced to death and therefore fled to Jordan.

=== Epic of Ain Albu Gomaa ===
Mohammed ِAl-Ayyash organized a rebel group on the banks of the Euphrates River to confront the French.

=== Current Sheikh ===
The Sheikh of the Al-Busraya clan is Muhanna bin Faisal bin Ahmed Al-Fayyad Al-Nasser Al-Abdullah Al-Sulayman Al-Dhiyab. He was born in the city of Al-Shumaytiyah, in the province of Deir ez-Zor, in 1982. He has been a member of the Syrian People's Assembly since 2012.

== Syrian civil war ==
The Islamic State killed 7 members of the tribe after signing a treaty with Al-Shaitat in 2014.

=== After the Islamic State ===
After the expulsion of ISIS the Russian forces called on the tribes to return to Deir ez-Zor Governorate and Muhanna Al-Fayyad, leader of the tribe, described the reconciliation process as "exhaustive and definitive."

=== Al-Busraya Revolutionaries ===
Al-Busraya Revolutionaries
- ثوار البصرة
- Founded: December 6, 2024
- Dates active: 2024 — ?
- Country: Syria
- Group: Al-Busraya
- Headquarters: Al-Shumaytiyah; Al-Kharita
- Active regions: Deir ez-Zor Governorate
- Political position: tribalism
- Wars: Syrian civil war; 2024 Syrian opposition offensives; Deir ez-Zor offensive (2024)

Al-Busraya Revolutionaries is a militant organization based in the tribe that occupied the villages of Al-Shumaytiyah and Al-Kharita on 6 December 2024 in Deir ez-Zor offensive after defecting from Syrian Democratic Forces.
