= Sa'id al-As =

Syrian nationalist and commander of rebel forces (1889–1936)

Sa'id al-'As
- سعيد العاص
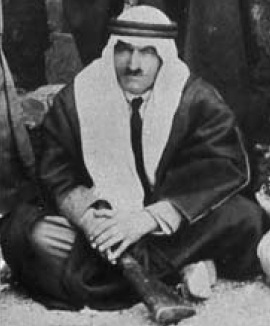
- Al-'As seated with his rifle, 1925
- Born: 1889; Hama, Ottoman Syria, Ottoman Empire
- Died: 6 October 1936 (aged 46–47); Jerusalem vicinity, British Mandate of Palestine
- Military career
- Allegiance: Arab Kingdom of Syria; Kingdom of Iraq
- Service years: 1918–1920 (Kingdom of Syria); 1925–1927 (Syrian rebels); 1927–1936 (Kingdom of Iraq)
- Commands: General Commander of Great Syrian Revolt (1925–1927); Commander of Rebels in Jerusalem (1936)
- Conflicts: Franco-Syrian War; Battle of Maysalun; Great Syrian Revolt; Arab Revolt in Palestine †

Sa'id al-'As (Arabic: سعيد العاص; 1889 – 6 October 1936) was a Syrian nationalist, a former officer in the Ottoman army and a high-ranking commander of rebel forces during the Great Syrian Revolt against French rule in Syria and the 1936 revolt against British rule in Palestine. He was killed in action near Jerusalem during the latter uprising.

== Early life ==
Al-'As was born to a family of modest financial means in Hama, central Syria, in 1889. He graduated from the Ottoman Military School in Damascus and later the Ottoman Military College (Maktab Harbiye) in Istanbul. Ottoman rule in Syria ended in 1918 with their defeat by British and Sharifian forces in World War I. Following the war, al-'As was among the group of former Ottoman officers who allied with the Sharifian commander Emir Faisal. Faisal served as king of the Kingdom of Syria until 1920, when the kingdom was dissolved by French forces after they defeated Faisal's army in the Battle of Maysalun. Al-'As participated in that battle. Afterward, the French Mandate of Syria was established. Al-'As then left for Amman in the Emirate of Transjordan, where he lived in exile.

== Role in the Great Syrian Revolt ==
In the mid-summer of 1925, after three prominent Druze leaders were invited to Damascus by the French authorities, only to be arrested and imprisoned, Sultan Pasha al-Atrash rallied his Druze warriors in Jabal al-Arab and declared a revolt against French rule in Syria. After scoring a number of victories against the French Army, al-Atrash's rebellion inspired Syrian nationalists throughout the country to take up arms and the uprising spread throughout the country.

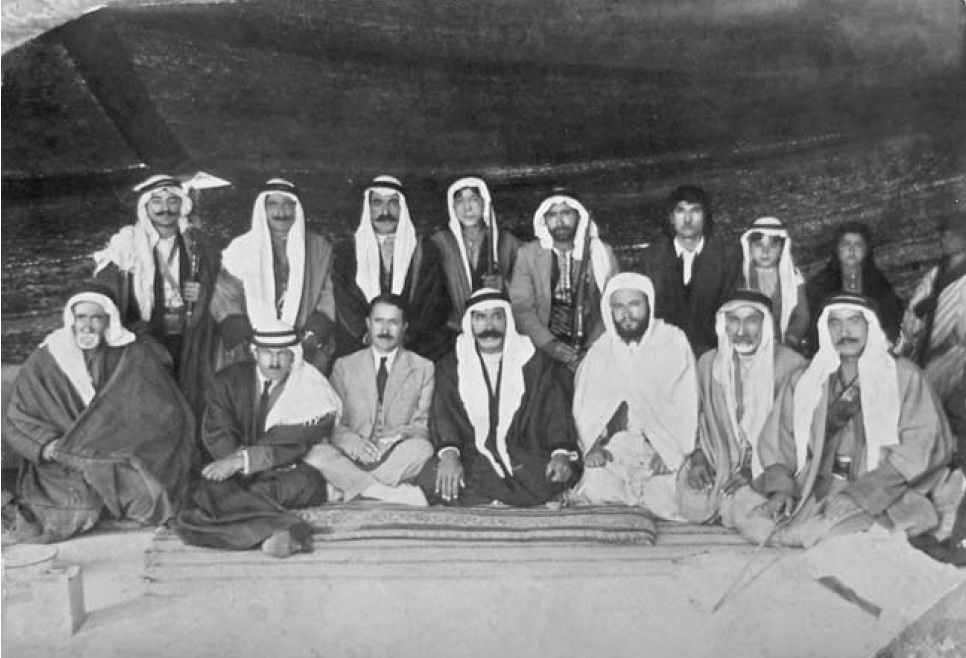
A meeting of exiled rebel leaders in Wadi al-Sirhan in Saudi Arabia, October 1929. Sultan Pasha al-Atrash is seated in the middle of the bottom row, and al-'As is seated second to his right

Al-'As became a prominent leader of the rebellion, moving between the Ghouta countryside of Damascus and the Jabal in the Hauran. In a 26 November meeting of rebel leaders in Saqba, a village near Damascus, al-'As was chosen as the general leader of the rebellion. His position was reconfirmed in another meeting of the rebel leadership in Saqba on 5 December. In the latter meeting al-'As contested the leadership of his rival Nasib al-Bakri. Al-Bakri's closest rebel ally, Hasan al-Kharrat, had detained an important rebel leader from Deir ez-Zor, Ramadan al-Shallash, and along with al-Bakri, accused him of levying illegitimate taxes against villages to enrich himself. Although several officers disapproved of al-Kharrat's procedures against al-Shallash, a judgement was made expelling al-Shallash from the rebellion. Before the judgement could be exercised, French aircraft bombarded Saqba and amid the bombing al-'As had al-Shallash released.

As the revolt came to an end in 1927, al-'As departed from the al-Nabk region where he and other rebel leaders had been recruiting volunteers. Al-'As then headed for Deir ez-Zor, located along the Euphrates River in the Syrian Desert. From there, he and Fawzi al-Qawuqji left for Baghdad in the Kingdom of Iraq, which at the time was under a degree of British military administration. In Iraq he served under King Faisal, who had previously been forced out of Syria in 1920. Together, al-'As and al-Qawuqji helped to train and organize the Royal Iraqi Army.

== Commander in Palestine ==
When the Palestinian Arab revolt against British rule and increased Zionism immigration to Palestine erupted in 1936, hundreds of Arab volunteers arrived to support the uprising, including some 200 Syrians, many of whom were inspired by Izz al-Din al-Qassam, a Syrian guerrilla leader who struggled and died fighting the British in Palestine a year earlier. Al-'As was among them and was one of their two leaders, according to Palestinian historian Basheer M. Nafi. The other commander was Muhammad al-Ashmar. Al-'As served as the overall commander of Arab fighters in the vicinity of Jerusalem and his second-in-command was Abd al-Qadir al-Husayni, a Palestinian commander from a prominent Jerusalemite family.

== Death and legacy ==
Al-'As was killed in a confrontation with British forces in the Jerusalem area on 6 October 1936. Al-Husayni was severely wounded in the clash, which ended his military activities for the remainder of the year. However, he emerged as al-'As's successor in the Jerusalem sector between 1937 and the end of the revolt in 1939.

In 1935, al-'As had Safahat min al-ayyam al-hamraa, a collection of his memoirs on the Great Syrian Revolt, published. The book was later republished by his grandson. From the perspective of the Ba'athist governments of Hafez al-Assad and Bashar al-Assad, al-'As's nationalist credentials are relatively strong, but he was not honored like some of the other prominent leaders of the revolt, such as Sultan Pasha al-Atrash or Hasan al-Kharrat. The reason behind this was the posthumous adoption of al-'As as a "nationalist saint" by the Syrian Social Nationalist Party (SSNP) of Antun Saadeh. The SSNP and the Ba'ath Party had an acrimonious relationship, and the former was banned in Ba'athist-run Syria.
