= Abdul Rahman Shahbandar =

Syrian nationalist politician

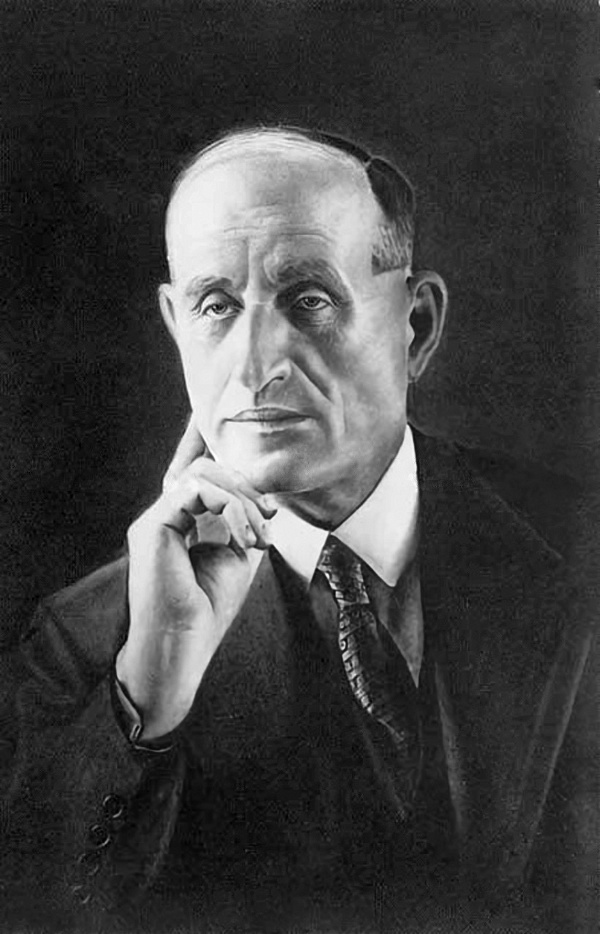
- Shahbandar in January 1920
- Born: November 6, 1879; Damascus, Ottoman Syria
- Died: July 6, 1940 (aged 60); Damascus, French Syria
- Known for: Syrian nationalist
- Spouse: Sarah

Abdul Rahman Shahbandar (Arabic: عبد الرحمن الشهبندر; ALA-LC: ‘Abd al-Raḥman al-Shahbandar; November 6, 1879 – July 6, 1940) was a Syrian statesman and prominent nationalist figure during the French Mandate of Syria. He was a leading opponent of compromise with the French colonial authority in Syria, and his devotion to Arab nationalism dated to the days of the Committee of Union and Progress and its "Turkification" policies. Shahbandar supported the Arab Revolt during the First World War and briefly headed the foreign ministry under Emir Faisal.

== Life ==
When France occupied Syria in July 1920 he fled the country. Shahbandar returned in 1921 and organized the Iron Hand Society to agitate against French rule. This was the first Syrian nationalist group to emerge in Damascus during the Mandate and Shahbandar organized its spread to Homs and Hama. In April 1922, the French arrested him and other Iron Hand leaders for incitement against their rule. The arrests triggered several days of demonstrations and bloody confrontation between protesters and French forces in Damascus. Nonetheless, the French tried Shahbandar for subversive activities and sentenced him to 20 years of imprisonment.

After serving 1½ years of his sentence the French sent him into exile where he joined the activities of the Syrian-Palestine Congress based in Cairo. The French allowed him to return to Syria in 1924. The following year Shahbandar guided the formation of Syria's first nationalist party, the People's Party. He then helped organize the spread of the Syrian Revolution from Jabal Druze to the rest of Syria. He eluded the French authorities and moved to Jabal Druze for the duration of the revolt. There he and Sultan al-Atrash formed a provisional government. When the revolt collapsed in 1927 Shahbandar fled to Transjordan and from there to Egypt.

In 1937 a French amnesty allowed him to return from exile and he directed his supporters to oppose the Franco-Syrian Treaty on the grounds that it granted France privileges that detracted from Syrian sovereignty. He was joined by powerful Syrian politicians such as Munir al-Ajlani. He also directed a political campaign to discredit the National Bloc government of Prime Minister Jamil Mardam Bey. During World War II the French considered cooperating with Shahbandar because of his opposition to the National Bloc and because of support for him from Britain and the Hashemites.

== Death ==
On July 6, 1940, Shahbandar was killed in Damascus. The French accused several prominent National Bloc figures, including Jamil Mardam and Saadallah al-Jabiri, of plotting the murder and they fled to Iraq. While Shahbandar was one of Syria's most popular leaders he never built up an organization that would perpetuate his political legacy.

== See also ==
- Great Syrian Revolt
- Ayyash Al-Haj
- Ibrahim Hananu
- Yusuf al-'Azma
- Sultan Al-Atrash
- Hasan al-Kharrat
- Mandate for Syria and the Lebanon
- Henri Gouraud
- Syria
- Adham Khanjar
- Saleh Al-Ali
- Fawzi al-Qawuqji
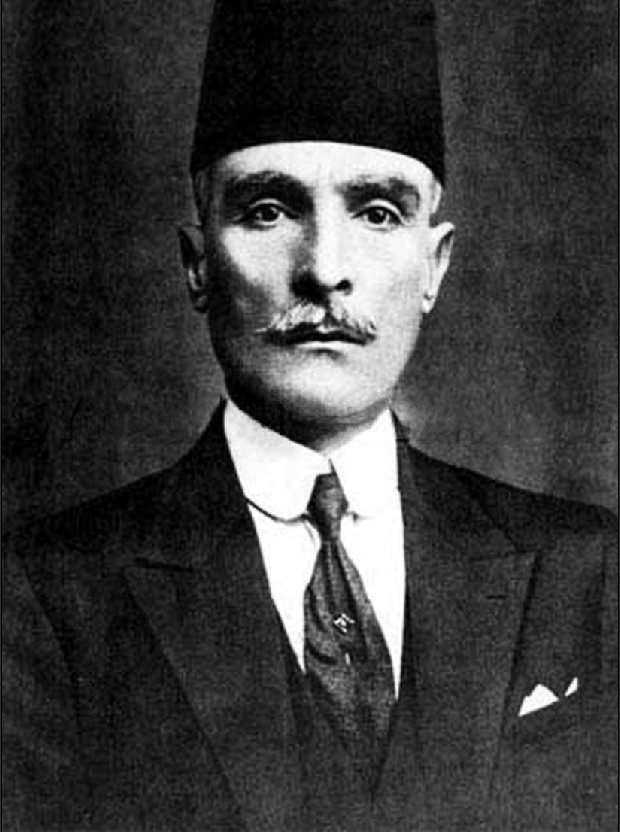
Ibrahim Hananu

Ayyash Al-Haj

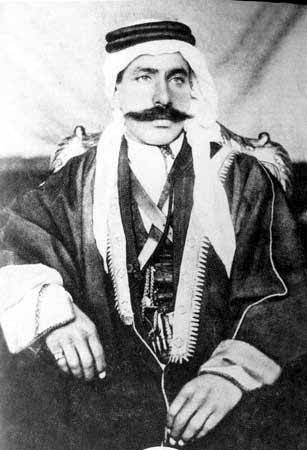
Sultan Al-Atrash

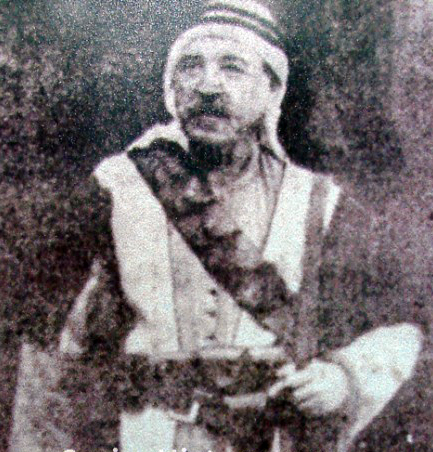
Saleh Al-Ali

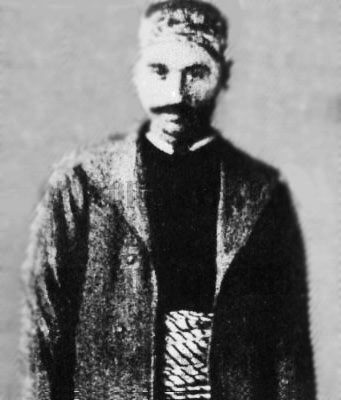
Hasan al-Kharrat

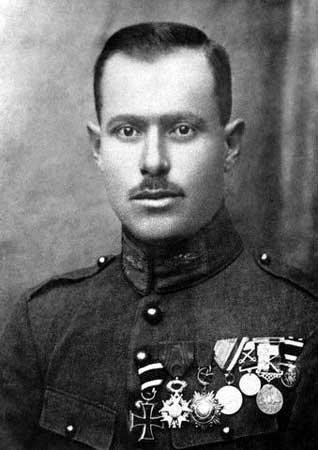
Fawzi al-Qawuqji
