= Al-Shaghur, Damascus =

Al-Shaghour ٱلشَّاغُور aš-Šāḡūr
- Municipality
- Al-Shaghour on the district map of Damascus
- Coordinates: 33°28′27″N 36°18′11″E
- Country: Syria
- Governorate: Damascus Governorate
- City: Damascus

Population (2004)
  - Total: 119,569
- Time zone: UTC+3 (EET)
  - Summer (DST): UTC+2 (EEST)
- Climate: BSk

Al-Shaghour (Arabic: ٱلشَّاغُور, romanized: aš-Šāḡūr) is a municipality and a neighborhood located in the old walled city of Damascus, Syria, south and east of the Old City, and east of al-Midan. Al-Shaghour is one of the oldest recorded neighborhoods in the city. The traditional neighborhood is divided into the part located within the Old City walls, known as Shaghour al-Juwani, and the much larger part located outside the walls. The latter part has become a municipality known as al-Shaghour.

Old al-Shaghour is separated from al-Midan to the west by Al-Beit Street and from Harat al-Yahud (Jewish Quarter) by Al-Ameen Street. The latter, named after a prominent Shiite figure, is the main road in the neighborhood and accommodates the market place and the main shops. Al-Shaghour is also home to many of the prominent Shia Muslim families of Damascus.

== History ==
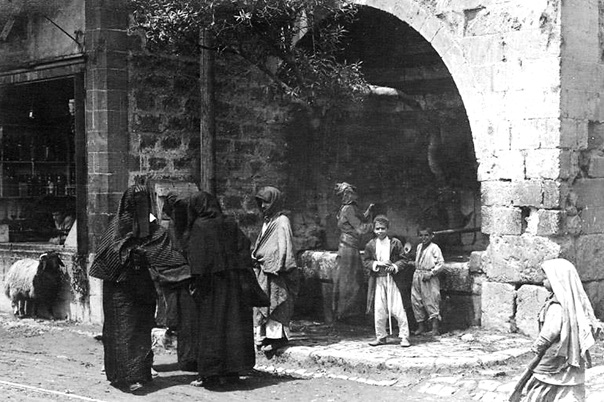
Shaghour in 1910

During the French mandate, part of the neighborhood, known as "Shaghour al-Juwani" was located within the Old City walls, while most of the neighborhood was located outside the city walls and is known as "Shaghour al-Barrani". The total population of al-Shaghour was 18,715 in 1936, with 34% living in Shaghour al-Juwani and 66% living al-Shaghour al-Barrani. The entire population was Muslim.

Al-Shaghour was a major center of resistance to French rule. Many of its inhabitants were involved in political activism and in the development of Syria's national political thought is the 1930s. Al-Shaghour was the home to several prominent intellectuals and political figures including the famous poet Nizar Qabbani, the minister of defense of the Kingdom of Syria, Yusuf al-Azma, and Hasan al-Kharrat, the most prominent rebel leader in Damascus during the 1925 Great Syrian Revolt.

== Districts ==
By the 21st century, Shaghour al-Barrani evolved to become the larger al-Shaghour Municipality, which in 2004 consisted of the city districts (hayy) of Shaghour al-Barrani (pop. 13,169), al-Bilal (pop. 21,408), al-Zuhur (pop. 37,367), Bab Sharqi (pop. 12,318), al-Wihdah (pop. 29,953), Rawdat al-Midan (pop. 4,887), al-Nidal (pop. 15,588) and Ibn al-Asakir (pop. 4,539). Shaghour al-Juwani is located in the Old City municipality and had a population of 2,506 in 2004.

== Bibliography ==
- Neep, Daniel (2012). Occupying Syria Under the French Mandate: Insurgency, Space and State Formation. Cambridge University Press. ISBN 978-1107000063.
- Totah, Faedah M. (2014). Preserving the Old City of Damascus. Syracuse University Press. ISBN 9780815652625.
