= Great Syrian Revolt =

1925–1927 uprising against French rule

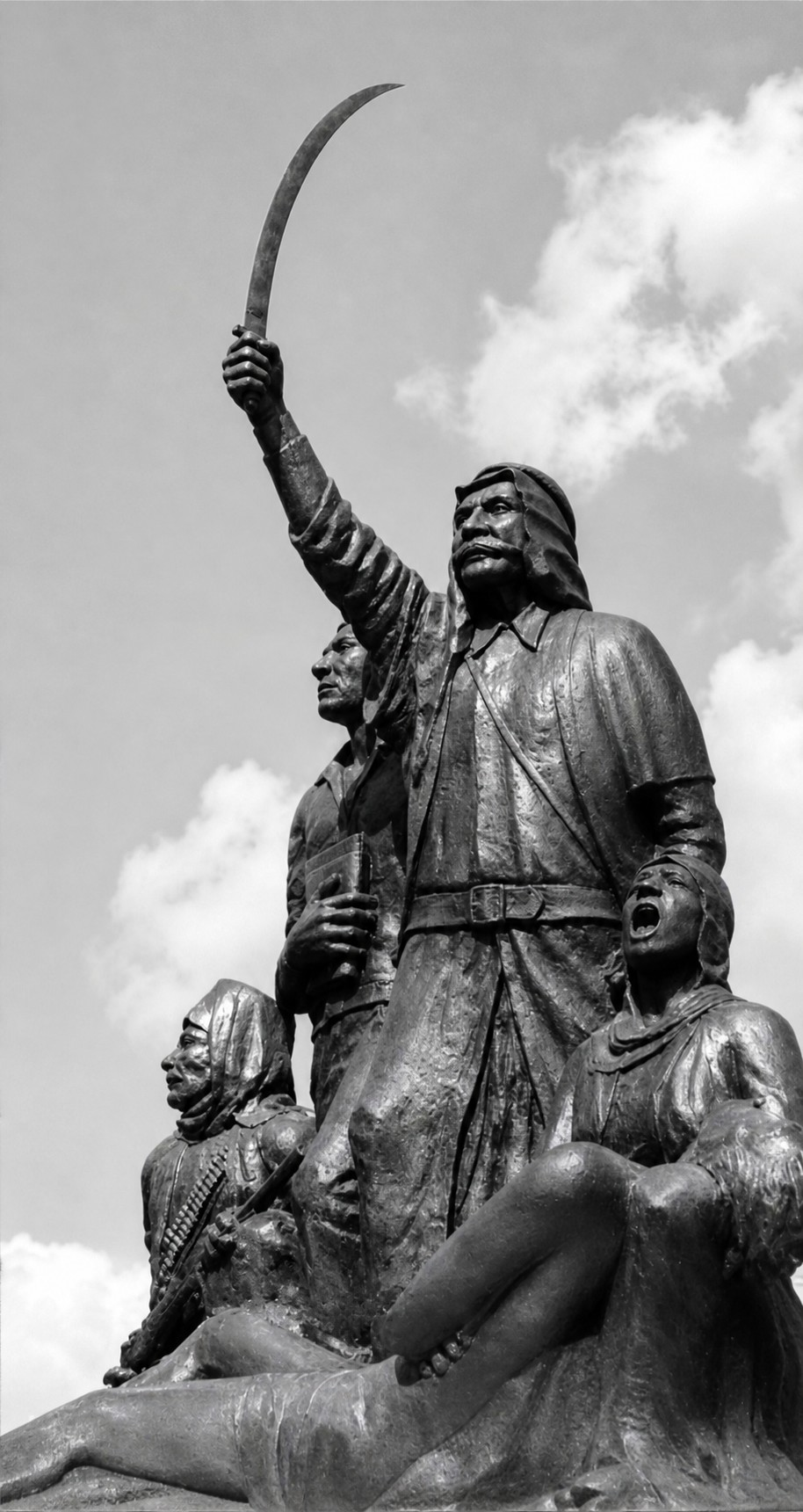
- Statue of the Great Syrian Revolution in Majdal Shams
Date	1925–1927 (2 years)
Location	State of Syria and Greater Lebanon
Result	French victory

Belligerents
France: Syria; Lebanon	Syria: Sunnis; Shiites; Druze; Alawites; Kurds; Turkmen

Commanders and leaders
(France) Maurice Sarrail (France) Roger Michaud † (France) Maurice Gamelin (France) Henry de Jouvenel (France) Charles Andréa	Sultan al-Atrash; Fawzi al-Qawuqji; Hasan al-Kharrat †; Nasib al-Bakri Abd al-Rahman Shahbandar

The Great Syrian Revolt (Arabic: الثورة السورية الكبرى, romanized: al-thawrah al-Sūriyyah al-kubrā), also known as the Revolt of 1925, was a general uprising across the State of Syria and Greater Lebanon during the period of 1925 to 1927. The revolt was a response to the repressive policies of the French authorities under the Mandate for Syria and Lebanon, which divided Syria into several occupied territories. The leading rebel forces initially comprised fighters of the Jabal Druze State in southern Syria, and were later joined by Sunni, Druze and Shiite and factions all over Syria. The common goal was to end French occupation in the newly mandated regions, which passed from Ottoman to French administration following World War I.

While the French army and local collaborators achieved military victory, Syrian resistance led to the establishment of a national government of Syria, under which the divided territories were reunited. In addition parliamentary elections were held as a preliminary step towards independence, which would be agreed in the Viénot Agreement in late 1936, but never ratified by the French.

== Background ==
In 1918, towards the end of World War I, the Ottoman Empire's forces withdrew from Syria after being defeated by the Allied Powers (Great Britain and France) and their Hashemite Arab allies from the Hejaz. The British had promised the Hashemites control over a united Arab state consisting of the bulk of Arabic-speaking lands from which the Ottomans withdrew, even as the Allies made other plans for the region in the 1916 Sykes–Picot Agreement.

The idea of Syrian and Arab independence were not entirely new concepts. French forces entering Syria faced resistance from local factions in the north in 1919, with the prominent Alawite sheikh Saleh al-Ali launching a revolt in the coastal mountain range and Ibrahim Hananu leading a revolt in Aleppo and the surrounding countryside. The leaders of both uprisings were supportive of the creation of a united Syrian state presided over by Emir Faisal, the son of Sharif Husayn. In March 1920 the Hashemites officially established the Kingdom of Syria with Faisal as king and the capital in Damascus.

In the April 1920 San Remo Conference, the Allies were granted control over the Ottoman Empire's former Arab territories by the newly formed League of Nations, with Britain taking control of Palestine, Transjordan and Iraq, while France took control of Syria. This transfer of authority from the Ottomans to the French was generally unwelcome to Greater Syria's inhabitants, with the exception of some of the local Christian communities, particularly the Maronites of Mount Lebanon. The brief Franco-Syrian War saw the Hashemites' pan-Arab forces defeated by the French in the Battle of Maysalun on 23 July, and the kingdom dissolved. France then divided the country into several autonomous entities: State of Damascus, State of Aleppo, Greater Lebanon, Alawite State and Jabal Druze State. But many nationalists remained in Syria, advocating for independence. There was disquiet, even in Britain, when France claimed Lebanon and Syria as "colonies".

== Causes ==
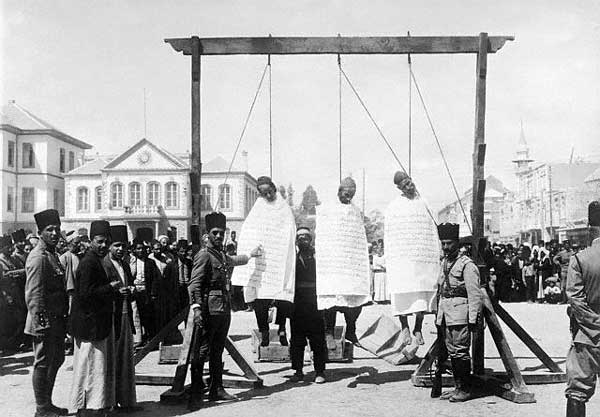
Dead bodies of the Syrian rebels, killed by the French Army in 1925, placed in Marjeh Square

=== Alienation of the elite ===
One major reason behind the outbreak of the Great Syrian Revolt was the French relationship with the local elites. The Ottoman Empire, especially in its final centuries, had allowed much authority to devolve to the local level with many day-to-day administrative functions carried out by local notables. The Ottoman millet system allowed local peoples of different religious affiliations to uphold their own legal standards (for example, sharia law applying to Muslims, but not Jews, Catholics, or Orthodox Christians).

The European powers, however, had little grasp of the intricacies of Ottoman government, and failed to recognize that the disappearance of national authority did not mean that administration ceased to exist on a local level. In the Mandate of Syria, the French assumed that the Syrians were incapable of practicing self-government, and so instituted a system which ostensibly served to train Syrians in that responsibility. French administrators were assigned to all levels of government, and their role was, officially, to train Syrian counterparts in that particular function.

The reality of the situation was very different. Instead of teaching, the advisors performed the functions of that office. The effect was local rulers who resented being treated as if they did not know how to perform the functions they had been performing for centuries and who opposed this usurpation of their power. Further, authority had traditionally resided in the hands of a few families, while European administrators abandoned the systems of caste and class, undermining this elite by opening up offices to the general public.

=== Loyalty of tribes ===
Outside of cities, the French were not entirely successful in winning over nomadic populations, many of whom raised the standard of revolt in 1925. The Ottoman Empire had initiated the process of tribal sedentarization, but it was not until the French Mandate of Syria that tribes began to lose their nomadic lifestyle.

After World War I, the territory that tribes wandered was divided between Turkey, the Mandate of Syria, and the Mandate of Mesopotamia, each controlled by different powers, thereby limiting their freedom of movement. In Syria, the process of industrialization was swift; roads were quickly built, cars and buses became commonplace. The situation for nomads was exacerbated by an influx of Armenians and Kurds from the new country of Turkey, who settled in the Mandate's northern regions.

To pacify, or at least control, the tribes, the French instituted several restrictive measures; for example, tribes could not carry arms in settled areas, and had to pay lump taxes on livestock. Additionally, the French attempted to bribe tribal leaders; but while this worked in some cases, it caused resentment in others. When the Great Syrian Revolt broke out in 1925, thousands of tribesmen were eager to fight against the French.

=== Nationalist sentiment ===
Syrian nationalism was fostered in Faisal's short-lived kingdom, but after its dissolution many nationalists affiliated with his government fled the country to avoid death sentences, arrest and harassment by the French. Some went to Amman, where they found Amir Abdullah sympathetic to their cause; but under increasing pressure from the British, the young Abdullah drove them from Transjordan. These rejoined other Syrian nationalists at Cairo In 1921, when the Syrian-Palestinian Congress was founded.

In 1925, in preparation for upcoming elections, high commissioner General Maurice Sarrail allowed the organization of political parties. The Syrian-Palestinian Congress had proved itself an ineffectual body, and its Syrian factions returned to Syria. They founded the People's Party in Damascus, which was characterized by an intelligentsia leadership antagonistic toward local elites, with no social or economic programs, with support organized around individuals. Though unprepared for and not expecting an uprising, the nationalist elements in Damascus were eager to participate when one arose.

=== Mistreatment of the Druze population ===
The spark that ignited the Great Syrian Revolt was French treatment of the Druze population. In 1923, the leaders of Jabal al-Druze, a region in the southeast of the Mandate of Syria, had come to an agreement with French authorities, hoping for the same degree of autonomy they had enjoyed under the Ottoman Empire.

Druze society was governed by a council of notables, the majlis, who selected one of their number to a limited executive position. Traditionally, this role had been dominated by the al-Atrash family since the defeat of the Lebanese Druze in 1860. But in 1923, shortly after the agreement made with the French, Selim al-Atrash resigned. Seizing upon the disunity of the al-Atrash family in selecting a successor, the majlis struck at their power by choosing a French officer of the Service des Renseignements, Captain Cabrillet. Though he was initially only appointed for three months, later his term was extended indefinitely.

Captain Cabrillet embarked upon a series of successful modernization reforms, but in the process, he collected Druze taxes in full, disarmed the population, and used the forced labor of prisoners and peasants, upsetting a significant part of the population. In the meantime, Sultan al-Atrash, the most ambitious member of the al-Atrash family, sent a delegation to Beirut to inform the French High Commissioner, General Maurice Sarrail, that Captain Cabrillet's actions were antagonizing most of the Druze population. Instead of hearing the delegates, Sarrail imprisoned them. Upon hearing of this, the Druze returned their support to the al-Atrash family, which by this point was backing Sultan al-Atrash, and rebelled against the French (and indirectly against the majlis, who had elevated them to power).

== Course of the war ==
Initially, the French were ill-equipped to respond to the outbreak of violence. In 1925, the number of French troops in the Mandate of Syria was at its lowest ever, numbering only 14,397 men and officers, with an additional 5,902 Syrian auxiliaries, down from 70,000 in 1920. In 1924, the French representative reporting to the Permanent Mandates Commission in 1924 wrote that “the little state of Djebel-Druze [is] of small importance and [has] only about 50,000 inhabitants.” Consequently, the Druze, when they revolted in September 1925 met with great success, and after a series of victories, including the annihilation of a French relief column, captured the fort at al-Suwayda.

Instead of engaging the Druze in the winter, the French decided to temporarily withdraw, a decision noted by the new high commissioner, Henry de Jouvenel, to be a tactical error, as it underrepresented French military strength and encouraged a regional rebellion to achieve national dimensions. Indeed, the weak immediate response of the French invited the intervention of disaffected local elite, tribesmen, and loosely connected nationalists based in Damascus.

First to seize upon the opportunity presented by the revolt were the nomadic tribes, who used the absence of French authority – troops had been drawn away to concentrate on the rebelling region – to prey upon farmers and merchants, thereby creating an atmosphere of sympathy for the rebellious Druze.

The nationalists seized upon the Druze revolt in relatively short order, forging an alliance with Sultan al-Atrash within six weeks of the uprising's commencement, and establishing a National Provisional Government in Jabal-Druze with al-Atrash as President and Dr. Abd al-Rahman Shahbandar, leader of the People's Party, as Vice President.

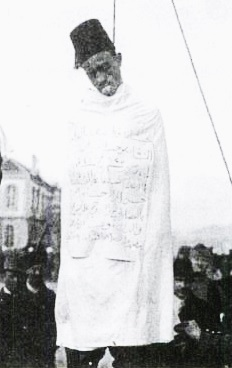
Rebel commander Fakhri al-Kharrat, son of Hasan al-Kharrat, hanged by the French in January 1926.

In response to the outbreak of violence, Jouvenal declared free and popular elections for every area that had not been affected by the rebellion in the beginning of 1926. Most elections were held peacefully. However, in two cities, Homs and Hama, the local elites refused to allow elections to be held. A two-day uprising led by Fawzi al-Qawuqji and largely supported by the local population occurred in Hama on 4–5 October 1925. This was followed in September 1926 by a full-fledged insurrection. French forces rushed to put down the new threat, which gave the rebellion added life elsewhere. At the time, the lack of troops meant that for the French to focus on Homs and Hama, they had to neglect other regions, allowing the revolt to spread. Within two months the Homs-Hama region fell, but the conflict there bought rebels elsewhere much-needed breathing room, and taught the rebels in Damascus a valuable lesson about troop placement.

Despite the revolts in Homs and Hama, the turn-out for the elections suggested to the French that the Syrian people had a desire for peace; in the rural areas around Homs and Hama, where no violence was reported, voter turn-out was 95%. Further, it revealed that many of the belligerents were local elites, and when full amnesty was again offered in February 1926, the entire country, with the exception of Jebal-Druze and Damascus, was pacified.

The lessons the rebels learned from Homs and Hama were many, and that sustained the rebellion for a further year and a half. Homs and Hama were lost because the rebels concentrated their forces in the face of overwhelming French firepower, because they fortified their position and waited for the French to arrive, and because they made no attempt to sever French lines of communication. In Damascus, the rebels were dispersed, so that no random artillery fire would defeat them. Further, when the Druze attacked Damascus, they did so from several directions. Both groups repeatedly cut French lines of communication, and while the French suffered few difficulties in restoring them, the psychological effect the destruction had on them was significant.

Despite the breadth of the rebellion and the initial rebel successes, the persistence of the French made its defeat inevitable. By early 1926, they had increased their troop numbers to 50,000, roughly the size of the total Druze population. By spring, much of Damascus had been destroyed by artillery fire, and the nationalist leadership had been forced into exile. In the spring of the following year, the Druze were decisively defeated, and Sultan al-Atrash went into exile in Transjordan to escape the death penalty.

== Leaders and regional hotspots ==
=== Sultan al-Atrash in the Jabal al-Arab and Hauran ===
Participants in the 1925 Great Syrian Revolt

Sultan al-Atrash was a prominent Syrian nationalist leader and commander general of the Syrian Revolution (1925–27), He fought against the Ottomans, the French, and even against the Syrian government during its dictatorship, One of the most influential figures in Syrian and Druze history, he played a major role in deciding the destiny of Jabal al-Druze and of Syria in general.

Al-Atrash was born in Al-Qurayya, a village south of As Suwayda known for the famous Druze family of Al-Atrash, which had nominally governed the region since 1879, his father Zuqan led the Hauran Druze Rebellion against the Ottomans near Al-Kafr in 1910, where he faced the forces of Sami Pasha al-Farouqi. He was captured and later executed in 1911. His son, Mansur al-Atrash was an active member in the Syrian Regional Branch of the Ba'ath Party until the 1966 Syrian coup d'état led to the downfall of Michel Aflaq, Salah al-Din al-Bitar, Munif Razzaz and the classical Ba'athists in general. His granddaughter, Naila Al Atrash, is a dramatist and activist against the Assad regime.

In 1925 Sultan al-Atrash led a revolt which broke out in the Jabal al-Druze and spread to engulf the whole of Syria and parts of Lebanon, this is considered one of the most important revolutions against the French mandate, as it encompassed the whole of Syria and witnessed fierce battles between rebel and French forces.

The rebel forces led by Sultan al-Atrash were supported by the Communist Party of Syria and Lebanon (CPSL). The CPSL broadcast in French, Arabic and Armenian languages that the rebellion was in support of "the great Syrian Revolution" and coordinated with "the international communist movement".

On 23 August 1925 Sultan al-Atrash officially declared revolution against France, and soon fighting erupted in Damascus, Homs and Hama. Al-Atrash won several battles against the French at the beginning of the revolution, notably the Battle of al-Kafr on 21 July 1925, the Battle of al-Mazraa on 2 August 1925, and the battles of Salkhad, al-Musayfirah and As-Suwayda. The Druze were defeated in the last two battles. After rebel victories against France, it sent thousands of troops to Syria and Lebanon from Morocco and Senegal, equipped with modern weapons, compared to the few supplies of the rebels. This dramatically altered the results and allowed the French to regain many cities although resistance lasted until the spring of 1927. The French sentenced Sultan al-Atrash to death, but he had escaped with the rebels to Transjordan and was eventually pardoned, He returned to Syria in 1937 after the signing of the Franco-Syrian Treaty the year before.

Al-Atrash participated actively in the Levant Crisis, that led to Syrian independence. In 1948 he called for the establishment of a unified Arab Liberation Army of Palestine, for which hundreds of young people had already volunteered and sent to participate in during the 1948 Arab–Israeli War.

During the reign of Adib Shishakli, Al-Atrash was often harassed because of his opposition to government policy, he left the Jabal al-Druze for Jordan in December 1954 and came back when Adib Shishakl's regime fell, Al-Atrash supported the United Arab Republic of Egypt and Syria in 1958, and firmly opposed the process of separation in 1961. He is also known for his contributions to social life and development in the Jabal al-Druze.

Al-Atrash died on 26 March 1982 from a heart attack. His funeral was attended by more than a million people, and the president of Syrian Arab Republic, Hafez al-Assad issued an individual letter mourning Al-Atrash as the General Commander of the Great Syrian Revolt.

=== Abd al-Rahman Shahbandar in Damascus ===
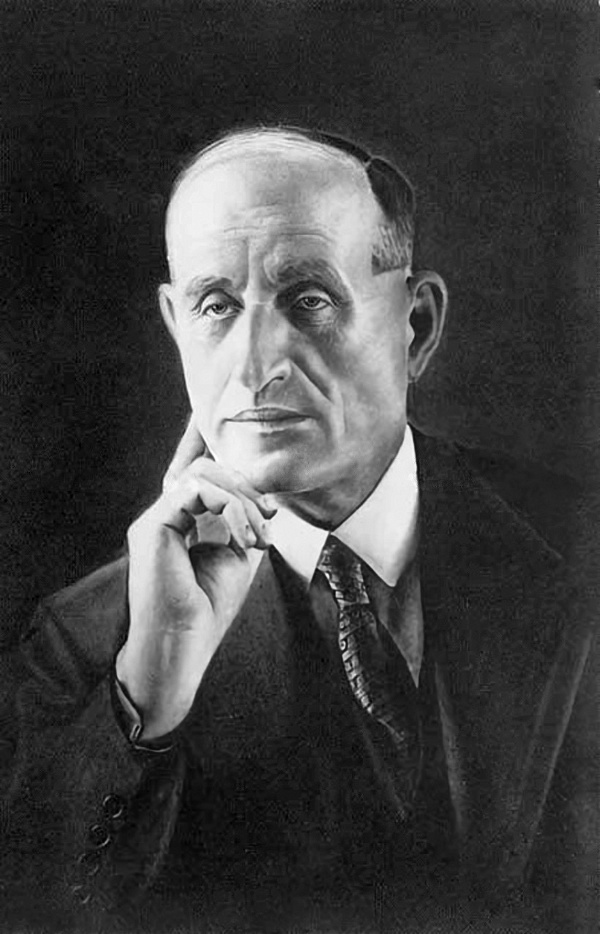
Abd al-Rahman Shahbandar

Abd al-Rahman Shahbandar was a prominent Syrian nationalist during the French mandate and a leading opponent of compromise with French authority. His devotion to Arab nationalism dated to the days of the Committee of Union and Progress and its Turkification policies. He supported the Arab Revolt during the First World War and briefly headed the foreign ministry under Emir Faisal.

When France occupied Syria in July 1920, he fled the country. Shahbandar returned in 1921 and organized the Iron Hand Society to agitate against French rule. This was the first Syrian nationalist group to emerge in Damascus during the Mandate and Shahbandar organized its spread to Homs and Hama. In April 1922, the French arrested him and other Iron Hand leaders for incitement against their rule. The arrests triggered several demonstrations and bloody confrontations between protesters and French forces in Damascus. Nonetheless, the French tried Shahbandar for subversive activities and sentenced him to 20 years of imprisonment.

After serving 18 months of his sentence, the French sent him into exile, where he joined the activities of the Syrian-Palestine Congress based in Cairo. The French allowed him to return to Syria in 1924. The following year Shahbandar guided the formation of Syria's first nationalist party, the People's Party. He then helped organize the spread of the Syrian Revolution from Jabal Druze State to the rest of Syria. He eluded the French authorities and moved to Jabal al-Druze for the duration of the revolt. There he and Sultan al-Atrash formed a provisional government. When the revolution collapsed in 1927, Shahbandar fled to Transjordan and from there to Egypt.

In 1937 a French amnesty allowed him to return from exile, and he directed his supporters to oppose the Franco-Syrian Treaty of Independence because it granted France privileges that detracted from Syrian sovereignty. He was joined by powerful Syrian politicians such as Munir al-Ajlani. He also directed a political campaign to discredit the National Bloc government of Prime Minister Jamil Mardam Bey. During the Second World War, the French considered cooperating with Shahbandar because of his opposition to the National Bloc and because of support for him from Britain and the Hashemites. In June 1940, he was assassinated in Damascus. The French accused several prominent National Bloc figures, including Jamil Mardam and Saadallah al-Jabiri, of plotting the murder, and they fled to Iraq. While Shahbandar was one of Syria's most popular leaders, he never built up an organization that would perpetuate his political legacy.

=== Hasan al-Kharrat in the Ghouta of Damascus ===
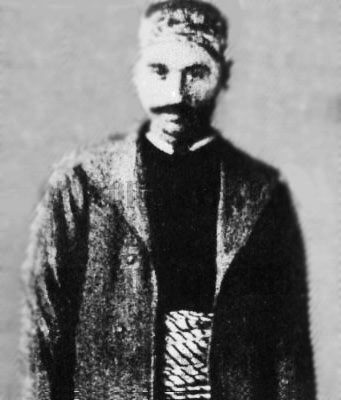
Hasan al-Kharrat

Hasan al-Kharrat was one of the principal Syrian rebel commanders of the Great Syrian Revolt against the French mandate. His main area of operations was in Damascus and its Ghouta countryside. He was killed in the struggle and is considered a hero by Syrians.

As the qabaday (local youths boss) of the Al-Shaghur quarter of Damascus, al-Kharrat was connected with Nasib al-Bakri, a nationalist from the quarter's most influential family. At al-Bakri's invitation, al-Kharrat joined the revolt in August 1925 and formed a group of fighters from Al-Shaghur and other neighbourhoods in the vicinity. He led the rebel assault against Damascus, briefly capturing the residence of French High Commissioner of the Levant, Maurice Sarrail before withdrawing amid heavy French bombardment.

Towards the end of 1925, relations grew tense between al-Kharrat and other rebel leaders, particularly Sa'id al-As and Ramadan al-Shallash, as they traded accusations of plundering villages or extorting local inhabitants. Al-Kharrat continued to lead operations in the Ghouta, ultimately killed in a French ambush. The revolt dissipated by 1927, but he gained a lasting reputation as a martyr of the Syrian resistance to French rule.

=== Ayash Al-Haj in Deir ez-Zor ===
Ayyash Al-Haj

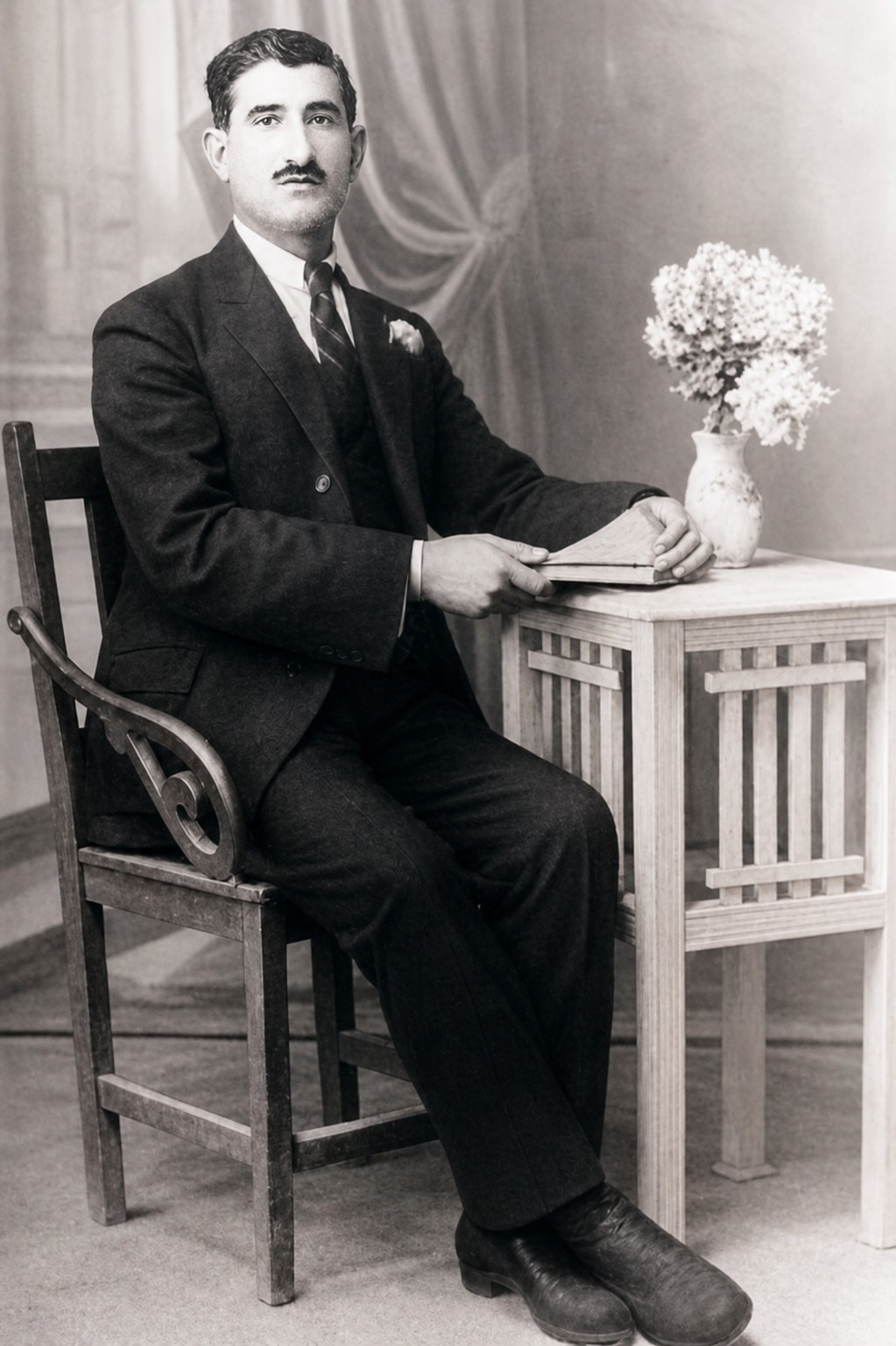
Mohammed Al-Ayyash

French newspaper article linking the killing of the two French officers, Vannières and Wysocki, near Deir ez-Zor in 1925 to Mohammed Al-Ayyash, and referring to his coordination with Dr. Abd al-Rahman Shahbandar and the People's Party in Damascus. Journal des Débats politiques et littéraires, 10 November 1925, p. 2. View article.

The Ayyash Al-Haj family was subjected to the brutality of the French military authorities after accusing them of preparing for the revolution of the Euphrates valley in conjunction with the outbreak of the Great Syrian Revolution. The struggle of the family began with the meeting of Mohammed Al-Ayyash, the eldest son of leader Ayyash Al-Haj, with Abd al-Rahman Shahbandar, leader of the People's Party in Damascus and they agreed to extend the revolution to the Euphrates region and open a new front against the French to disperse their forces and ease the pressure on the rebels of Ghouta and Jabal al-Druze.

After Mohammed Al-Ayyash returned from Damascus he started to rouse the enthusiasm of the people of Deir ez-Zor and encourage them to fight. He agreed with his brother Mahmoud Al-Ayyash (Abu Stita) to go to the villages of the Albu Saraya clan that were living west of Deir ez-Zor, and which had a strong friendship with his father Ayyash Al-Haj, to form revolutionary groups with them to strike the French forces.

Mohammed Al-Ayyash managed to form a revolutionary group of thirteen armed men who were ready to take military action against the French forces. Some people were working with the French at translation centres and other places but they were at the service of the revolutionaries. They were reporting to Mohammed Al-Ayyash about the situation and movements of the French, and their activities, along the timing of their military operations. Mohammed Al-Ayyash led the revolutionaries against the French forces.

The revolutionaries managed to carry out strikes against the French, and the last attack was on a car carrying officers and their driver in the Ain Albu Gomaa area, on the road between Deir ez-Zor and Raqqa. The revolutionaries attacked and arrested the officers and took them with their car, first taking their weapons, to a desert called Al-Aksiyya, and threw them, with their driver, in one of the abandoned wells where they died.

The French, concerned over losing their officers, began a search campaign, including planes. When they found their bodies and inquired from the informants about the names of the revolutionaries, they sent a large military force equipped with heavy guns and planes to attack the Albu Saraya clan and blockade it.

French planes began bombing the villages of the clan. Some civilians were killed and among them were Hanash Al-Mousa Al-Ani, Ali Al-Najras, and a woman who was pregnant, many were wounded by bullets and shrapnel., All of this was to pressure on the people to surrender the revolutionaries.

Eventually the French became convinced that the bombing would not work. They then threatened to arrest the women of the revolutionaries, their mothers and sisters until the revolutionaries surrendered themselves, When the revolutionaries heard the news, they emerged from their hideouts and surrendered.

The revolutionaries were tried in Aleppo, where the family of Ayyash Al-Haj appointed the lawyer, Fathallah Al-Saqqal to defend her, The court heard the head of the French intelligence in Deir ez-Zor, who said: If each of the criminals, who committed this terrible offence deserve dying once, the gang leader Mohammed Al-Ayyash deserves hanging twice.

=== Ibrahim Hanano in Idlib ===
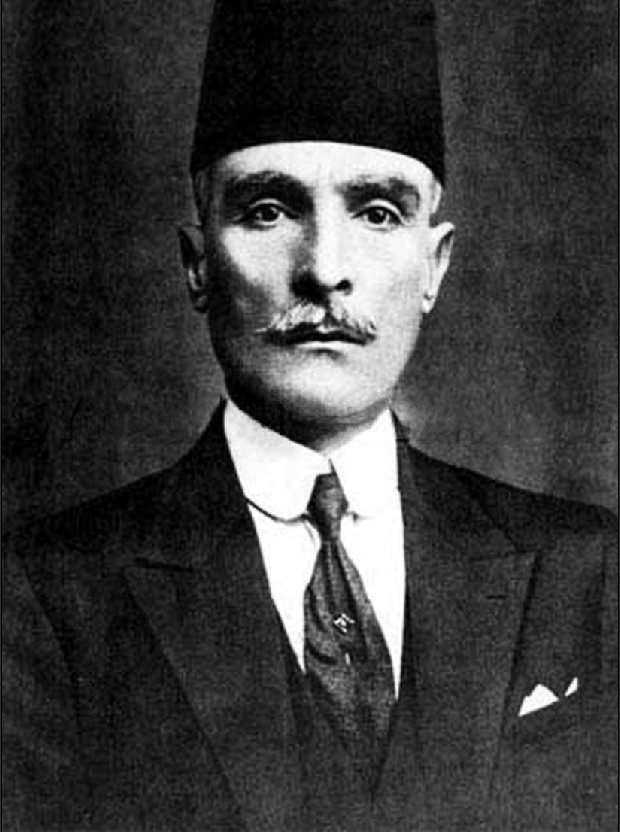
Ibrahim Hananu

Ibrahim Hananu was born to a wealthy family in Kafr Takharim and raised in Aleppo. There is dispute on his birth date: one source mentions he was born in 1879, while another mentions he was born in 1869. He studied at the Imperial High School in Aleppo, and continued his studies at the Ottoman Law Academy of the prestigious Mülkiye school in Constantinople. As a student, he joined the Committee of Union and Progress, the political organ that later took stage following the Young Turk Revolution of 1908.

Breaking out in the autumn of 1919 in the countryside surrounding Aleppo, when the French army had landed on the Syrian coast and was preparing to occupy all of Syria, Hananu launched his revolt, bringing Aleppo, Idlib and Antioch into a coordinated campaign against French forces. Hananu was responsible for the disarmament of many French troops, the destruction of railroads and telegraph lines, the sabotage of tanks, and the foiling of French attacks on Aleppo. On 23 July 1920, when the French army successfully attacked Aleppo, Hananu was forced to retreat to his village of Kafr Takharim Nahiyah and began to reorganize the revolt with Najeeb Oweid. The rebels decided to form a civilian government based in Armanaz Nahiyah, and sent Hananu to Turkey as a representative of the new civilian government to request for aid in fighting against the French. He received aid from the Turkish nationalist movement of Mustafa Kemal Atatürk, which was battling the French Army of the Levant for control of Cilicia and southern Anatolia. With the withdrawal of Turkish military assistance following the signing of the Franklin-Bouillon Agreement in October 1921, Hananu and his men could no longer sustain a revolt, and their struggle collapsed. However, the revolt's failure, the organization of the northern areas of Syria with Turkish help, has been interpreted as a prototype for self-government that Hananu and other Syrians built upon in later years.

In 1922 Ibrahim Hananu was arrested and presented to the French military criminal court on criminal acts. The first session of the court was on 15 March 1922. One of the best lawyers at that time, Fathallah Saqqal defended Hananu, advocated for Hananu's innocence, and argued that Hananu was a political opponent, not a criminal.

On 25 March 1922, the French Attorney General requested the execution of Hananu, and he said, "if Hananu has seven heads, I will cut them all," the French judge ultimately released Hananu following an agreement between Hananu and the French government.

=== Fawzi al-Qawuqji in Hama ===
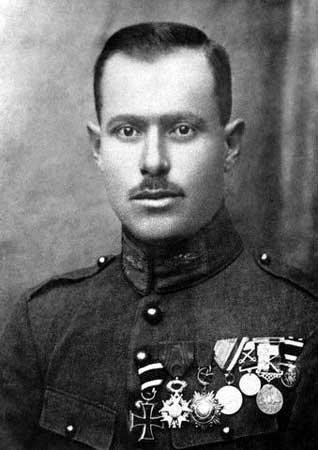
Fawzi al-Qawuqji

Fawzi al-Qawuqji was an officer in the Syrian army and the leader of the Salvation Army during the 1948 war, was born in the city of Tripoli in the Ottoman Empire, studied at the Military School in Astana, and graduated as an officer in the Ottoman Cavalry Corps in 1912, worked in the service of King Faisal in Damascus.

Fawzi al-Qawuqji lived in Damascus and was distinguished by his rare courage and Arabism that prompted him to fight battles against European colonialism in all Arab regions.

During the French Mandate, he became commander of a cavalry company in Hama, later defected from the Syrian Legion set up by the French in Syria to participate in the Great Syrian Revolution against the French, and on October 4, 1925, he led a revolution in Hama against the French occupation, which he planned jointly with Saeed Al-Termanini and Munir Al-Rayes. The Syrian revolutionaries took control of the city, the third-largest city in Syria, with about 80,000. The revolutionaries cut the telephone lines and attacked and burned the Government House, where they captured some French officers and then besieged the French military positions.

The next day, France bombarded the city with aircraft and artillery for three days. After negotiations, some of the city's notables persuaded al-Qawuqji to withdraw to save the population's blood, and the battles continued in its vicinity. The bombing of Hama resulted in 344 deaths, the vast majority of them civilians, although France claimed that the death toll did not exceed 76, all of whom were revolutionaries. Some sources estimate the number of civilian casualties at about 500, the losses of the French as 400 dead and wounded, and the losses of the rebels 35; the material losses were also great, as 115 shops were destroyed. He was later assigned to lead the revolution in the Ghouta area of Damascus.

== Aftermath ==
The revolution achieved only some progress in the national struggle for independence from France. However, Syrians had failed in their primary goal of independence and the removal of French forces from Syria. French forces suppressed the revolution through extensive military repression, including the use of militarized warfare against civilians. The conflict also likely led to an increase in Syrian nationalism and unity. The revolt also occurred concurrently with discussions about restoring a Hashemite monarchy in Syria. In February 1926, Iraqi foreign minister Nuri al-Sa'id proposed Ali bin al-Hussein as a candidate for the presupposed Syrian throne. Ali then discussed the proposal with French officials in Beirut. The proposed restoration did not take place. Nevertheless, the revolt reshaped relations between French authorities and Syrian political elites. In the aftermath, French officials increasingly cooperated with moderate Syrian nationalists in an effort to keep social order. This took inspiration from elements of the political and social hierarchy from the Ottoman period, even as the revolt had demonstrated the capacity of groups outside the established urban leadership to challenge colonial authority.

Despite the defeat, the revolt contributed to the development of Syrian national identity. According to historian Michael Provence, commercial and educational networks established during the Ottoman period helped connect communities. These commercial and educational networks allowed participants to envision themselves as members of a common Syrian nation. These networks continued to influence Syrian politics into the next decades. Provence traces connections between the families and communities involved in the revolt and the emergence of Ba'athist nationalism in the 1940s. Early Ba'athist figures, including Michel Aflaq and Salah al-Din al-Bitar, came from families involved with the grain trade between Damascus and southern Syria. Provence also adds that the commercial relationship between the grain-producing Ḥawrān region and the al-Maydān quarter of Damascus was particularly important in keeping these connections. The revolt's legacy thus extended beyond its immediate political outcome, contributing to the social communities through which later Syrian nationalist movements developed.

== Casualties ==
The death toll of the Great Syrian Revolt reached 4,213 people, distributed in the following Syrian governorates:

- 315 dead in Aleppo and Idlib
- 331 dead in Latakia, Tartus and the coast
- 731 dead in Damascus and Ghouta
- 150 dead in Hama
- 250 dead in Homs, Al-Nabek and An-Nabek District (Rif Dimashq Governorate)
- 71 dead in Deir ez-Zor and Al Jazira
- 34 dead in Daraa
- 2,064 dead in Jabal al-Druze
- 267 dead in the Al-Balan region, Rashaya, Majdal Shams and the surrounding villages

== Memorials ==
The edifice of the Great Syrian Revolution is located in the town of Al-Qurayya, 15 km (9.3 mi) south of the city of As-Suwayda which is the birthplace of the leader of the revolution, Sultan al-Atrash. The edifice's construction began in 1987, and was opened in 2010 with an area of 6,200 m^{2} (67,000 sq ft), and includes the construction of the edifice and its annexes on a site of 2,800 m^{2} (30,000 sq ft). The building of the edifice consists of in its ground section the General Museum of the Great Syrian Revolution edifice, which is considered a living witness to the revolutionaries' exploits and heroism in the face of French colonialism.

Next to the museum is located in the centre of the edifice a central hall that houses the remains of the commander in chief of the Great Syrian Revolution, the Mujahid Sultan al-Atrash, in addition to a mosaic panorama embodying the battles of the revolution and paintings documenting the names of the battles and the martyrs who were killed in them, in addition to an administration room, a library, and a special museum for the commander in chief containing the Arab dress. His complete cloak, dress, waistcoat, jacket, hat, weapons and military equipment, including a military rifle, a machine gun that he used, a hunting rifle, four machine guns, a French rifle, a leather belt to store bullets, a wooden stick in the form of a pin and some bullets, in addition to National Order of the Cedar that he was awarded, as well as two French swords, one of which belongs to a campaign leader. Blasphemy General Norman, a third sword sheath, two field phones, a signal pistol, three bullets, a detonator, a machine gun, and aircraft counters.

== See also ==
- Saleh al-Ali
- Iraqi Revolt
