= Battle of al-Musayfirah =

Battle in 1925 during the Great Syrian Revolt

Coordinates: 32°37′35″N 36°20′36″E

- Part of The Great Syrian Revolt
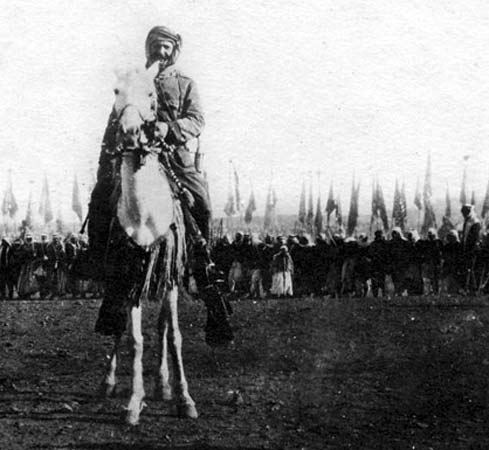
- Sheikh Hilal al-Atrash during a rebel ceremony in Hauran on 14 August 1925.
| Date | 17 September 1925 |
| Location | Al-Musayfirah, Hauran, Mandatory Syria |
| Result | French victory |

Belligerents
| France: Army of the Levant; French Air Force | Syria: Druze |

Commanders and leaders
| (France) Gen. Maurice Gamelin (France) Col. Charles Andréa (France) Capt. Landriau (France) Maj. Kratzert | Sultan al-Atrash |

Strength
| 600–800 (Gamelin's troops numbered 8,000 but arrived after the battle) | 2,500 |

Casualties and losses
| 47 dead 83 wounded | 300–500 deaths 500 wounded and captured (later executed) |

The Battle of al-Musayfirah (also spelled Battle of Messifre or Battle of Moussiefre) was one of the major military engagements between Druze rebels in the Hauran and the French Army on 17 September 1925, during the early stage of the Great Syrian Revolt, which continued until 1927. After initial rebel victories against French forces at al-Kafr and then al-Mazraa, an advance guard of the French Army, then under the leadership of General Maurice Gamelin, was dispatched to the village of al-Musayfirah on 15 September. After clearing the village of its inhabitants, they set up fortifications in preparation for an assault on al-Suwayda.

The battle commenced on 16 September when Druze rebels launched an early morning attack against French positions. Unable to significantly breach French lines, the rebels experienced heavy casualties after sunrise when they were consistently bombarded by French aircraft for three hours. The rebels subsequently withdrew, although a number were captured by French forces prior. Several of al-Musayfirah's residents were also killed before and during the battle. The French victory, the first significant one during the revolt, paved the way for their capture of al-Suwayda on 24 September, although they withdrew two months later due to inhospitable conditions.

== Background ==
After the defeat of the Ottomans and their subsequent withdrawal from Syria, the country was occupied by France in 1918, and later established the French Mandate over the area. It set up several autonomous entities (Damascus State, Aleppo State, Greater Lebanon, Alawite State and Jabal Druze State). The latter comprised the predominantly Druze-inhabited Jabal al-Arab (also known as Jabal al-Druze) region in southeastern Syria, east of the Hauran.

Although the Druze leadership at the time favored autonomous rule from Damascus, tensions developed when the inhabitants viewed the increasing involvement of the French authorities as overriding interference in their affairs and a way of undermining the Jabal's traditional leadership, particularly the al-Atrash family. From 1922, a number of incidents involving the two sides eventually led to the Druze leader Sultan Pasha al-Atrash declaring an uprising against the French in July 1925, which became known as the Great Syrian Revolt. The Druze won important battles at al-Kafr and al-Mazraa in mid and late July and the defeated French forces came under the new leadership of Maurice Gamelin who arrived in Damascus in mid-September to assemble his troops in preparation for a move against al-Musayfirah, located west of the Jabal, and from there al-Suwayda, the principal city of the Jabal.

Al-Musayfirah's inhabitants had accepted the rule of the Mandate and conceded to the imposition of taxes by the French authorities, which to the latter, was enough to consider it a "submitted" village, as opposed to a rebellious one. However, during the uprising, the residents of al-Musayfirah hosted the rebels, gaining the ire of the government. The village was now seen as "treasonous" by the authorities and thus liable to the harshest punishment: execution of the majority of male residents and demolition of homes. In general, most villages along the front lines of the Hauran were in an awkward position, having to possibly face retribution from either the authorities for providing safe haven to the rebels or from the rebels themselves for not agreeing to host them. However, executions were rarely administered by the rebels as a punitive measure against uncooperative villages.

== Battle ==
On 15 September al-Musayfirah was occupied by 600–800 French troops, initially coming from the Foreign Legion which was divided into the 5th Battalion of the 4th Foreign Infantry Regiment (4e REI) commanded by Major Kratzert and the 4th Squadron of the 1st Foreign Cavalry Regiment (REC) commanded by Captain Landriau. These troops formed an advance force dispatched by General Gamelin. Upon their arrival, al-Musayfirah's residents were either expelled or killed. The French forces promptly began to establish fortifications in the village, building stone walls, digging trenches and setting up barbed wire and machine gun turrets. A few days before, the rebel leaders had convened in 'Ara to the east and, apparently with prior knowledge of the French attempt to take over al-Musayfirah, planned to attack them there. An informant from the meeting had notified the French authorities, who were now expecting an attack by Druze forces.

Seeking to attack French positions before the bulk of Gamelin's army from Damascus arrived to the village, the rebels made a charge against al-Musayfirah on 16 September. While they were able to consistently charge against French positions for around 10 hours, they were successfully repulsed by French machine gun fire each time. The rebels launched a second major assault in the early morning of 17 September, but once more, no significant number of rebels were able to breach French lines. However, a number of rebels managed to ambush French legionnaires in al-Musayfirah's narrow streets. This part of the battle was largely marked by hand-to-hand fighting, despite the bulk of the French forces being cavalry-based. After sunrise, French aircraft bombarded rebel forces 27 times within the span of three hours. A French rescue column, consisting of a battalion of the 16th (or the 18th) Tirailleurs under the commanded of Colonel Charles Andréa arrived in the evening hours.

== Aftermath ==
By the end of the battle, several hundred Druze fighters were slain, although the sources vary about the actual figure with Michael Provence stating it was between 300 and 400, while Jean-Denis Lepage writing it was close to 500. Among the deceased rebels was the local chief of Rasas, Sheikh Salman Hamza as well as his four sons. On the French side, 47 soldiers were killed and 83 wounded, while all the French cavalry horses were lost, despite not being utilized. There were also about 500 wounded Druze who were captured after the battle as prisoners of war. They were ordered by Andréa to pile up the slain rebels and residents of al-Musayfirah in front of the village to serve as an example. The POWs were subsequently executed. The battle of al-Musayfirah marked the first French victory during the revolt.

General Gamelin arrived at al-Musayfirah on 19 September via the rail station at Izra'. On 21 September Gamelin's 8,000 troops marched to al-Suwayda. After minimal resistance, the French captured the city but returned to al-Musayfirah after two months, due to the virtual desertion by al-Suwayda's inhabitants, the lack of water and the surrounding rebel-dominated mountainous countryside. Although many Druze leaders surrendered to French rule after the rebels' defeat at al-Musayfirah, these submissions did not hold once the French withdrew from al-Suwayda and the Jabal al-Arab region. The withdrawal was perceived by the rebels and their sympathizers throughout Syria as a victory over the French army.

A monument was later erected in al-Musayfirah to honor the rebels' efforts during the battle.

== Bibliography ==
- Betts, Robert Brenton (2010). The Druze. Yale University Press. ISBN 978-0300048100.
- Lepage, Jean-Denis G. G. (2008). French Foreign Legion: An Illustrated History. McFarland. ISBN 978-0786462537.
- Provence, Michael (2005). The Great Syrian Revolt and the Rise of Arab Nationalism. University of Texas Press. ISBN 9780292706804.
