= Battle of al-Mazraa =

Coordinates: 32°47′3″N 36°28′59″E

- Part of The Great Syrian Revolt
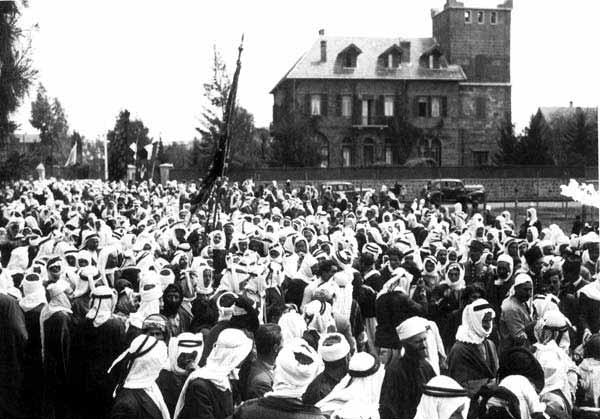
- Sultan Pasha al-Atrash's return from exile, 1937
| Date | 2–3 August 1925 |
| Location | al-Mazraa, Jabal al-Druze |
| Result | Druze victory |

Belligerents
| France: Army of the Levant | Druze and Bedouin rebels |

Commanders and leaders
| (France) Gen. Roger Michaud (France) Maj. Jean Aujac † | Sultan Pasha al-Atrash |

Strength
| 3,500 French and colonial troops (infantry, cavalry, armored cars, artillery) | 500 (cavalry) |

Casualties and losses
| 601 fatalities, 428 wounded | |

The Battle of al-Mazra'a (Arabic: معركة المزرعة) was one of the major battles of the Great Syrian Revolt, that led to the spread of the rebellion throughout the French Mandate of Syria. It was fought on 2–3 August 1925 between Druze and Bedouin rebels led by Sultan Pasha al-Atrash and a heavily armed French force of the Army of the Levant near the town of al-Mazraa, around 12 kilometres (7.5 mi) northwest of the city of al-Suwayda.

== Prelude ==
France established its Mandate in Syria in 1920 following the Allied victory over the Ottoman Empire during World War I; from which France gained the territory of modern-day Syria. French authority over the area was finalized after their decisive victory over Emir Faisal's forces in the Battle of Maysalun on 24 July 1920. The French authorities divided the territory of Syria into separate autonomous entities based on the different sects in the country, including the Jabal al-Druze area of Hauran with its Druze majority of 90%. While the Druze, unlike their Arab Christian and Arab Sunni counterparts, were not as active in the Syrian nationalist movement during the early years of the Mandate, they feared the consequences of French rule. Because of their conflict with the Maronites of Lebanon who maintained close ties with the French before World War I, the Druze leadership worried about faring poorly under French authority.

In the beginning years, the Druze under the leadership of the al-Atrash family were satisfied with the idea of autonomous rule, but disagreements with the authorities arose relating to the extent of Druze independence, the powers of the al-Atrash over Jabal al-Druze and the overriding power of the mandate authorities. Conflicts between the French authorities and the Druze of Hauran arose in July 1922 after the latter agreed to protect the Lebanese rebel Adham Khanjar who allegedly attempted to assassinate High Commissioner Henri Gouraud. When Khanjar was apprehended near Sultan Pasha al-Atrash's home in al-Qurayya, Druze fighters attacked the arresting authorities, killing a lieutenant. After the French appointed army officer Captain Carillet as governor of Jabal al-Druze in violation of the 1921 French-Druze Agreement which stipulated that a Druze be in charge, tensions between al-Atrash and the authorities increased, particularly after October 1924. General tensions relating to the success of French taxation and attempts to instill the values of French society through the building of secular schools, courts and roads led to resentment by the Druze inhabitants.

After the high commissioner, General Maurice Sarrail arrested and banished three Druze sheikhs to Palmyra on 11 July 1925, Sultan al-Atrash launched a rebellion which became known as the Great Syrian Revolt. After shooting down a French military aircraft, al-Atrash's forces destroyed a French Army reinforcement column, killing 111 soldiers out of 174, in the Battle of al-Kafr on 22 July.

== Battle ==
Following the French defeat at al-Kafr, General Michaud prepared a punitive expedition from his Damascus headquarters to move against the Druze. The total number of French troops has been estimated at 3,500. By 29 July, al-Atrash's rebels had destroyed railroad tracks at al-Mismiyya between Damascus and Daraa and parts of the paved road between Izra' and al-Suwayda, slowing the advance of Michaud's troops. In the town of Izra' the French garrison mobilized a force consisting of roughly 1,000 French soldiers plus 2,000 Syrian and French-African colonial troops. This force was made up of three and a half infantry battalions with three squadrons of cavalry on the flanks, backed by armored vehicles and artillery at the rear. On 31 July the French column began its march through the midsummer heat, first entering the town of Busra al-Harir which had been experiencing a drought.

The French reached the agricultural town of al-Mazraa at the base of Jabal al-Druze after a march of 25 kilometers on 2 August. The terrain consisted of largely flat open areas with little vegetation. Movement in al-Mazraa could be easily detected from the slopes of Jabal al-Druze and al-Atrash was able to plainly view the French force when they stopped in the town. Al-Atrash's cavalry, which consisted of roughly 500 Druze and Bedouin fighters, subsequently assaulted the French column, inflicting moderate casualties before being routed.

Afterward, in the early hours of 3 August, al-Atrash's men launched a second attack on a supporting ammunition convoy, forcing it to retreat to Izra'. Consequently, and because of the hot and dry weather conditions, General Michaud also decided to withdraw to Izra'. Seeing the French column in full retreat, al-Atrash's forces assaulted Michaud's troops, completely routing the French advance on al-Suwayda. The French force's second-in-command Major Jean Aujac and his 42nd Battalion of Malagasy tirailleurs (colonial infantry from French Madagascar) covered Michaud's withdrawal, resulting in this unit's destruction.

Survivors of the Malagasy rearguard fled while Major Aujac committed suicide on the battlefield by shooting himself. At the end of the battle, 1,029 French, Senegalese and Malagasy soldiers and their Syrian auxiliaries had been killed or wounded, while much of the remainder of the French-led force had been captured or deserted .

== Aftermath ==
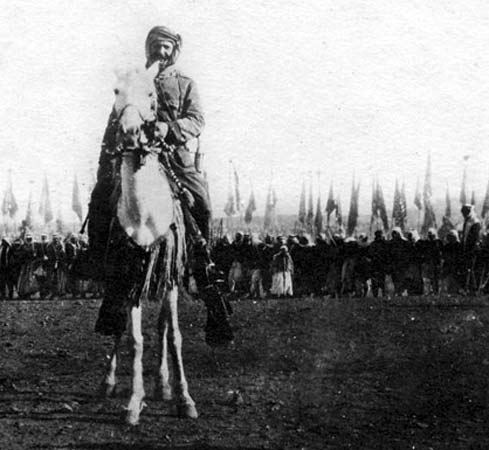
Sheikh Hilal al-Atrash, leading his armies against the French Mandate, 24 August 1925

The battle at al-Mazraa ended in a victory for Sultan al-Atrash, and his men were able to capture 2,000 rifles with ammunition and supplies, several machine guns and an artillery battery. Negotiations between the mandatory authorities, led by delegation head Captain Raynaud, and the Druze sheikhs, led by delegation head Hamad al-Atrash, began on 11 August. The French demanded the release of all military prisoners and the right to bury their dead left on the battlefields of both Kafr and Mazraa. The Druze demanded the release of ten of their own people captured from the citadel of al-Suwayda on 3 July and the Druze sheikhs who were imprisoned in Palmyra. On 14 August the prisoner exchange took place in the Hauran village of Umm Walad, the site of the negotiations. Over 2,000 Druze horsemen attended the exchange to celebrate the release of their comrades.

French authority over most of Jabal al-Druze was lost as a result of the battle, although a French garrison remained in control of al-Suwayda for over a month. Short of supplies, the French withdrew from al-Suwayda by 24 September, leaving much of the town destroyed. Following his defeat, which had caused great embarrassment to the Mandate government, General Michaud was recalled to France in disgrace. He was replaced by General Maurice Gamelin.

News of the victory of Sultan al-Atrash reached Damascus shortly after the battle's end, inspiring Syrian nationalists in the country's capital and the countryside to join the Druze in revolt. During the next few months, most of the regions under French rule in Syria rose in rebellion. Al-Atrash was regarded as a hero by the people of Jabal al-Druze and nationalists throughout the country. His forces were thereafter seen by the nationalist leadership of Damascus, particularly Abd al-Rahman Shahbandar, as the vanguard of the nationalist movement for an independent Arab Syria.

== Bibliography ==
- Betts, Robert Brenton (2010). The Druze. Yale University Press. ISBN 978-0300048100.
- Jacques, Tony (2007). Dictionary of Battles and Sieges: P-Z. Greenwood Publishing Group. ISBN 978-0313335396.
- Provence, Michael (2005). The Great Syrian Revolt and the Rise of Arab Nationalism. University of Texas Press. ISBN 9780292706804.
