= Al-Qurayya =

Town in Suwayda, Syria

al-Qurayya القريا al-Qrayya
- Town
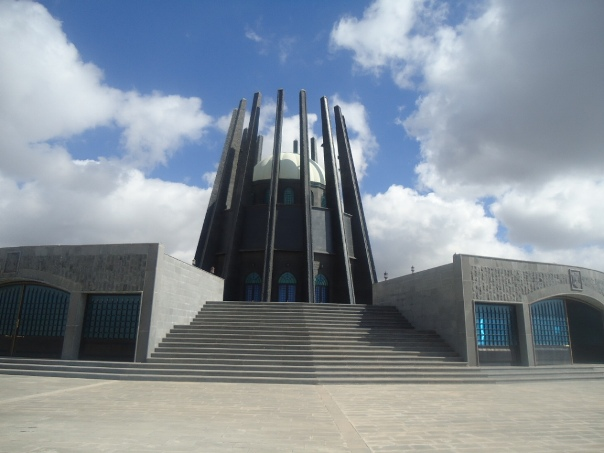
- Mausoleum of Sultan Pasha Al-Atrash

- Location within Syria
- Coordinates: 32°32′33″N 36°35′49″E
- PAL: 299/217
- Country: De facto: Supreme Legal Committee in Suwayda
- Governorate: Suwayda
- District: Salkhad
- Subdistrict: Qurayya

Population (2004 census)
  - Total: 6,789
- Time zone: UTC+2 (EET)
  - Summer (DST): UTC+3 (EEST)

Al-Qurayya (Arabic: القريا; also spelled al-Qrayya or Kureiyeh) is a town in southern Syria, administratively part of the Suwayda Governorate, located south of Suwayda. Nearby localities include Bosra to the southwest, Hout to the south, Salkhad to the southeast, al-Kafr, Hibran and Sahwet al-Khudr to the northeast, Sahwet Blatah and Rasas to the north and Ira and al-Mujaymer to the northwest. According to the Syria Central Bureau of Statistics (CBS), al-Qurayya had a population of 6,789 in the 2004 census. The town is also the administrative center of the al-Qurayya nahiyah which consists of four towns with a combined population of 9,892. In Al-Qurayya, Druze make up the predominant population, while Christians and Sunni Muslim Bedouins represent a minority.

== History ==
Western scholar Josias Leslie Porter identified al-Qurayya with biblical "Kerioth" mentioned by Jeremiah as one of the cities in the plain of Moab. The prophet Amos wrote that he would "devour the palaces of Kerioth." The city is later mentioned in the 4th-century CE as "Koreath," a village belonging to Bosra in the Roman province Arabia Petraea. However, this "Koreath" has also been identified with the nearby palace of Ein Qarata to the south of the Lejat plain. On streets and alleyways throughout the village were the remains of several columns. A Greek inscription was found on one of the stones and dated back to 296 CE.

=== Ottoman period ===
In 1596 al-Qurayya appeared in the Ottoman tax registers being part of the nahiya of Bani Nasiyya in the Qada of Hauran. It had an entirely Muslim population consisting of 65 households and 36 bachelors. Taxes were paid on wheat, barley, summer crops, fruit- or other trees.

In 1810 al-Qurayya contained a few Druze families and was the chief village in the areas south and southwest of Ira in Jabal al-Arab. Between the 1830s and 1840s, the prominent al-Atrash clan chose the village as their principal residence. It was granted to them by the initial Druze rulers of the village, the al-Hamdan clan. It was still subject to raids by Bedouin nomads at that time. In April 1838, while young Druze fighters from al-Qurayya were confronting the Egyptian army of Ibrahim Pasha, the village was looted and several of its inhabitants were killed in a raid by Sheikh Ibn Sumayr and his 'Anza Bedouin tribe. Further major raids against al-Qurayya occurred in 1842 and 1846.

In 1838 al-Qurayya was reported to be populated with Druze and Christians.

Only in the 1850s did relative stability take root. In 1852 al-Qurayya, then seat of Ismail al-Atrash, became the headquarters of Druze resistance against an Ottoman conscription decree. According to Porter, who visited al-Qurayya in 1853, the village had shrunk from one of the major towns of the Hauran plain to a small village. Many of its houses were built from ancient materials. Its chief in the 1850s was Sami Faruq Pasha al-Atrash, the most powerful Druze sheikh in the Hauran. In 1856-57 al-Qurayya served as the base for the Druze in their offensive against the Muslim villages of the Hauran.

=== French Mandate period ===
The French Mandate authorities bombed al-Qurayya and destroyed the home of its sheikh Sultan Pasha al-Atrash in a clash in 1921. During the Great Syrian Revolt of 1925-27, which was spearheaded by Sultan Pasha, al-Qurayya served as the chief meeting place for the sheikhs of local rebel clans.

== Demographics ==
In 2011, the Melkite Greek Catholic Church had approximately 1,500 believers.

== Religious buildings ==
- St. Ayyub (St. Job) Greek Orthodox Church
- St. Mikhael (St. Michael) Melkite Greek Catholic Church
- Maqam Balkhi (Druze Shrine)

== Notable people ==
- Sultan al-Atrash
- Mansur al-Atrash
- Farid al-Atrash

== See also ==
- Druze in Syria
- Christianity in Syria

== Bibliography ==
- Batatu, H. (2012). Syria's Peasantry, the Descendants of Its Lesser Rural Notables, and Their Politics. Princeton University Press. ISBN 978-0691002545.
- Firro, Kais (1992). A History of the Druzes. Vol. 1. BRILL. ISBN 9004094377.
- Hütteroth, W.-D.; Abdulfattah, K. (1977). Historical Geography of Palestine, Transjordan and Southern Syria in the Late 16th Century. Erlanger Geographische Arbeiten, Sonderband 5. Erlangen, Germany: Vorstand der Fränkischen Geographischen Gesellschaft. ISBN 3-920405-41-2.
- Porter, J.L. (1858). A Handbook for Travellers in Syria and Palestine. Vol. 1. Murray.
- Shahid, I. (2002). Toponymy, Monuments, Historical Geography and Frontier Studies. Vol. 21. Dumbarton Oaks. ISBN 0884022846.
