= Al-Mazraa, Suwayda =

Al-Mazraa المزرعة As-Sijen
- Town
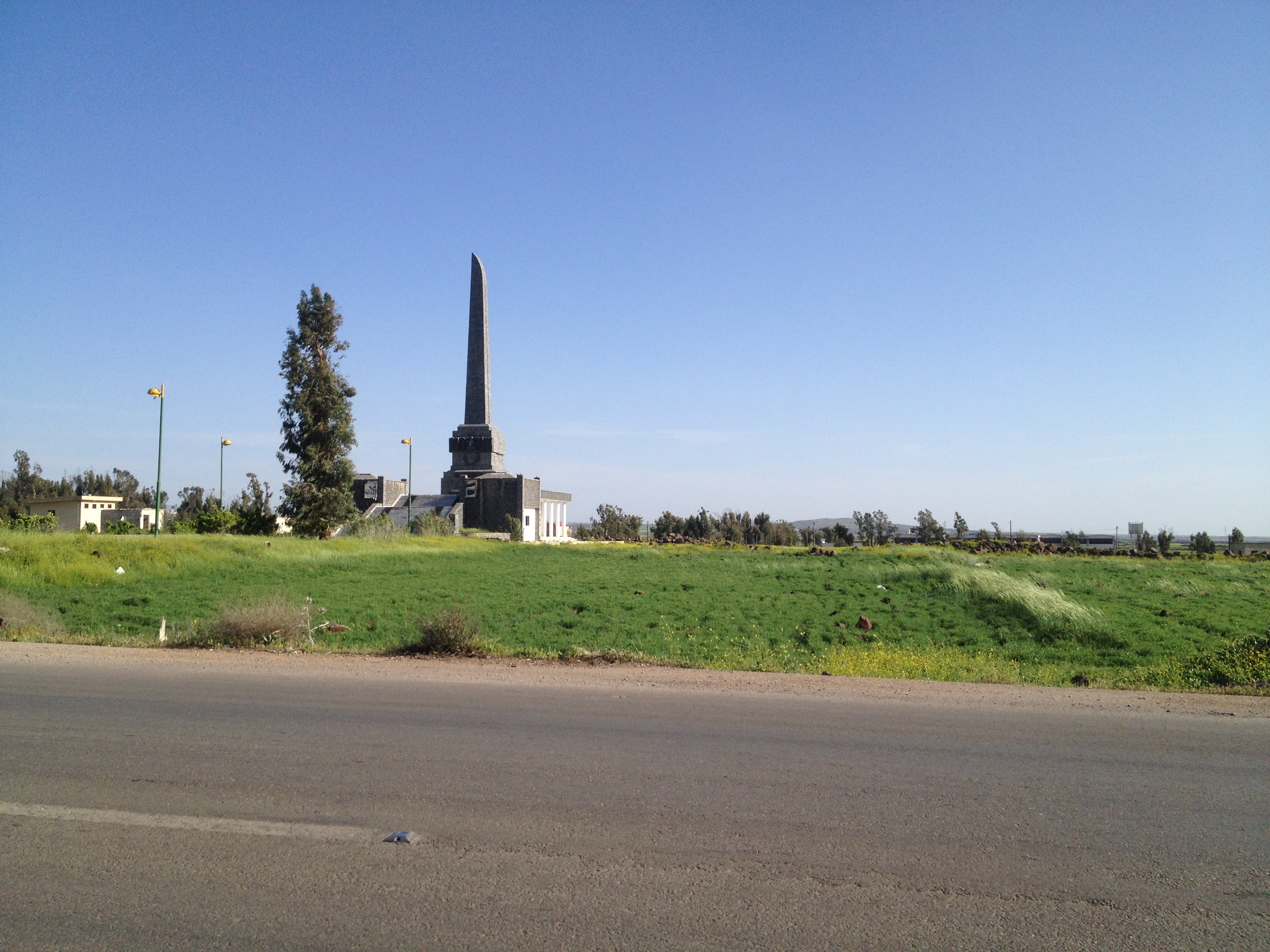
- Monument to the Martyrs of the Battle of al-Mazraa

- Location within Syria
- Coordinates: 32°46′58″N 36°29′0″E
- Grid position: 288/243
- Country: Syria
- Governorate: Suwayda
- District: Suwayda
- Subdistrict: Mazraa

Population (2004)
  - Total: 2,454
- Time zone: UTC+2 (EET)
  - Summer (DST): UTC+3 (EEST)

Al-Mazraa (Arabic: المزرعة, alternatively spelled al-Mazra'a or al-Mazra'ah), formerly known as as-Sijen (Arabic: السجن alternatively spelled Es-Sijine, Sijne or Sijni) is a village in southeastern Syria, administratively part of the Suwayda Governorate, located 12 kilometers (7 miles) northwest of Suwayda. Nearby localities include al-Hirak, Khirbet Ghazaleh and Da'el to the west and Umm Walad and Bosra to the south. According to the Syria Central Bureau of Statistics (CBS), al-Mazraa had a population of 2,454 in the 2004 census. The town is also the administrative center of the al-Mazraa nahiyah of the Suwayda District which consists of 12 villages with a combined population of 16,627.

The town played a significant role in the Great Syrian Revolt of 1925–1927 that was led by Druze leader Sultan al-Atrash.

In Al-Mazraa, Druze make up the predominant population, while Christians and Sunni Muslim Bedouins represent a minority.

== Etymology ==
In the past, the town was called as-Sijen based on two stories: the first claims there was an ancient spring that dried up, and people said it had been “imprisoned” (which is the meaning of sijn in Arabic); the second suggests the existence of an old prison in the area. Later, the name changed to al-Mazraa (“The Farm”) due to the nearby Ain al-Mazraa (Mazraa Spring), known for its fresh water and the surrounding greenery that always crowns it.

== History ==
A stone with an inscription dating from 179/80 CE. has been found in the town. Although the inscription dates from the Roman era in Syria, there is no other indication that the immediate region surrounding as-Sijn was part of the Roman province of Arabia Petraea at the time, and historian Glen Bowersock suggests the inscription was on "a wandering stone which had made its way to Sijn from some other place that was actually within the province of Arabia".

In 1596 the village appeared under the name of "Sijni" in the Ottoman tax registers as part of the nahiya (subdistrict) of Bani Nasiyya in the qadaa of Hauran. It had an all Muslim population, consisting of thirty-nine households and eleven bachelors. They paid a fixed tax-rate of 20% on agricultural products, including wheat, barley, summer crops, goats and beehives, in addition to occasional revenues; the taxes totalled 5,500 akçe.

In the mid-19th-century, al-Mazraa was described by Irish missionary Josias Leslie Porter as a "small ruined village ... beside which there is a large fountain." It was inhabited by Ghawr Arabs who encamped at the site. Porter described as-Sijn as "a small Druze village situated on a low hill, contains some old houses of great solidity."

In 1838, as-Sijn was noted by American scholars and missionaries Eli Smith and Edward Robinson as a mixed Muslim and Melkite (Greek Catholic) village while al-Mazraa was a khirba (ruined, uninhabited village). At some point in the middle to late 19th century, Druze peasants from Jabal Hauran captured as-Sijn and other Muslim-majority villages in the Hauran plain and drove out their inhabitants. During the Druze revolt against the Ottoman Empire to protest conscription into the Ottoman army, Ottoman general Mustafa Pasha led his army to as-Sijn where he faced the forces of Ismail al-Atrash, the Druze chieftain. Although al-Atrash's men inflicted heavy casualties on Mustafa Pasha's army, the Ottomans eventually captured the town after receiving reinforcements. Consequently, in October 1862 al-Atrash negotiated an agreement with the Ottoman authorities, whereby al-Atrash would collect taxes from the Druze and Bedouins of the Hauran on behalf of the Ottoman authorities in return for Druze exemption from conscription.

In 1879, armed confrontations between the Muslims of Busra al-Harir and the Druze of Jabal Hauran was used an opportunity by the Muslims of the Hauran plain to press the Ottoman authorities to force the Druze withdrawal from sixteen formerly Muslim villages in the Hauran plain occupied by the Druze. The authorities accepted the request and consequently, a peace arrangement was made between the local Muslims and Druze, whereby the Druze would withdraw from the occupied Muslim villages. However, the Druze ultimately did not withdraw from ten of the plain villages, among which was as-Sijn. By 1888, a large Ottoman garrison was established in al-Mazraa in a bid to keep the frequently rebelling Druze clans in check and force their total submission to the government.

=== Modern era ===
As-Sijn was destroyed by Ottoman forces under the command of Sami Faruqi Pasha during the 1910 Druze revolt. The Ottomans were driven out of Syria by Arab and British forces in 1918, during World War I. Sometime after its destruction in 1910, the village was restored and in 1919 it had an estimated population of 800 Druze, 100 Christians and 20 Muslims.

Al-Mazraa near as-Sijn was the site of the Battle of al-Mazraa during the Great Syrian Revolt against the French occupation. The French forces, under the leadership of General Roger Michaud, consisted of five battalions of infantry, three squadrons of cavalry, in addition to armored cars and artillery. They were attacked, on 2 August 1925, by 500 Druze and Bedouin horsemen, led by Sultan Pasha al-Atrash. The rebel assault forced the French Army into full retreat and the battle turned into a rout. The victory at al-Mazraa was a turning point in the course of the rebellion, inspiring Syrian nationalists in the country's capital and the countryside to join the Druze in their revolt. Syria became independent in 1946. During the 1950s, the Ba'ath Party emerged as an influential force in Syrian politics, and one of the members of its Military Committee, Lieutenant Colonel Mazydad al-Hunaydi, was born in as-Sijn. As-Sijn was eventually renamed "al-Mazraa" in honor of the 1925 battle.

=== Civil war ===
Al-Mazraa saw heavy sectarian clashes in July 2025 between Druze militias and Bedouin tribes, leading the Syrian Armed Forces under President Ahmed al-Sharaa's transitional government to intervene and seize the town.

== Demographics ==
In 2011, the Melkite Greek Catholic Church had approximately 150 believers.

== Religious buildings ==
- Our Lady of the Annunciation Melkite Greek Catholic Church

== See also ==
- Druze in Syria
- Christians in Syria
- Battle of al-Mazraa

== Bibliography ==
- Batatu, H. (1999). Syria's peasantry, the descendants of its lesser rural notables, and their politics (Illustrated ed.). Princeton University Press. ISBN 0691002541.
- Bowersock, G. (1994). Roman Arabia. Harvard University Press. ISBN 9780674777569.
- Firro, Kais (1992). A History of the Druzes. Vol. 1. BRILL. ISBN 9004094377.
- Hütteroth, W.-D.; Abdulfattah, K. (1977). Historical Geography of Palestine, Transjordan and Southern Syria in the Late 16th Century. Erlanger Geographische Arbeiten, Sonderband 5. Erlangen, Germany: Vorstand der Fränkischen Geographischen Gesellschaft. ISBN 3-920405-41-2.
- Porter, J.L. (1855). Five years in Damascus: including an account of the history, topography, and antiquities of that city : with travels and researches in Palmyra, Lebanon, and the Hauran. Vol. 2. John Murray.
- Porter, J.L. (1868). A handbook for travellers in Syria and Palestine. Vol. II. J. Murray. p. 504.
- Provence, Michael (2005). The Great Syrian Revolt and the Rise of Arab Nationalism. University of Texas Press. ISBN 9780292706804.
- Robinson, E.; Smith, E. (1841). Biblical Researches in Palestine, Mount Sinai and Arabia Petraea: A Journal of Travels in the year 1838. Vol. 3. Boston: Crocker & Brewster.
- Socin, A. (1912). Palestine and Syria, with routes through Mesopotamia and Babylonia and the island of Cyprus. Karl Baedeker.
- Weismann, I. (2005). Ottoman Reform and Muslim Regeneration. I.B.Tauris. ISBN 1850437572.
