= Urman, Suwayda =

Village in Syria

Urman عرمان Orman, Arman
- Village
- Location in Syria
- Coordinates: 32°30′40″N 36°45′42″E
- Grid position: 315/213
- Country: Syria
- Governorate: Suwayda
- District: Salkhad
- Subdistrict: Salkhad

Population (2004)
  - Total: 5,735

Urman (Arabic: عرمان; also spelled Orman or Arman) is a village in southern Syria, administratively part of the Salkhad District of the Suwayda Governorate. It is located south of Suwayda and nearby localities include Salkhad to the west, Awas to the south, Malah to the east and Sahwet al-Khudr to the north. In the 2004 census it had a population of 5,735. Its inhabitants are predominantly Druze, with a Christian minority.

== History ==
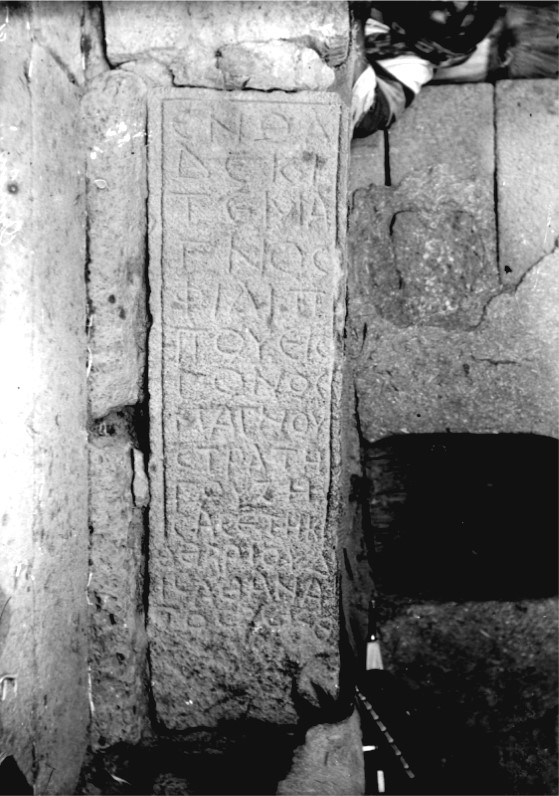
A Greek inscription found in Urman

Byzantine-era ruins and artifacts have been found in Urman. However, unlike other towns in the vicinity, Urman's inhabitants did not convert to Christianity by the 4th century, as indicated by an absence of Christian symbols and edifices. Paganism was practiced in the village until at least 517, as evidenced by stone inscriptions from Urman. There were Arab tribesmen in the village, but it is not clear if they formed all or part of the population.

=== Ottoman era ===
In 1596, Urman appeared in the Ottoman tax registers as part of the nahiya (subdistrict) of Bani Malik as-Sadir, in the Hauran Sanjak. It had an entirely Muslim population consisting of 17 households and 7 bachelors. They paid a fixed tax-rate of 40% on agricultural products, including wheat, barley, summer crops, goats, beehives and a water-mill; the taxes totaled 16,500 akçe.

Swiss traveler Johann Ludwig Burckhardt visited Orman in 1810 and noted that it was a deserted site, in 1838 Eli Smith noted the same. Smith also noted that it was located east of Salkhad. However, by the 1870s, the village was a large village settled by the Druze, who had migrated from Mount Lebanon. Urman was a village dominated by the Bani al-Atrash clan and in the 1870s, its sheikhs (chieftains) were Najm al-Atrash and his son Ibrahim. In the 1880s, migrants from the village of Jarmaq in the Galilee settled in Urman. They came to be known as the "al-Jarmaqani" family after their ancestral village. In 1889–1890, Urman was one of the four villages in the southern Jabal al-Arab mountainous region whose peasants rebelled against the al-Atrash sheikhs during the Ammiyya revolt. The village's rebel leader was Ibrahim al-Jarmaqani. The village was restored to al-Atrash control, but many of its peasant inhabitants came to become landowners independent from the al-Atrash sheikhs.

In June 1896, a revolt in the Jabal broke out following a clash between Druze residents of Urman and local Bedouin tribesmen. When the Ottomans dispatched fifty gendarmes to arrest the sheikhs of Urman, the latter's defenders destroyed the Ottoman unit. One hundred fifty more Ottoman troops were sent to subdue Urman, but before they could reach the village, they were slain by Druze rebels commanded by a niece of Sheikh Shibli al-Atrash. A subsequent punitive campaign by the Ottoman authorities inflicted heavy losses on the Druze inhabitants and rebels, who largely fled their villages to the Lejah, a deserted volcanic plain bordering the Jabal. The revolt came to an end by early 1897.

=== Modern era ===
Syria came under French rule in 1920 and in the summer of 1925, the Druze of Jabal al-Arab initiated the Great Syrian Revolt (1925–1927) against the French. The revolt's first shots occurred at Urman when Sultan Pasha al-Atrash and 250 of his horsemen entered the village and were tracked there by two French reconnaissance planes; al-Atrash's fighters fired at the circling planes, shooting one down. The day after, al-Atrash's troops captured Salkhad, marking the revolt's commencement.

Between the turn of the 20th century and the 1930s, some of the inhabitants of Urman emigrated from the village to countries such as the United States, Argentina, Venezuela, Senegal and Nigeria. Another wave of emigration from Urman and nearby Druze villages primarily to Venezuela occurred between 1954 and 1958. In the 1980s, a wave of emigrants from Urman returned to the village. Many of these former emigrants built their residences along the roads leading into Urman, rather than relocate in the old village center.

== Religious buildings ==
- St. George Greek Orthodox Church

== See also ==
- Druze in Syria
- Christians in Syria

== Bibliography ==
- Escher, Anton (1995). "Migrant Network – An Answer to Contain Desertification: A Case Study of Southern Syria (Gabal al-Arab)". In Tomás, Juan Puigdefábregas; Mendizábal, Teresa (eds.). Desertification and Migrations (PDF). Geoforma Ediciones.
- Hütteroth, W.-D.; Abdulfattah, K. (1977). Historical Geography of Palestine, Transjordan and Southern Syria in the Late 16th Century. Erlanger Geographische Arbeiten, Sonderband 5. Erlangen, Germany: Vorstand der Fränkischen Geographischen Gesellschaft. ISBN 3-920405-41-2.
- Robinson, E.; Smith, E. (1841). Biblical Researches in Palestine, Mount Sinai and Arabia Petraea: A Journal of Travels in the year 1838. Vol. 3. Boston: Crocker & Brewster.
- Trombley, Frank R. (1995). Hellenic Religion and Christianization: C. 370–529. Brill.
- Wright, W. (1895). An Account of Palmyra and Zenobia: with Travels and Adventures in Bashan and the Desert. T. Nelson and Sons.
