= Sahwet al-Khudr =

Sahwet al-Khudr سهوة الخضر Sahwet al-Khidr, Sahwet al-Khider,
- Village
- Location within Syria
- Coordinates: 32°36′8″N 36°42′27″E
- Grid position: 310/224
- Country: Syria
- Governorate: Suwayda
- District: Suwayda
- Subdistrict: Suwayda

Population (2004 census)
  - Total: 3,625
- Time zone: UTC+2 (EET)
  - Summer (DST): UTC+3 (EEST)

Sahwet al-Khudr (Arabic: سهوة الخضر, also spelled Sahwet al-Khidr or Sahwet el-Khodar) is a village in southern Syria, administratively part of the Suwayda District of the Suwayda Governorate, located south of Suwayda. According to the 2004 census, it had a population of 3,625. The village is named after a Byzantine-era church named dedicated to Saint George (known by local Druze as "al-Khudr"). It was resettled by Druze in the mid-19th century after a period of abandonment. Its inhabitants are predominantly Druze.

== History ==
This village is probably the center of Biblical "Kedar," a regional nation of nomadic shepherd-people who inhabited the general area. The 19th century German visionary Bl. Anne Catherine Emmerich mentions "Cedar" as also being a city, presumably this city (as verified by her detailed descriptions), to which Jesus visited, so she says, on an historically unrecorded journey.

Sahwet al-Khudr receives its name from an ancient Byzantine church dedicated to Saint George, who is identified with "al-Khudr" by Muslims. An inscription on a monument in the church dates back to 306 CE.

=== Ottoman era ===
In 1596 it appeared in the Ottoman tax registers under the name of Sahut al-Qamh, located in the Nahiya of Bani Nasiyya of the Qada of Hawran. The population was 142 households and 54 bachelors, all Muslim. They paid a fixed tax-rate of 40 % on agricultural products, including wheat, barley, summer crops, vineyards, goats and beehives; in addition to occasional revenues and a water mill; a total of 31,300 akçe.

In 1838 Eli Smith noted that the place was located South of Juneineh and that it was in ruins. Sahwet al-Khudr had been abandoned for a time, but was settled by Druze between 1857 and 1860 at the encouragement of Ismail al-Atrash, a prominent Druze sheikh (chieftain) in the Hauran. In the mid-19th-century, Albert Socin, a European orientalist noted that Sahwat al-Khudr was "a dilapidated town with a castle and a church" surrounded by a forested area. The shrine of al-Khudr in the village was revered by all the religious sects of the vicinity.

=== Modern era ===
In the late 1960s, French geographer Robert Boulanger described Sahwet al-Khudr as "a very picturesque place" with an old mosque that was formerly a pagan temple in Antiquity. The mosque's prayer room contained a column with Nabataean inscriptions. The people of the village slaughtered sheep outside of the mosque annually.

== Geography ==
Nearby localities include Salah to the northeast, Mayamas to the north, Hibran to the northwest, Salkhad to the southwest and Urman to the south.

== Religious buildings ==
- Maqam al-Khidr (Druze Shrine)

== See also ==
- Druze in Syria

== Bibliography ==
- Boulanger, Robert (1966). The Middle East, Lebanon, Syria, Jordan, Iraq, Iran.
- Firro, Kais (1992). A History of the Druzes. Vol. 1. BRILL. ISBN 9004094377.
- Hütteroth, W.-D.; Abdulfattah, K. (1977). Historical Geography of Palestine, Transjordan and Southern Syria in the Late 16th Century. Erlanger Geographische Arbeiten, Sonderband 5. Erlangen, Germany: Vorstand der Fränkischen Geographischen Gesellschaft. ISBN 3-920405-41-2.
- Porter, J.L. (1868). A Handbook for Travellers in Syria and Palestine. Vol. 2. Murray.
- Robinson, E.; Smith, E. (1841). Biblical Researches in Palestine, Mount Sinai and Arabia Petraea: A Journal of Travels in the year 1838. Vol. 3. Boston: Crocker & Brewster.
- Socin, A. (1876). Baedeker, K. (ed.). Palestine and Syria: Handbook for Travellers. Karl Baedeker. p. 412.
