= Al-Rashideh =

Al-Rashideh الرشيدة
- Village
- Location within Syria
- Coordinates: 32°40′05″N 36°50′37″E
- Country: Syria
- Governorate: Suwayda
- District: Suwayda
- Subdistrict: Mushannaf

Population (2004 census)
  - Total: 796
- Time zone: UTC+2 (EET)
  - Summer (DST): UTC+3 (EEST)

Al-Rashideh (Arabic: الرشيدة) is a village situated in the Suwayda District of Suwayda Governorate, in southern Syria. According to the Syria Central Bureau of Statistics (CBS), Al-Rashideh had a population of 796 in the 2004 census. Its inhabitants are predominantly Druze.

== Religious buildings ==
- Maqam Mrs. Sarah (Al-Dalafa) (Druze Shrine)

== See also ==
- Druze in Syria
