= Al Hamdan =

Druze clan in southeastern Syria

Al Hamdan (Arabic: آل حمدان, romanized: Āl Ḥamdān) is a Druze clan based in Jabal al-Druze, a mountainous region in southeastern Syria. They were among the earliest Druze settlers in Jabal Hawran and were the dominant local force in that region between their establishment there in 1711 and circa 1860, when the al-Atrash clan became the prominent Druze power.

== History ==
=== Rule in Jabal Hawran ===
The Al Hamdan claim descent from the Hamdanids (Banu Hamdan), an Arab dynasty that governed much of northern Syria during Fatimid rule in the 10th century. This claim is accepted by 20th-century French historian N. Bouron and Druze historian A. Najjar. However, Druzite historian Kais Firro views the claim of Hamdanid descent as skeptical and believes the Al Hamdan invented and spread it to boost their legitimacy as leaders of the Druze community, which generally held great respect for noble genealogy. According to Al Hamdan tradition, members of the family adopted the Druze faith during the Fatimid era, and migrated to Mount Lebanon during the Fatimid decline in Syria. However, early Druze chronicles do not mention conversion to the Druze religion among any members of the Hamdanid dynasty. In Mount Lebanon, the Al Hamdan were based in the village of Kafra.

Following the 1711 Battle of Ain Dara between the rival Qaysi and Yamani factions of the Druze, in which the Yamani were routed, the latter faction began a mass exodus to the Hawran from Mount Lebanon. The Al Hamdan were part of this migration. At the time of the migration, a small Druze community was present in Hawran and led by the Alam al-Dins, a Yamani princely family from Mount Lebanon. When the Alam al-Dins returned to Mount Lebanon to fight alongside his Yamani kinsmen in 1711, leadership of the Hawran Druze passed to the Al Hamdan. The clan was headquartered in the village of Najran, situated at the western edge of the Lejah plain, and also controlled five villages in the vicinity. The Al Hamdan's ancestral village of Kafra was destroyed in a snowstorm in the early 18th century, prompting its inhabitants to join the Al Hamdan in Hawran. The Al Hamdan continued to have branches in the Gharb district of Mount Lebanon and in the Galilee. Khalil al-Hamdan, a member of the family from the Galilee moved to Hawran and strengthened the rule of his kinsman Hamdan al-Hamdan.

During the 1837–1838 Druze revolt against Ibrahim Pasha of Egypt, the governor of Syria, the Druze were led by Yahya al-Hamdan, who was the leading chieftain of Jabal Hawran. Between 1852 and 1857, Isma'il al-Atrash, a Druze chieftain based in al-Qurayya, became the virtual military chief of the Jabal Hawran Druze at the expense of Al Hamdan's authority. Ismail's rise and rivalry with the Al Hamdan divided the Druze into two factions, with most of the long-established Druze families backing the Al Hamdan and the newer migrants supporting Bani al-Atrash. The preeminent sheikh of the Al Hamdan at the time was Wakid al-Hamdan. In 1856, the sheikhs of the Bani Amer, Abu Fakhr, Abu Assaf, Al Hanaydi and Al Azzam clans petitioned the Ottoman governor of Damascus to appoint Wakil as "first sheikh" of Jabal Hawran in their bid to stem al-Atrash power. The following year, Isma'il al-Atrash captured the Al Hamdan's secondary village, Ira, and drove out its sheikh Hazza al-Hamdan, Wakid's brother.

=== Decline ===
By 1860, the Al Hamdan lost their position of power in Jabal Hawran and became largely dependent on the more powerful Bani Amer. By 1862, the Al Hamdan had lost Qanawat, which no longer came under any one particular family's rule, but rather served as the headquarters of the Druze shaykh al-aql (religious leader), Sheikh Husayn al-Hajari. To make up for losing Qanawat, the Al Hamdan captured the villages of Aslihah in the Hawran plain and Masad south of Sweida. The Al Hamdan controlled five villages in Jabal Hawran in 1868. The clan sided with the Bedouin Sulut tribe in their war against Isma'il al-Atrash that year.

== Bibliography ==
- Baer, Gabriel (1982). Fellah and Townsman in the Middle East: Studies in Social History. Frank Cass and Company Limited. ISBN 9780714631264.
- Firro, Kais (1992). A History of the Druzes. Vol. 1. BRILL. ISBN 9004094377.
- Sa'b, Mahmud Khalil (2004). Stories and Scenes from Mount Lebanon. Saqi Books. p. 320. ISBN 9780863565700.
