= Al-Tayyibah, Suwayda =

Al-Tayyibah الطيبة At-Taibah
- Village
- Location within Syria
- Coordinates: 32°46′02″N 36°43′25″E
- Country: Syria
- Governorate: Suwayda
- District: Suwayda
- Subdistrict: Mushannaf

Population (2004 census)
  - Total: 1,645
- Time zone: UTC+2 (EET)
  - Summer (DST): UTC+3 (EEST)

Al-Tayyibah (Arabic: الطيبة) is a village situated in the Suwayda District of Suwayda Governorate, in southern Syria. According to the Syria Central Bureau of Statistics (CBS), Al-Tayyibah had a population of 1,645 in the 2004 census. Its inhabitants are predominantly Druze.

== See also ==
- Druze in Syria
