= Hauran Druze Rebellion =

Druze uprising against Ottoman authority in the Syrian province

Hauran Druze rebellion
- Map of the Hauran region
| Date | May 1909 – 8 November 1910 |
| Location | Jabal ad-Duruz |
| Result | Rebellion crushed |

Belligerents
| Ottoman Empire | Druze rebels Allied Bedouins |

Commanders and leaders
| Sami Pasha al-Farouqi | Zuqan al-Atrash (executed) |

Strength
| 21,000 | 8,000 (Druze); 3,000 (Allied Bedouins) |

Casualties and losses
| 38 to 100 | 2,000 killed and 2,000 wounded Hundreds imprisoned |

The Hauran Druze Rebellion was a violent Druze uprising against Ottoman authority in the Syrian province, which erupted in 1909. The rebellion was led by the al-Atrash family in an aim to retain regional autonomy, but ended in the suppression of the Druze forces, significant depopulation of the Hauran region, and the execution of key Druze leaders in 1911.

== Background ==
The Hauran is a volcanic plateau, located in southwestern Syria and extending into the northwestern corner of modern-day Jordan. The area includes the Golan Heights on the west, and is bounded there by the Jordan Rift Valley; it also includes the Jabal ad-Duruz area in the east, and is bounded there by more arid steppe and desert terrains.

With the advent of the Ottoman Empire and the conquest of Syria by Sultan Selim I in 1516, the Druze Ma'ans were acknowledged by the new rulers as the feudal lords of southern Mount Lebanon. Druze villages spread and prospered in that region, which under Ma'an leadership so flourished that it acquired the generic term of Jabal Bayt-Ma'an (the mountain of the Ma'an family) or Jabal al-Druze. The latter title has since been used for the Hauran region, which since the middle of the 19th century has proven a haven of refuge to Druze emigrants from Mount Lebanon, and has become the headquarters of Druze power. The Druze family of Al-Atrash had nominally governed the region of Suwayda since 1879. Following the Young Turk Revolution of 1908, the spread of centralized taxation, census registrations, and conscription—to areas already undergoing economic change caused by the construction of new railroads—provoked large revolts, particularly among the Druze of the Hauran.

== Rebellion ==
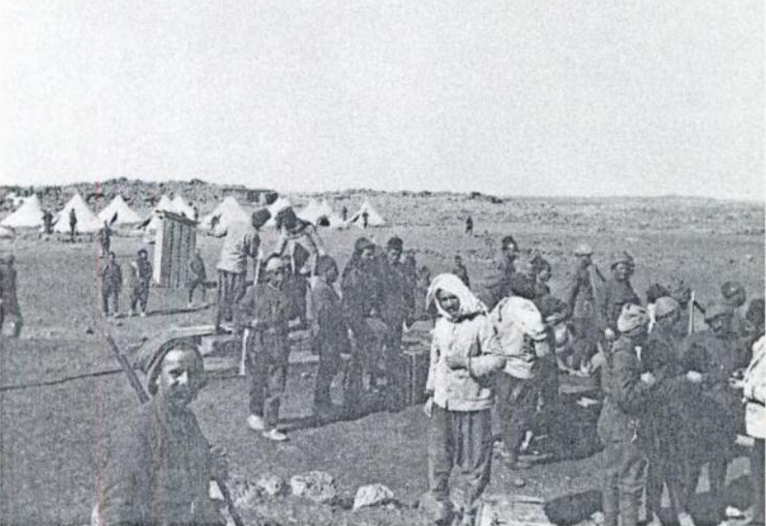
Sami Pasha al-Farouqi's troops used in the Druze rebellion near Daraa railway station.

The rebellion in Hauran erupted in May 1909, when a business dispute involving Druze chief Yahia bey Atrash in the village of Busra al-Harir escalated into a clash of arms between the Druze and Ottoman-backed local villagers. A year of truce attempts followed, but failed to achieve stability in the area, prompting an Ottoman military response.

Sami Pasha al-Farouqi arrived in Damascus in August 1910, leading an Ottoman expeditionary force of some 35 battalions, and began advancing on Druze positions on 18 or 19 September. The first major battle took place on 1–2 October, where the Druze were compelled to retreat. A second battle was fought on 12 October, where the government secured another victory. By 8 November, the organized rebellion had disintegrated.

Though the Druze recognized they were outnumbered and outgunned, several fierce defensive clashes followed. Zuqan al-Atrash led a determined resistance against the Ottomans near al-Kafr, where he faced the main column of Sami Pasha al-Farouqi's forces. After engaging Ottoman troops in consecutive villages, the defensive line collapsed.

Sami Pasha used tactical force and local diplomatic maneuvers to occupy the entirety of Jabal el-Druze. The rebellion concluded with massive casualties among the Druze inhabitants of the Hauran, reaching roughly 10% of the population. The number of killed is put at 2,000, with a similar number wounded and hundreds imprisoned in Damascus and Acre. This led to significant depopulation of entire areas within the region. Zuqan, the primary leader of the revolt, was captured and subsequently executed in Damascus in March 1911.

== Aftermath ==
Following the collapse of the Druze revolt, al-Farouqi launched a comprehensive campaign to disarm the population, collecting roughly 10,000 rifles. Al-Farouqi also enacted a strict census of the Hauran area, ordering 200,000 registration cards from Istanbul for the purpose. Arrears in taxes were forcefully collected using livestock allocations where currency was unavailable. Furthermore, one thousand young Druze men were conscripted into the Ottoman army and scattered across distant operational fronts of the empire. The Druze campaign of 1910 served as an operational starting point for Istanbul to cancel its long-standing "policy of exceptions" in Ottoman Syria, implementing similar centralization measures during the Karak revolt in Transjordan.

During the First World War, the Ottomans left Jabal al-Druze in relative peace to avoid triggering another costly regional insurgency. Sultan al-Atrash, son of the executed Zuqan al-Atrash, utilized this period to open communication channels with Pan-Arab nationalist movements, aligning closely with the Arab Revolt in the Hejaz. When Arab Hashemite forces reached Aqaba, he dispatched a thousand men to join the advance. He later joined them personally with an additional 300 cavalrymen when they reached Bosra.

Sultan al-Atrash maintained close relations with Emir Faisal, leader of the Northern Arab Army. Following the campaign, Sultan was awarded the title of Emir and the rank of a General in the Syrian army, the structural equivalent of an Ottoman Pasha.

In 1920, the al-Atrash clan supported the short-lived Arab Kingdom of Syria, which was subsequently occupied by France after the Battle of Maysalun on July 24, 1920. Sultan al-Atrash prepared his forces to counter the French entry, but the rapid collapse of the Damascus government cut his efforts short. The territory was subsequently partitioned into French mandate zones, with the Jabal Druze State (initially established as the State of Souaida) designated as an autonomous zone. Sultan al-Atrash would later serve as the supreme revolutionary commander of the Great Syrian Revolt against the French Mandate between 1925 and 1927, remaining a central legacy figure in modern Syrian history.

== See also ==
- 1860 Druze–Maronite conflict
- Adana massacre
- Franco-Syrian War
