= Jarmaq, Palestine =

Village in the northern Galilee, near Safed

Jarmaq (Arabic: الجرمق, romanized: al-Jarmaq), also Khirbet Rom (خربة روم, Khirbat Rūm), was a village in the northern Galilee, near Safed, situated at the lower, western ridge of Mount Meron (Jabal al-Jarmaq), overlooking the Sea of Galilee. It was inhabited by Druze before it was abandoned in the 1880s.

== History ==
Ceramic shards from the Byzantine and the early Arabic era have been found in Jarmaq. SWP found "traces of ruins around this village".

=== Ottoman era ===
In the 1596 tax records, it was named as a village, Jarmaq, in the Ottoman nahiya (subdistrict) of Jira, part of Safad Sanjak, with a population of 79 households and 12 bachelors, all Muslims. The villagers paid taxes on goats (500 a.), "occasional revenues" (550 a.), in addition to a fixed sum of 8,000; a total of 9,050 akçe.

Jarmaq was a Druze village, which began to decline in the 1830s, with Edward Robinson calling it "almost deserted". In 1877 , "El Jermuk" was described as "A small half-ruined village, built of stone, containing about thirty Druzes. Water supply from a good well and springs near. The inhabitants emigrated to the Hauran in the following decade. Jarmaq is the ancestral village of the eponymous Jarmaqani family resident in modern Salkhad, al-Qurayya and Urman. By the time of the 1948 Palestinian expulsion and flight, the village was already no longer inhabited.

== Bibliography ==
- Bonar, A.A.; M'Cheyne, R.M. (1843). Narrative of a mission of inquiry to the Jews from the Church of Scotland in 1839. Philadelphia : Presbyterian board of publications.
- Conder, C.R.; Kitchener, H.H. (1881). The Survey of Western Palestine: Memoirs of the Topography, Orography, Hydrography, and Archaeology. Vol. 1. London: Committee of the Palestine Exploration Fund.
- Dauphin, C. (1998). La Palestine byzantine, Peuplement et Populations. BAR International Series 726 (in French). Vol. III : Catalogue. Oxford: Archeopress. ISBN 0-86054-905-4.
- Firro, Kais (1992). A History of the Druzes. Vol. 1. BRILL. ISBN 9004094377.
- Hütteroth, W.-D.; Abdulfattah, K. (1977). Historical Geography of Palestine, Transjordan and Southern Syria in the Late 16th Century. Erlanger Geographische Arbeiten, Sonderband 5. Erlangen, Germany: Vorstand der Fränkischen Geographischen Gesellschaft. ISBN 3-920405-41-2.
- Meyers, E.M.; Strange, James F.; Groh, Dennis E. (1978). "The Meiron Excavation Project: Archeological Survey in Galilee and Golan, 1976". Bulletin of the American Schools of Oriental Research. 230 (230): 1–24. doi:10.2307/1356609. JSTOR 1356609.
- Palmer, E.H. (1881). The Survey of Western Palestine: Arabic and English Name Lists Collected During the Survey by Lieutenants Conder and Kitchener, R. E. Transliterated and Explained by E.H. Palmer. Committee of the Palestine Exploration Fund.
- Robinson, E.; Smith, E. (1856). Later Biblical Researches in Palestine and adjacent regions: A Journal of Travels in the year 1852. London: John Murray.
- Rhode, H. (1979). Administration and Population of the Sancak of Safed in the Sixteenth Century (PhD). Columbia University. Archived from the original on 2016-10-10.
- Tsafrir, Y.; Leah Di Segni; Judith Green (1994). (TIR): Tabula Imperii Romani. Iudaea, Palestina: Eretz Israel in the Hellenistic , Roman and Byzantine Periods; Maps and Gazetteer. Jerusalem: Israel Academy of Sciences and Humanities. ISBN 965-208-107-8.
