= Battle of al-Kafr =

Battle in 1925 during the Great Syrian Revolt against French rule

Coordinates: 32°37′45″N 36°38′28″E

- Part of The Great Syrian Revolt
Date	22 July 1925
Location	al-Kafr, Jabal al-Druze, French Mandate of Syria
Result	Druze victory

Belligerents
France: Army of the Levant	Syria

Commanders and leaders
(France) Capt. Gabriel Normand	Sultan Pasha al-Atrash

Strength
166 soldiers	150 to thousands of rebels

Casualties and losses
Heavy	N/A

The Battle of al-Kafr was a military engagement between a French Army column commanded by Captain Gabriel Normand and the local Druze and Bedouin forces of Sultan al-Atrash on 22 July 1925. It occurred at Normand's encampment at the village of al-Kafr, in the southern Syrian region of Jabal al-Druze. The battle was a rout for the French, who were ambushed by Sultan's forces. Sultan's victory prompted an upswing of support for him by the Druze and by the end of July, his forces controlled Jabal al-Druze. The battle precipitated the countrywide Great Syrian Revolt.

== Prelude ==
On 12 July, the French arrested three of the al-Atrash clan's five principal sheikhs, Abd al-Ghaffar, Nasib and Hamad, after inviting the sheikhs for negotiations over complaints about the French military governor of Jabal al-Druze State, Captain Carbillet. The invitation was a ruse by the authorities to capture the heads of the al-Atrash clan, who the French viewed as the main agitators of anti-French activity in the Jabal al-Druze. The other two sheikhs, Mit'ib and Sultan al-Atrash, had refused the invitation, and upon learning of the arrest of his kinsmen, Sultan began a recruitment campaign in the mountain's villages for volunteers to join his militia. While the French sought to arrest the al-Atrash sheikhs to prevent a potential revolt by the Druze, the arrests and the deception that was used to lure in the sheikhs provided Sultan with a justification to revolt against the French.

On 18 July, Sultan al-Atrash's fighters downed a French reconnaissance plane that was circling Jabal al-Druze and captured the two men operating the plane around the village of Mitin. Two days later Sultan captured the second largest town in Jabal al-Druze, Salkhad.

== Battle ==
French Captain Gabriel Normand was dispatched from al-Suwayda, the capital of Jabal al-Druze, with a column consisting of 166 Algerian and Syrian sipahi and Syrian Legion troops to rescue the two French airmen who had been captured at Mitin. On the evening of 21 July, Normand's column encamped outside the village of al-Kafr in Jabal al-Druze, on their way to Salkhad. At that time, emissaries of Sultan met with Normand to start negotiations regarding the release of the imprisoned Druze sheikhs, and the withdrawal of Normand's column to al-Suwayda in exchange for concessions from Sultan. Normand refused to negotiate, and decided to carry out his assignment, which was the retrieval of the pilots and the restoration of order in the Jabal al-Druze.

On 22 July, at mid-dawn, Sultan and his forces ambushed Normand's troops. Estimates of Sultan's forces vary from Syrian journalist Munir al-Rayyis's figure of 150 to the French estimate of "thousands". They consisted of Druze from al-Kafr and local Bedouin horsemen from the Sardiyah and Sulut tribes. Sultan's forces emerged from their positions in the surrounding hills and a nearby valley, and broke the French column's defensive square formation. In the fighting, they managed to kill most of Normand's soldiers. Historian Phillipp S. Khoury states that over half of Normand's soldiers were killed, while historians Kais Firro and Daniel Neep state that only a few soldiers survived and managed to inform their superiors of the ambush. The battle lasted around thirty minutes.

== Aftermath ==
Later on 22 July, the same day of the Battle of al-Kafr, Sultan and his forces marched to al-Suwayda and forced the French garrison into the town's citadel, which was subsequently besieged. The Battle of al-Kafr and the siege of al-Suwayda marked the point where both Sultan and the French authorities realized a general uprising had begun, according to Firro. Prior to these events, Sultan's principal goal was the release of the arrested al-Atrash sheikhs from French prison, while the French still considered Sultan's activities as "disturbances". Sultan's victory at al-Kafr swayed the Druze sheikhs of Jabal al-Druze, including those who cultivated friendly ties with the French Mandatory authorities, to join him. By the end of July, Sultan's forces swelled with thousands of Druze volunteers from throughout the area, transforming his small rebel band into an 8,000- to 10,000-strong force. At that time, Sultan's Druze forces, in alliance with the Muslim Sardiyah and Sulut tribes, were in control of all of Jabal al-Druze and were moving onto the Hauran plain, in a position to attack the al-Masmiyah station of the Hejaz Railway.

== Bibliography ==
- Firro, Kais (1992). A History of the Druzes. Vol. 1. BRILL. ISBN 9004094377.
- Khoury, P. (1987). Syria and the French Mandate: The Politics of Arab Nationalism, 1920–1945. Princeton University Press. ISBN 978-1-4008-5839-2.
- Neep, Daniel (2012). Occupying Syria Under the French Mandate: Insurgency, Space and State Formation. Cambridge University Press. ISBN 978-1-107-00006-3.
- Provence, Michael (2005). The Great Syrian Revolt and the Rise of Arab Nationalism. University of Texas Press. ISBN 978-0-292-70680-4.
- Swayd, Sami (2009). The A to Z of the Druzes. Scarecrow Press. ISBN 978-0-8108-7002-4.

Lebanese messages
