= Al-Ghaydah, Suwayda =

Al-Ghaydah الغيضة
- Village
- Location within Syria
- Coordinates: 32°47′29″N 36°42′48″E
- Country: Syria
- Governorate: Suwayda
- District: Suwayda
- Subdistrict: Mushannaf

Population (2004 census)
  - Total: 385
- Time zone: UTC+2 (EET)
  - Summer (DST): UTC+3 (EEST)

Al-Ghaydah (Arabic: الغيضة) is a village situated in the Suwayda District of Suwayda Governorate, in southern Syria. According to the Syria Central Bureau of Statistics (CBS), Al-Ghaydah had a population of 385 in the 2004 census. Its inhabitants are predominantly Druze.

== See also ==
- Druze in Syria
