= Ira, Suwayda =

Ira عرى Areh, 'Ara, Era, Ora
- Village
- Location within Syria
- Coordinates: 32°37′2″N 36°31′53″E
- Grid position: 294/225
- Country: Syria
- Governorate: Suwayda
- District: Suwayda
- Subdistrict: Suwayda

Population (2004)
  - Total: 6,136
- Time zone: UTC+2 (EET)
  - Summer (DST): UTC+3 (EEST)

Ira (Arabic: عرى; also spelled Areh, ′Ara, Era or Ora) is a village in southeastern Syria, administratively part of the Suwayda District of the Suwayda Governorate, located south of Suwayda. According to the 2004 census, it had a population of 6,136. Its inhabitants are predominantly Druze, with a Christian and Sunni Muslim Bedouin minorities. It is one of the villages of the Jabal al-Druze region.

== History ==
In 1596 the village appeared under the name of "Timri" in the Ottoman tax registers as part of the nahiya (subdistrict) of Bani Nasiyya in the Qadaa of Hauran. It had a Muslim population consisting of twenty-five households and fourteen bachelors, and a Christian population of five households. They paid a fixed tax-rate of 40% on agricultural products, including wheat, barley, summer crops, goats and beehives, in addition to occasional revenues; the taxes totaled 16,000 akçe.

In 1838 'Ira was reported to be populated with Druze and Antiochian Greek Christians.

'Ira was resettled by Druze migrants in the early 19th century. It was controlled by the Al Hamdan family, who used it as a secondary headquarters. The Al Hamdan were ousted from 'Ira in 1857 by Ismail al-Atrash. This marked the consolidation of Bani al-Atrash supremacy in Jabal Hauran over the Al Hamdan. Following Ismail's death in 1869, his son Ibrahim became head of the family and was recognized by Rashid Pasha, governor of Damascus, as governor of 'Ira. His brother succeeded him in 1883 and based himself in 'Ira. The village was attacked by Ruwala tribesmen in 1893 during hostilities between the Bani al-Atrash and the Ottomans. Four residents were killed.

== Demographics ==
In 2011, the Melkite Greek Catholic Church had approximately 600 believers.

== Religious buildings ==
- St. Elias (St. Elijah) Greek Orthodox Church
- St. George Melkite Greek Catholic Church
- Jesus the Light of the World National Evangelical Christian Union Church
- Mosque
- Druze Shrine

== See also ==
- Druze in Syria
- Christians in Syria

== Bibliography ==
- Firro, Kais (1992). A History of the Druzes, Volume 1. Brill. ISBN 90-04-09437-7.
- Hütteroth, W.-D.; Abdulfattah, K. (1977). Historical Geography of Palestine, Transjordan and Southern Syria in the Late 16th Century. Erlanger Geographische Arbeiten, Sonderband 5. Erlangen, Germany: Vorstand der Fränkischen Geographischen Gesellschaft. ISBN 3-920405-41-2.
- Robinson, E.; Smith, E. (1841). Biblical Researches in Palestine, Mount Sinai and Arabia Petraea: A Journal of Travels in the year 1838. Vol. 3. Boston: Crocker & Brewster.
