= Al-Kassaib =

Al-Kassaib الكسيب
- Village
- Location within Syria
- Coordinates: 32°48′00″N 36°46′59″E
- Country: Syria
- Governorate: Suwayda
- District: Suwayda
- Subdistrict: Mushannaf

Population (2004 census)
  - Total: 863
- Time zone: UTC+2 (EET)
  - Summer (DST): UTC+3 (EEST)

Al-Kassaib (Arabic: الكسيب) is a village situated in the Suwayda District of Suwayda Governorate, in southern Syria. According to the Syria Central Bureau of Statistics (CBS), Al-Kassaib had a population of 863 in the 2004 census. Its inhabitants are predominantly Druze.

== See also ==
- Druze in Syria
