= Ash-Shurayhi =

Ash-Shurayhi الشريحي
- Village
- Location within Syria
- Coordinates: 32°43′32″N 36°49′23″E
- Country: Syria
- Governorate: Suwayda
- District: Suwayda
- Subdistrict: Mushannaf

Population (2004 census)
  - Total: 945
- Time zone: UTC+2 (EET)
  - Summer (DST): UTC+3 (EEST)

Ash-Shurayhi (Arabic: الشريحي) is a village situated in the Suwayda District of Suwayda Governorate, in southern Syria. According to the Syria Central Bureau of Statistics (CBS), Ash-Shurayhi had a population of 945 in the 2004 census. Its inhabitants are predominantly Druze.

== See also ==
- Druze in Syria
