= Masad, Suwayda =

Masad مصاد Massad
- Village
- Location within Syria
- Coordinates: 32°41′45″N 36°36′5″E
- Grid position: 300/234
- Country: Syria
- Governorate: Suwayda
- District: Suwayda
- Subdistrict: Suwayda

Population (2004 census)
  - Total: 4,585
- Time zone: UTC+2 (EET)
  - Summer (DST): UTC+3 (EEST)

Masad (Arabic: مصاد, also spelled Massad) is a village in southern Syria, administratively part of the Suwayda District of the Suwayda Governorate. According to the 2004 census, it had a population of 4,585. Its inhabitants are predominantly Druze, with a Sunni Muslim Bedouin minority.

== Religious buildings ==
- Maqam Baha al-Din (Druze Shrine)

== See also ==
- Druze in Syria
