= Adham Khanjar =

Prominent Shia Arab leader & Syrian nationalist

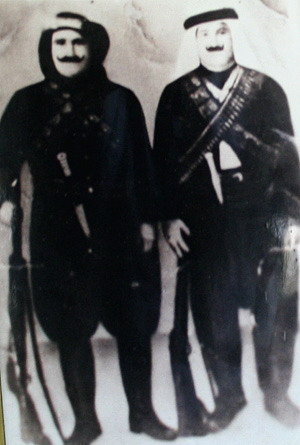
- Adham Khanjar (left) with Sadiq Hamza
- Born: 1890; Al-Marwaniyyeh, Jabal Amel, Ottoman Syria
- Died: 1922 (aged 31–32); Damascus
- Known for: Resisting the French occupation of Lebanon and Syria

Adham Khanjar (Arabic: أدهم خنجر) (1890–1922) was a Lebanese Shia Muslim revolutionary and Syrian nationalist who participated in guerilla warfare against the forces of the French assumption of Lebanon and Syria after the Ottoman Empire was defeated in World War I, and the attempt to assassinate General Gouraud, the French High Commissioner.

Khanjar hailed from the feudal Sa'b family of Jabal Amel in present-day Southern Lebanon. Little is known about his life, but it appears he participated in the Franco-Syrian War in 1920, where he had met Sultan al-Atrash.

== Assassination Attempt ==
Khanjar joined a guerrilla band led by famous Syrian revolutionist Ahmed Mreywed. And on 23 June 1921, the band ambushed the car of General Henri Gouraud, the French High Commissioner in Syria and Lebanon, on its way from Damascus to Quneitra. The general survived the attempt, but Commandant Branet was killed, and the governor of Damascus was wounded in the attack. After the failed attempt, the band members, including Adham, fled to Transjordan.

== The Adham Khanjar Incident ==
In July 1922, Adham and a band of guerillas had tried to cross the border to sabotage the electrical generating station in Damascus, but the band had been dispersed at the border. With the French authorities in pursuit, he sought refuge at the home of Sultan al-Atrash. On July 7, Khanjar had arrived at the village of Al-Qrayya in Jabal al-Druze, but was recognized by two French soldiers and subsequently was captured while he was trying to get water at a well. Khanjar was transferred to Suwayda immediately. From his prison there, he sent a message to Sultan al-Atrash asking for his help, as he was seeking refuge at his house Al-Qrayya. Upon receiving the message, Sultan, who was in nearby village at that time, considered Khanjar's capture as a breach of the Arab traditions of protecting the fugitive, and an attack on him personally. Thus, Sultan went to the provincial capital at Suwayda to protest the breach of customary law before the French authorities, and also sent a series of telegrams to the native and French authorities protesting this breach; but his appeal was rejected by both the native and French authorities. Afterwards, Sultan gathered his brothers and few friends to launch at attack on a French convoy they thought to transport Khanjar, who was sent to Damascus in an airplane that morning. The French retaliated to the destruction of the convoy by issuing warrants to the rebels, bombing their villages and destroying their houses.

== Execution ==
After his transport to Damascus, Khanjar was put to trial and found guilty. He was executed shortly after.

== Legacy ==
Adham Khanjar is hailed as a hero by Syrian nationalists and Lebanese Shias, who along Sultan had sought to expel the French forces from the region. The people of Jabal al-Druze consider the Adham Khanjar incident an example of defending their values of protecting the fugitives, and Khanjar's name is still mentioned today in the traditional songs of the area.
