= Umm Ruwaq =

Umm Ruwaq أم رواق
- Village
- Location within Syria
- Coordinates: 32°47′13″N 36°47′05″E
- Country: Syria
- Governorate: Suwayda
- District: Suwayda
- Subdistrict: Mushannaf

Population (2004 census)
  - Total: 1,296
- Time zone: UTC+2 (EET)
  - Summer (DST): UTC+3 (EEST)

Umm Ruwaq (Arabic: أم رواق) is a village situated in the Suwayda District of Suwayda Governorate, in southern Syria. According to the Syria Central Bureau of Statistics (CBS), Umm Ruwaq had a population of 1,296 in the 2004 census. Its inhabitants are predominantly Druze.

== Religious buildings ==
- Maqam Ibrahim ibn Adham (Druze Shrine)

== See also ==
- Druze in Syria
