= Aslihah =

Aslihah الاصلحة Asleha, Al-Aslihah
- Village
- Location within Syria
- Coordinates: 32°41′13″N 36°28′47″E
- Grid position: 289/233
- Country: Syria
- Governorate: Suwayda
- District: Suwayda
- Subdistrict: Suwayda

Population (2004)
  - Total: 361
- Time zone: UTC+2 (EET)
  - Summer (DST): UTC+3 (EEST)

Aslihah (Arabic: الاصلحة, also spelled Aslihah or Asleha) is a village in southern Syria, administratively part of the Suwayda District of the Suwayda Governorate, located south of Suwayda. In the 2004 census, it had a population of 361. Its inhabitants are predominantly Christians, with a Sunni Muslim Bedouin minority.

== Demographics ==
According to statistics from 1927, Aslihah had a population of 237 inhabitants, all of whom were recorded as Christians.

The inhabitants of Aslihah are predominantly Greek Orthodox Christians. They are estimated to form three-fourths of the total population.

== Religious buildings ==
- St. George Greek Orthodox Church was built in 1934 over an older structure.

== See also ==
- Christians in Syria

== Bibliography ==
- Betts, Robert Brenton (1988). The Druze. Yale University Press. p. 60.
- Boulanger, Robert (1966). The Middle East, Lebanon, Syria, Jordan, Iraq, Iran.
