= Al-Atrash =

Family name

al-Atrash الأطرش
- Current region: Jabal Hauran, Akkar
- Etymology: "the Deaf"
- Origin: Jabal al-A'la, northern Syria (claimed); Hauran (early 19th century)
- Members: Ismail al-Atrash; Sultan al-Atrash; Farid al-Atrash; Asmahan
- Connected families: Bani Isma'il; Bani Najm; Bani Hammud

The al-Atrash (Arabic: الأطرش al-Aṭrash), also known as Bani al-Atrash, is a Druze clan based in Jabal Hauran in southwestern Syria. The family's name al-atrash is Arabic for "the deaf" and derives from one the family's deaf patriarchs. The al-Atrash clan migrated to Jabal Hauran in the early 19th century, and under the leadership of their sheikh (chieftain) Ismail al-Atrash became the paramount ruling Druze family of Jabal Hauran in the mid-19th century, taking over from Al Hamdan. Through his battlefield reputation and his political intrigues with other Druze clans, Bedouin tribes, Ottoman authorities and European consuls, Ismail consolidated al-Atrash power. By the early 1880s, the family controlled eighteen villages, chief among which were as-Suwayda, Salkhad, al-Qurayya, 'Ira and Urman.

Ismail was succeeded by his eldest son Ibrahim and following the latter's death, by Ismail's other son Shibli. Al-Atrash sheikhs led the Druze in numerous revolts against the Ottomans, including the 1910 Hauran revolt. One of its sheikhs, Sultan Pasha al-Atrash, was the chief leader of the Great Syrian Revolt against French rule in Syria in 1925–1927.

== History ==
=== Origins ===
The origins of the Bani al-Atrash family are obscure, according to Druze historian Kais Firro, who asserts that like other prominent Middle Eastern families, "genealogical trees were only reconstructed after the consolidation of a family's power". The Bani al-Atrash claim descent from Ali al-Aks, a ruler of the Jabal al-A'la mountain in the western countryside of Aleppo. This claim is affirmed by several historians of the family, but is viewed skeptically by Firro. Some members of the family claim descent from the Ma'an clan, the Druze power in Mount Lebanon during Mamluk and early Ottoman rule (14th–17th centuries).

The Bani al-Atrash's founders likely migrated to the Hauran in the early or mid-19th century, but a number of theories exist as to the circumstances of their migration. One view holds that a certain Muhammad (the grandfather of Ismail al-Atrash) settled the family there, while another view holds that three brothers of the family from the village of Tursha in Wadi al-Taym migrated to Hauran and settled on territory controlled by the Druze Hamdan clan. The name al-atrash, which means "the deaf" in Arabic, derives from Muhammad's deaf son. It subsequently became an appellation by which Muhammad's family was known. One of Muhammad's son, Ibrahim al-Atrash, was killed in Hauran during the 1838 Druze revolt against Emir Bashir Shihab II and the Egyptian army of Ibrahim Pasha.

=== Leadership of Ismail ===
Ismail al-Atrash, Muhammad's grandson, joined the Druze leader Shibli al-Aryan of Wadi al-Taym in his military intervention on behalf of the Druze of Mount Lebanon in their conflict with the Maronites in the 1840s. Ismail acquired a battlefield reputation among the Druze and succeeded al-Aryan as the virtual leader of the Druze after the latter's death. Ismail was based in the village of al-Qurayya and became independent of the Druze sheikhs who ruled the area. He formed his own mashaykha (sheikhdom) and encouraged Druze and Christian settlement in al-Qurayya. Throughout the 1840s and 1850s, he consolidated his role as the Druze military chieftain in his coreligionists’ entanglements with the Ottoman authorities and local Bedouin tribes. While at times there were hostilities with the Bedouin, Ismail forged friendly ties with the tribes and eventually established an alliance with them against the Ottomans. His son Shibli was a poet who adopted the Bedouin poetic style and whose poems were recited by tribesmen spanning the area between the Hauran and the Sinai Peninsula.

In the 1850s, Ismail rivaled the Hamdan sheikh Wakid al-Hamdan for supremacy in Jabal Hauran, the volcanic mountainous region in eastern Hauran where Druze settlement was concentrated. Wakid and his clan were backed Bani Amer, Azzam, Hanaydi, Abu Assaf and Abu Fakhr clans in the power struggle with the Bani al-Atrash, whose only major ally among the prominent Druze clans was the Qal'ani family. Ismail built a rapport with the British consul in Damascus and virtually all Druze correspondence with the British and French consuls of Damascus bore Ismail's signature. The Ottomans treated Ismail as the de facto ruler of the Druze, although the Hamdan sheikhs continued to assert their traditional authority over the Druze of Jabal Hauran. The sheikhs of the major traditional families petitioned the British consul to compel the authorities to appoint Wakid as the "first sheikh" of Jabal Hauran in October 1856. However, by then, Ismail was the clear power in the region. From his military headquarters in al-Qurayya, his rule marked a significant shift in power relations in the Hauran. In the 1830s, the Bedouin tribes were dominant and the inhabitants of Druze villages were still obligated to pay khuwwa (tribute) to the Bedouin. By the early 1850s, however, the Druze no longer paid the khuwwa, while the Muslim villagers in the Hauran plain continued to do so. Instead, Bedouin tribes paid Ismail in return for permission to water their flocks at fountains and reservoirs located in Ismail's territory.

By 1860, the Bani al-Atrash sheikhdom consisted of al-Qurayya, Bakka and 'Ira. The latter had been a stronghold of the Hamdan clan, but was conquered by Ismail in 1857. Ismail's intervention on behalf of his coreligionists during the 1860 Mount Lebanon civil war further boosted his prestige. In 1866, Ismail was made the regional governor of Jabal Hauran by Rashid Pasha, governor of Syria Vilayet. By 1867, the Bani al-Atrash added Malah, Dhibin, Salkhad, Urman, Umm al-Rumman and Mujaymir to their sheikhdom, and Sahwat Balatah, Khirbet Awad, Jubayb, Kanakir and al-Ruha to their zone of influence. Relations with the Hamdan and Bani Amer clans further deteriorated and the latter families joined the Bedouin Sulut tribe in their war against Ismail in 1868. To put an end to the war, Rashid Pasha replaced Ismail with his son Ibrahim and divided Jabal Hauran into four subdistricts based on the boundaries of the Druze sheikhdoms. The Bani al-Atrash sheikhdom by then had been expanded to include 18 villages (out of some 62 Druze villages in Jabal Hauran).

=== Leadership of Ibrahim ===
Ismail died in November 1869 and a power struggle consequently ensued between his sons Ibrahim and Shibli. The former was recognized by Rashid Pasha as the mudir of Ara, prompting clashes between the latter's partisans within the family and its allied clans. The dispute was settled by the mediation of the authorities in Damascus and Shibli recognized his brother's leadership in January 1870. Early in his administration, Ibrahim captured as-Suwayda, the Al Hamdan's principal headquarters. The move consolidate Atrash dominance among the Druze sheikhs and expanded the family's territory. Peace ensued in Jabal Hauran in the following years, and although a Turkish qaimmaqam administered the qadaa, the Druze sheikhdom system was largely left alone by the authorities.

This relative autonomy of Jabal Hauran changed with the appointment of Midhat Pasha as governor of Damascus in 1878. The governor used two violent incidents between the Druze and the Hauran plainsmen as an opportunity to launch an expedition to enforce direct Ottoman rule in Jabal Hauran. In October 1879, he appointed Sa'id Talhuq, a Druze from Mount Lebanon, as qaimmaqam and gave him authority over a Druze gendarme and established an appeals court and new administrative council. He demanded that the Druze sheikhs pay 10,000 Turkish liras to compensate for the expedition's expenses and give consent for the construction of a road between Jabal Hauran and Lajat to facilitate the construction of an Ottoman garrison in the latter region. The Druze sheikhs rejected the demands, and Ibrahim al-Atrash opposed the appointment of Talhuq and was incensed at Midhat Pasha's administrative reforms. Midhat Pasha was replaced by Hamdi Pasha in August 1880, roughly coinciding with an incident in which Sunni Muslims from al-Karak killed three Druze men, prompting the Druze to massacre 105 inhabitants of the village. A commission was overseen by Hamdi Pasha which eventually concluded with a large Druze payment of blood money (diyya) to al-Karak's inhabitants, who were officially blamed for instigating the massacre, the establishment of an Ottoman garrison outside of as-Suwayda and a series of subdistrict appointments for the Bani al-Atrash sheikhs. Accordingly, Ibrahim al-Atrash was recognized as mudir of as-Suwayda, Shibli in 'Ira, their brother Muhammad in Salkhad and their ally Hazima Hunaydi in al-Majdal. Furthering the Atrash's official legitimacy, Ibrahim was appointed qaimmaqam in January 1883.

The official elevation of Ibrahim, which coincided with an increased Ottoman military presence in Jabal Hauran, was met with dissatisfaction among many Druze, sheikhs and peasants alike. They were particularly angered at the new system of taxation, which was better enforced than years past and was undertaken by Ibrahim on behalf of the state. By late 1887, tensions among the Druze was at boiling point. Conflict with the Sulut had renewed in Lajat and in the ensuing conflict, Ottoman troops intervened and killed between twenty and eighty-five Druze fighters. The Sulut subsequently raided a Druze caravan, killing two and seizing sixty camels. Amid this conflict, Ibrahim stayed out of the fray, causing many Druze to view him as a collaborator with the Ottomans. The following year, the governor of Damascus announced measures that brought the Druze further into Damascus's fold; among the measures was a demand to pay tax arrears, to open five state schools, hand over bandits sought by the authorities and the formation of a gendarme commanded by Ibrahim.

The Bani al-Atrash were forced from their villages during a peasant revolt in 1889, which was initially instigated by clan's chief rival, but resulted in the other prominent clans' expulsion as well. Ibrahim had fought the peasants in June, but was forced to retreat to Damascus along with the other Atrash sheikhs and request Ottoman support. The situation was temporarily settled through mediation by the shuyukh al-uqqal, but the revolt, which was known as the "Ammiyya" was renewed in 1890 and the clans were again expelled from the peasant villages. The Bani al-Atrash and their rivals were restored after Ottoman intervention. The Ottomans' restoration of Bani al-Atrash to their former position was conditioned on a major agrarian reform whereby the peasants were given the right to own property; many became landowners as a result. The shared Druze faith of the dominant clans and the peasants smoothed over relations between them.

=== Leadership of Shibli ===
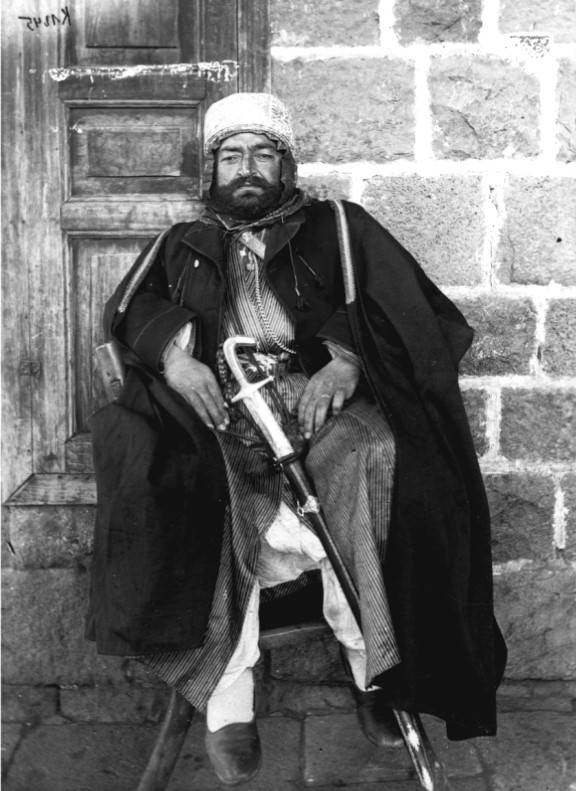
Shibli al-Atrash in Ira, Syria, October 1895

In the early 1890s, Shibli succeeded Ibrahim and contested control over Jabal Hauran which was placed under a governor from outside the district. The Ottomans used the Bedouin Ruwala tribe as an ally and the latter raided Shibli's headquarters in 'Ara, killing four of its inhabitants. Shibli resolved to retaliate and formed an alliance with the Bani Saqr. Before he could launch an operation against the Ruwala, he was arrested by the authorities in Shaqqa on charges of inciting a revolt against the empire. Shibli's brother Yahya organized al-Atrash allies, the Azzam, Abu Fakhr and Nasr clans to retaliate against the Ottomans. The allies assaulted and besieged the Ottoman garrison at al-Mazraa, and several rebels and troops were killed. The Ottomans and Druze sheikhs came to an agreement whereby Shibli would be released and a member of the Khalidi family of Jerusalem, Yusuf Diya al-Khalidi was appointed governor of Jabal Hauran.

=== Twentieth century ===
Between their arrival in Jabal Hauran in the middle to late 19th century until 1963, the Bani al-Atrash was the most prominent clan in Jabal Hauran's social hierarchy. They were divided into three sub-clans, the Bani Isma'il, Bani Hammud and Bani Najm. They were based in the southern half of the mountain, inhabiting or controlling 16 towns and villages: al-Suwayda, Salkhad, al-Qurayya, Qaysama, 'Anz, 'Ira, Rasas, Urman, Malah, Samad, Umm al-Rumman, Awas, al-Annat, al-Hawiyah, al-Ghariyah and Dhibin. However, their influence also extended to the northern half, where they rivaled the Druze Bani Amer and Halabiyah clans. Religiously, Druze society is divided into juhhal and uqqal. The latter consisted of the religious leaders of the community (shuyukh al-uqqal, sing. shaykh al-aql) and their subordinates. The juhhal were not privy to Druze religious secrets made up the majority of the community. While the Bani al-Atrash were the dominant clan of the Druze social elite, they were generally juhhal, with the exception of some members.

In 1909, Zuqan al-Atrash led an unsuccessful rebellion, and was executed in 1910. The al-Atrash family led their fellow Druze in fight against the Ottomans once again during the Arab Revolt until 1918 and the French in 1923 and 1925–1927, headed by Sultan al-Atrash (son of Zuqan al-Atrash). Their influence started to wane after unification and independence of Syria, especially with the death of Sultan Pasha al-Atrash.

Some members of the Atrash family emigrated from Syria to Egypt in the 1920s. Fleeing the French occupation of Syria, 'Alia al-Mundhir al-Atrash, from the House of Sultan al-Atrash, and her three children, Fuad, Farid, and Amal al-Atrash (later known as Asmahan) were sponsored by Egypt's prime minister Saad Zaghloul and later became naturalized citizens. After successful musical careers, Asmahan, Fuad and Farid al-Atrash were buried at the Fustat Plain in Cairo.

The coming to power of the socialist Ba'ath Party during the 1963 Syrian coup d'état did not end the prestige and kinship loyalties of the prominent clans, including the al-Atrash, who continued to have paramount sheikh. While most leading members of the Ba'ath Party from the Druze community hailed from families on the lower socioeconomic scale, a member of the Bani al-Atrash, Mansur al-Atrash, played a major leadership role in the party in the mid-1960s. In 1984, al-Amir Salim al-Atrash was chosen for this role and accorded the "cloak of leadership" by the three shuyukh al-uqqal of the Jabal. The role of Bani al-Atrash sheikh was more ceremonial or symbolic and he had little political power. In the 1990s, the clan had around 5,000 members.

== Notable members ==
- Sultan al-Atrash, leader of the Syrian Revolution.
- Mansur al-Atrash, Syrian politician. Son of Sultan Pasha.
- Farid al-Atrash, Syrian/Lebanese-Egyptian singer and virtuoso oud player.
- Asmahan (stage name of Amal al-Atrash), Syrian/Lebanese-Egyptian singer, sister of Farid.
- Salim al-Atrash, first governor of the State of Jabal al-Druze.
- Jihad Al-Atrash, Lebanese actor and voice actor
- Laila al-Atrash, Jordanian journalist and writer
- Lilia al-Atrash, Syrian Actress

== Bibliography ==
- Bidwell, Robin (1998). Dictionary of Arab History. Kegan Paul International. p. 55. ISBN 9781136162985.
- Firro, Kais (1992). A History of the Druzes. Vol. 1. BRILL. ISBN 9004094377.
- Firro, Kais (2005). "The Ottoman Reforms and Jabal al-Duruz, 1860–1914". In Weismann, Itzchak; Zachs, Fruma (eds.). Ottoman Reform and Muslim Regeneration. I. B. Tauris. ISBN 9780857715388.
- Batatu, Hanna (1999). Syria's Peasantry, the Descendants of Its Lesser Rural Notables, and Their Politics. Princeton University Press. ISBN 0691002541.
- Zuhur, Sherifa (2000). Asmahan's Secrets: Woman, War, and Song. University of Texas Press. ISBN 978-0-292-79807-6.
