= Al-Kafr =

Al-Kafr الكفر
- Village
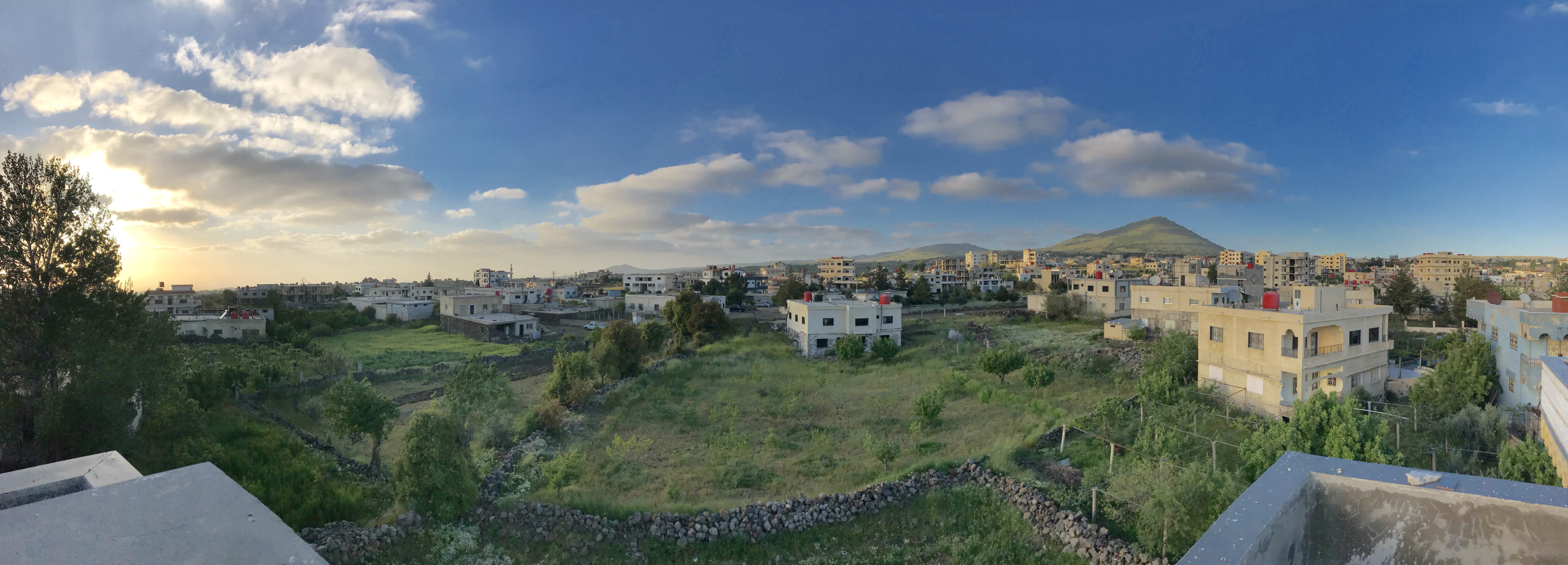
- Al-Kafr village

- Location in Syria
- Coordinates: 32°38′00″N 36°38′30″E
- Grid position: 304/227
- Country: Syria
- Governorate: Suwayda
- District: Suwayda
- Subdistrict: Suwayda
- Elevation: 1,360 m (4,460 ft)

Population (2004 census)
  - Total: 7,458
- Time zone: UTC+2 (EET)
  - Summer (DST): UTC+3 (EEST)

Al-Kafr (Arabic: الكفر, also spelled al-Kefr) is a village in Suwayda Governorate in southern Syria. It is located 8 km to the southeast of Suwayda. It is known for its forest and good wine, and it was the site of a number of battles during the 19th and 20th centuries. According to the Syria Central Bureau of Statistics, al-Kafr had a population of 7,458 in the 2004 census. Its inhabitants are predominantly Druze, with a Sunni Muslim Bedouin minority.

Modern-day al-Kafr was settled by Druze coming from other areas in central Ottoman Syria between 1857 and 1860, at a time when the Druze chieftain Isma'il al-Atrash was becoming the preeminent force of the Jabal al-Druze area over his Druze rivals in the Hamdan clan. Druze settlement in al-Kafr and other villages, like Najran, on the southern borders of the Lajat plain, the Druze were able to encircle the Sulut Bedouin tribe that had dominated the area previously. Al-Kafr was one of two villages (the other being Qanawat) that put up armed resistance to the 30-battalion-strong force assembled by the Ottoman governor Sami Pasha al-Faruqi to suppress the Hauran Druze Rebellion, led by Zuqan al-Atrash, against the government. The Druze sheikhs ultimately surrendered to the government.

During French Mandatory rule, on 22 July 1925, al-Kafr became the site of the Battle of al-Kafr, in which the forces of Sultan al-Atrash routed a French army column sent to defeat Sultan's men at Salkhad. The battle essentially precipitated the countrywide Great Syrian Revolt against French rule.

== Religious buildings ==
- Maqam Sheikh Mohammed (Druze Shrine)

== See also ==
- Druze in Syria
- Battle of al-Kafr

== Bibliography ==
- Firro, Kais (1992). A History of the Druzes. Vol. 1. BRILL. ISBN 9004094377.
