= Isma'il al-Atrash =

Druze sheikh

Ismail al-Atrash (Arabic: إسماعيل الأطرش) (died November 1869) was the preeminent Druze sheikh (chieftain) of Jabal Hauran, a mountainous region southeast of Damascus, in the mid-19th century. His family had moved to the area in the early 19th century. As relative newcomers, they lacked influence in their new home, but Ismail gradually established himself as a power in the village of al-Qurayya and maintained virtual independence from the prominent Druze clans. This was largely due to the battlefield reputation he gained during the campaigns of the Druze leader Shibli al-Aryan in the 1840s. Ismail's leadership of the Druze in territorial struggles with the local Bedouin tribes, relations with the Ottoman authorities and in support of fellow Druze against the Christians during the 1860 Mount Lebanon civil war firmly established his paramountcy. He was a patron of Druze newcomers from Mount Lebanon and with their support he supplanted the Al Hamdan clan as the major force in Jabal Hauran. In 1868, the Ottoman governor of Syria, Rashid Pasha, appointed Ismail as the regional governor (mudir) of Jabal Hauran, drawing the ire of his Druze rivals who formed alliances with the Bedouin tribes and the Muslim peasants of the Hauran plain to restrict Ismail's power. Nonetheless, by then, he controlled 18 villages, many of which were put under the leadership of his eight sons. One of the latter, Ibrahim, became head of the al-Atrash clan following Ismail's death.

== Beginnings ==
Ismail was born to Muhammad al-Atrash. The latter was deaf, hence the family's name, "al-Atrash", which means "the deaf" in Arabic. Ismail's grandfather, also named Ismail, migrated to the Hauran region south of Damascus in the early 19th century. Ismail was first mentioned in the historical record in the early 1840s when he joined Shibli al-Aryan, the Druze leader of Wadi al-Taym, in his efforts to intervene on behalf of the Druze of Mount Lebanon against the Maronites. Ismail gained a repute among the Druze for his battlefield performance and following al-Aryan's death, succeeded him as the virtual military chieftain of the Druze.

Ismail based himself in the village of al-Qurayya in the southern fringe of Jabal Hauran, the eastern mountainous region of Hauran, and was independent from the traditional ruling Druze sheikhs of the region. He encouraged the settlement of al-Qurayya by Druze and Christian peasants and gradually formed his own sheikhdom. Between the 1840s and the 1850s, he led the Druze in their conflicts with the local Bedouin tribes and the Ottoman authorities. He eventually established alliances with the Bedouin tribes, who paid him for access to water sources in his sheikhdom. Many of his encounters with Bedouin tribal chiefs were recorded in the poems of his son Shibli; the poems became well known among the Bedouin, and tribesmen as far as the Sinai Peninsula recited them. He became an intermediary between the Bedouin and the Druze on the one hand and the authorities on the other.

In 1852, he led the Druze sheikhs and their peasants in a revolt against Ottoman conscription orders. Between then and 1857, he undertook significant efforts to expand his sheikhdom into territory controlled by the Hamdan clan, who up until Ismail's rise were the most powerful Druze family in Jabal Hauran. In 1857, he conquered the village of 'Ara, forcing out its sheikh Hazza al-Hamdan, and adding the village to his sheikhdom, which at the time consisted of al-Qurayya and Bakka. He also directed Druze migrants from Mount Lebanon to settle in the villages of Salkhad, Urman, Sahwat al-Khudr, al-Kafr and Hubran, but he did not have control over those villages.

== Consolidation of power ==
During the 1860 Mount Lebanon civil war, Said Jumblatt, the paramount leader of the Druze of the Chouf appealed for Ismail's assistance in the Druze conflict with the Maronites. In his appeal, Jumblatt stated that without Ismail's intervention, the Druze were threatened with extermination. According to Churchill, a British diplomat, Ismail and his men "sprung like tigers from their lairs" in response to Jumblatt's call. Ismail commanded 3,000 fighters toward Wadi al-Taym, from which another 2,000 Druze fighters joined them. Ismail launched surprise and rapid forays against Christian villages and forces in Wadi al-Taym, Zahle and the Beqaa Valley. Ismail was invited to intervene because the Druze "lionized him for his military skills and bravery", according to Druze historian Kais Firro. Following the war, Ismail's leadership of the Druze was further consolidated.

Druze migrants from Mount Lebanon arriving to Jabal Hauran between 1860 and 1867 boosted Ismail's strength and increased his leverage against his chief rivals, the Druze Bani Amer clan. By 1867, he expanded his sheikhdom to include Mujaymir, Dhibin, Urman, Umm al-Rumman, Malah and Salkhad. Moreover, the villages of Sahwat Balatah (controlled by Bani al-Hinnawi), al-Ruha and Kanakir (controlled by Abu Ras), Jubayb (controlled by Bani Sayf) and Khirbet Awad (controlled by Bani Sharaf al-Din) formed part of his zone of influence.

Ismail was pardoned by the authorities for his role in the 1860 civil war in early 1866. In November 1866, Rashid Pasha, the wali (governor) of Syria Vilayet, which included Jabal Hauran, invited Ismail to Damascus. They met on 1 December and Rashid Pasha appointed Ismail mudir (regional governor) of "Jabal al-Druze" (an alternative name for Jabal Hauran). In effect, the Ottomans recognized Ismail's de jure authority in Jabal Hauran, and the official appointment further antagonized the Hamdan and Bani Amer clans, who formed an alliance with the Muslim villagers of the Hauran plain and local Bedouin tribes to curtail Ismail's authority. Husayn al-Hajari, the Druze shaykh al-aql (spiritual leader), mediated the dispute and oversaw a reconciliation agreement whereby the Bani al-Atrash would control 18 villages, while the other prominent families were accorded their own, smaller districts.

In 1868, Ismail and Hazima Hanaydi were accused of involvement in the death of Faris Amer, prompting Faris's successor Asad and Wakid al-Hamdan to join forces with the Bedouin Sulut tribe in their war against Ismail. Rashid Pasha sought to avert a further deterioration in the province and invited the Druze sheikhs for reconciliation talks in Damascus. In the subsequent agreement, Ismail was replaced as mudir by his son Ibrahim. Furthermore, Jabal Hauran was reorganized to be administered by a majlis (council) consisting of the Druze sheikhs and overseen by a qaimmaqam. The area was divided into four nawahi (subdistricts; sing. nahiyah) based on the boundaries of the existing Druze sheikhdoms. Ismail had eight sons and installed each of them to head a major village controlled by the clan; the lesser villages were overseen by the al-Atrash sheikh of Salkhad.

== Death ==
Ismail died in November 1869 and was succeeded by his son Ibrahim. Rumors circled that Ismail died of poisoning and that Wakid of the Bani Amer was responsible. After Ismail's death a power struggle ensued between his sons Ibrahim and Shibli, which ended when the latter recognized his elder brother as Ismail's successor. Shibli eventually assumed his father's role following Ibrahim's death.

== Bibliography ==
- Farah, Caesar E.; Centre for Lebanese Studies (Great Britain) (2000). Politics of Interventionism in Ottoman Lebanon, 1830–1861. I. B. Tauris. ISBN 9781860640568.
- Fawaz, L.T. (1994). An Occasion for War: Civil Conflict in Lebanon and Damascus in 1860. University of California Press. p. 190. ISBN 9780520087828. "Isma'il al-Atrash."
- Firro, Kais (1992). A History of the Druzes. Vol. 1. BRILL. ISBN 9004094377.
