= Al-Mujaymer =

Al-Mujaymer المجيمر
- Village
- Location within Syria
- Coordinates: 32°35′42″N 36°32′02″E
- Grid position: 294/223
- Country: Syria
- Governorate: Suwayda
- District: Suwayda
- Subdistrict: Suwayda

Population (2004 census)
  - Total: 2,746
- Time zone: UTC+2 (EET)
  - Summer (DST): UTC+3 (EEST)

Al-Mujaymer (Arabic: المجيمر) is a village in southern Syria, administratively part of the Suwayda District of the Suwayda Governorate. According to the Syria Central Bureau of Statistics (CBS), Al-Mujaymer had a population of 2,746 in the 2004 census. Its inhabitants are predominantly Druze.

== History ==
In 1596 the village appeared in the Ottoman tax registers named Major, part of the nahiya (Subdistrict) of Bani Nasiyya in the Hauran Sanjak. It had a population consisting of 6 households and 5 bachelors, all Muslim. They paid a fixed tax-rate of 25% on agricultural products, including wheat (1200 a.), barley (450 a.), summer crops (200 a.), goats and beehives (100 a.), in addition to "occasional revenues" (150 a.); a total of 2,000 akçe.

== Religious buildings ==
- Maqam al-Mahdi (Druze Shrine)

== See also ==
- Druze in Syria

== Bibliography ==
- Hütteroth, W.-D.; Abdulfattah, K. (1977). Historical Geography of Palestine, Transjordan and Southern Syria in the Late 16th Century. Erlanger Geographische Arbeiten, Sonderband 5. Erlangen, Germany: Vorstand der Fränkischen Geographischen Gesellschaft. ISBN 3-920405-41-2.
