= Sultan al-Atrash =

Syrian Druze commander (1891–1982)

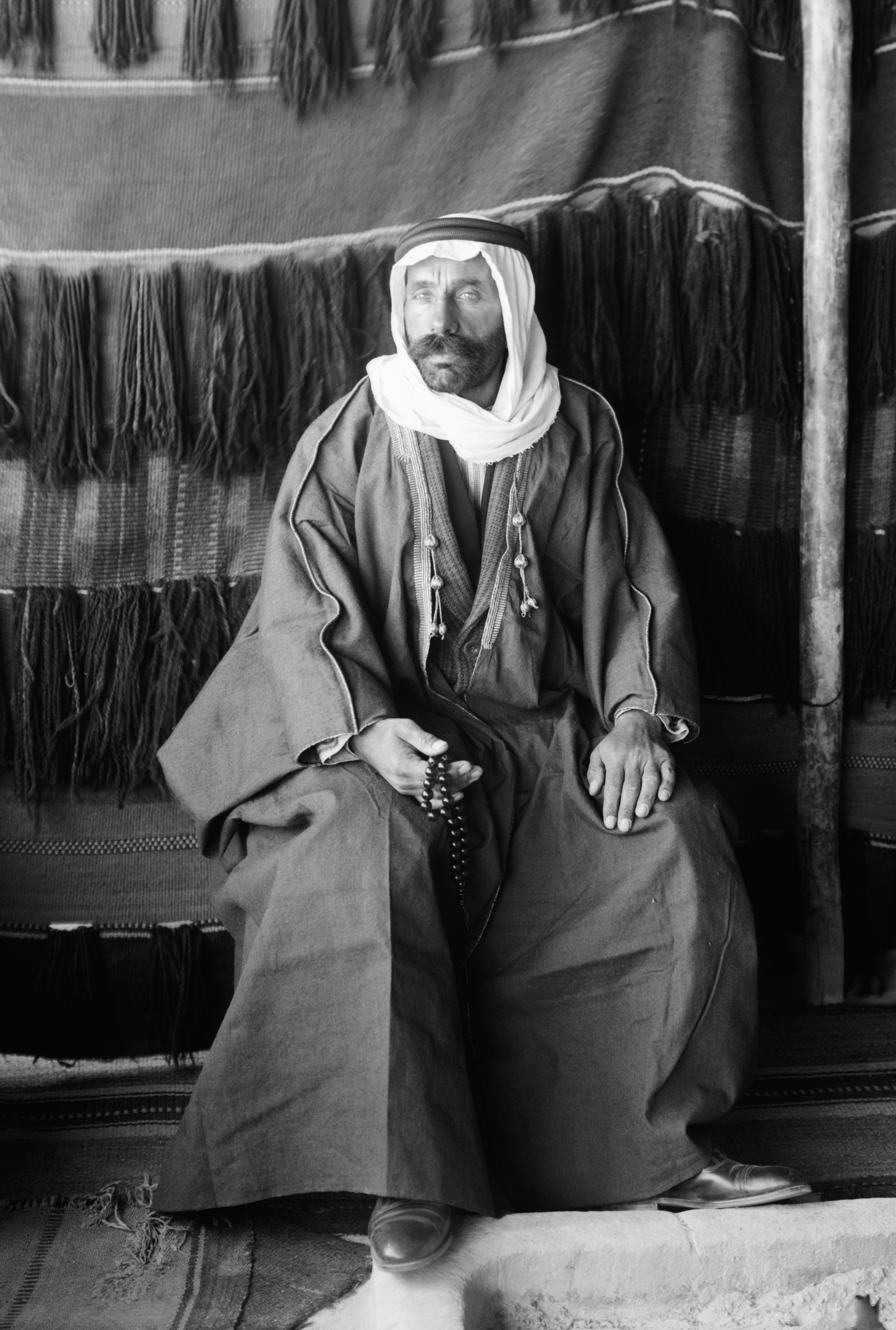
- Al-Atrash in the Arabian desert after the Syrian revolt
- Born: 5 March 1891 al-Qrayya, Ottoman Syria
- Died: 26 March 1982 (aged 91); Al-Qrayya, Syria
- Known for: Leader of the Great Syrian Revolt of 1925–27
- Children: Mansur al-Atrash

Sultan al-Atrash (Arabic: سلطان الأطرش, romanized: Sulṭān al-ʾAṭrash; 5 March 1891 – 26 March 1982) was a Syrian nationalist revolutionary who led the Great Syrian Revolt against the French colonial administration in Syria. One of the most influential figures in Syrian and Druze history, he played a major role in deciding the destiny of Jabal al-Druze and of Syria in general.

== Early life and career ==
Sultan al-Atrash was born in al-Qrayya, a village 20 km south of Suwayda known for the famous Druze family of Al-Atrash, which had nominally governed the region since 1879. His father Zuqan led a fierce battle against the Ottomans near Al-Kefr in 1910, where he faced the forces of Sami Pasha al-Farouqi. He was captured and later executed in 1911.

Sultan al-Atrash was an Ottoman army conscript, serving in the Balkans prior to the outbreak of World War I.

== Role in the Arab revolt ==
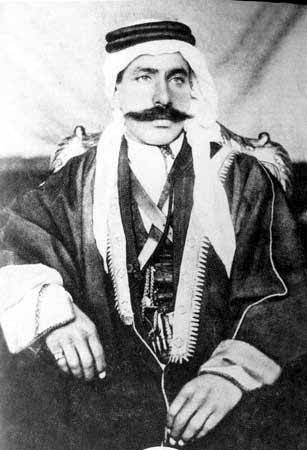
Portrait of Sultan al-Atrash

Sami Pasha used military force and trickery and succeeded at last in occupying Jabal al-Druze. He sent hundreds of young Druze to fight in the Balkans, Sultan among them. However, during the first World War, the Ottomans left Jabal al-Druze in peace as they feared rebellion. Sultan was then able to get in touch with Pan-Arab movements and especially with the Arab Revolt in Hijaz. As the revolt started, he raised the Arab revolt flag on the citadel of Salkhad and on his own house.

According to testimonies from survivors, during the Arab Revolt and the Armenian genocide, he engaged in saving Armenian refugees from the Armenian genocide; for this, he would have been in link with Hussein bin Ali.

When Arab forces reached Aqaba, he sent a thousand men to join the revolt. He joined them himself, with another 300 men, when they reached Bosra. His forces were the first to enter Damascus and raise the Arab revolt flag on the government house on 29 September 1918. Sultan was a good friend of the Hashemite Emir Faisal, leader of the Arab forces in the revolt, and was awarded the title of Emir and the rank of a General in the Syrian army, the equivalent of the title of Pasha. Faisal, later king of Iraq, helped Sultan extensively during his years in exile.

The newly independent kingdom of Syria didn't survive for long, as it was occupied by France after the Battle of Maysalun on 24 July 1920. Sultan was gathering his men to fight the French but the quick succession of events cut his efforts short, as French forces entered Damascus and the country was divided into five states, Jabal al-Druze being one of them.

== Adham Khanjar incident ==
On 7 July 1922, French soldiers captured Adham Khanjar, a Lebanese Shiite rebel who was seeking refuge at Sultan's house while he was away. Khanjar was wanted for attempting to assassinate General Henri Gouraud. Upon his arrival home, Sultan demanded the release of Khanjar, but the French refused. A few days later, Sultan and his men attacked a French convoy they thought to transport Khanjar, who was in fact sent to Damascus by airplane. The French responded by destroying his house and ordering his arrest. Sultan fled to Jordan and subsequently launched raids against French posts. Ten months later, he returned, having been pardoned by the French.

== Syrian Revolution of 1925–27 ==
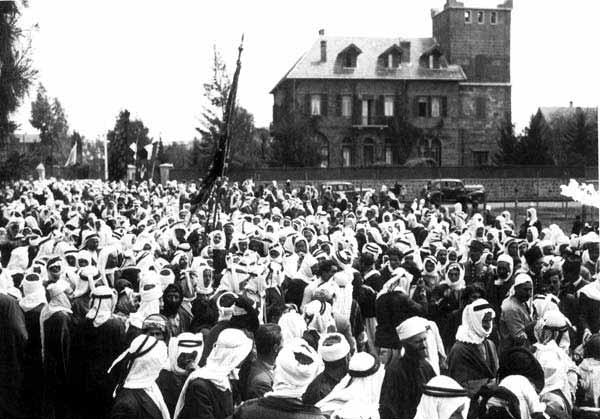
Suwayda celebration for Sultan's and the other rebels' return from exile in 1937

In 1925 Sultan Pasha al-Atrash led a revolt which broke out in the Druze Mountain and spread to engulf the whole of Syria and parts of Lebanon. This is considered one of the most important revolutions against the French mandate, as it encompassed the whole of Syria and witnessed fierce battles between rebel and French forces.

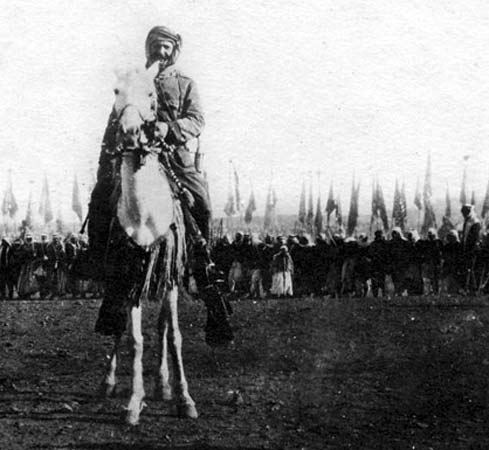
Hilal al-Atrash, Sultan's kinsman and the rebellious sheikh of Rasas, during a ceremony celebrating the release of Syrian rebels

On 23 August 1925, Sultan Pasha al-Atrash officially declared revolution against France, and soon fighting erupted in Damascus, Homs and Hama. Al-Atrash won several battles against the French at the beginning of revolution, notably the Battle of al-Kafr on 21 July 1925, the Battle of al-Mazraa on 2 August 1925, and the battles of Salkhad, Msfirah and as-Suwayda. The Druze were defeated in the latter two battles. After rebel victories against France, it sent thousands of troops to Syria and Lebanon from Morocco and Senegal, equipped with modern weapons, compared to the few supplies of the rebels. This dramatically altered the results and allowed the French to regain many cities, although resistance lasted until the spring of 1927. The French sentenced Sultan al-Atrash to death, but he had escaped with the rebels to Transjordan and was eventually pardoned. He returned to Syria in 1937 after the signing of the Franco-Syrian Treaty. He was met with a huge public reception.

== Role after the revolution ==
Prior to his return to Syria, in 1936, Al-Atrash offered to cooperate with the Jewish Agency in return for their assistance in convincing the Jewish prime minister of France, Léon Blum, to allow his return to Qurayya. Although there's no proof that the Jewish Agency had any role in the French allowing him to return in 1937, Al-Atrash assisted the Jewish Agency by cooperating with the British authorities and Palestinian groups in subduing the 1936–1939 Arab revolt in Palestine during its final stages.

Al-Atrash participated actively in the Levant Crisis, that led to Syrian independence. In 1948 he called for the establishment of a unified Arab Liberation Army of Palestine, for which hundreds of young people had already volunteered and sent to participate in during the 1948 Arab–Israeli War.

During the reign of Adib Shishakli, al-Atrash was often harassed because of his opposition to government policy. He left the Druze Mountain for Jordan in December 1954, and came back when Al-Shishakli's regime fell. Al-Atrash supported the political union of Egypt and Syria in 1958, and firmly opposed the process of separation in 1961. He is also known for his contributions to social life and development in the Druze Mountain.

== Popularity ==
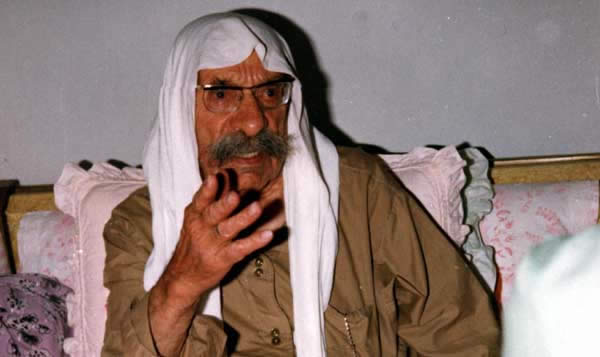
Pasha al-Atrash in his late 80s, at his home at al-Qurayya

Sultan Pasha al-Atrash is one of the most popular of recently prominent leaders in Arab and Syrian history, especially among the Druze.

Many statues of Al-Atrash exist in main squares on Druze Mountain, and his photos hang in many houses in the region. Al-Atrash is also prominent in local folklore, including many poems and popular songs. For several reasons the Druze consider him a symbol of patriotism, courage and secularism:

- Al-Atrash is known for his secularism when he raised the slogan "Religion is for God, the fatherland is for all" (Ad-dīn li-llāh wa-l-waṭan li-l-jamīʿ ) when he led the revolution against the French, which involved rebels belonging to many religions. His speeches and publications were entirely devoid of religious symbols.
- Al-Atrash strongly rejected the French offer of independence for the Druze Mountain. He demanded national Syrian unity.
- He was known for simple living and humility.
- Al-Atrash refused to accept any political office after the independence of Syria in 1946.

During the period of Syrian–Egyptian unity, on a visit to the Suwayda province President Gamal Abdel Nasser honored Sultan Pasha al-Atrash by awarding him the highest medal of the United Arab Republic. In 1970, Syrian President Hafez al-Assad Honored Sultan Pasha al-Atrash for his historic role in the Syrian Revolution.

== Death ==
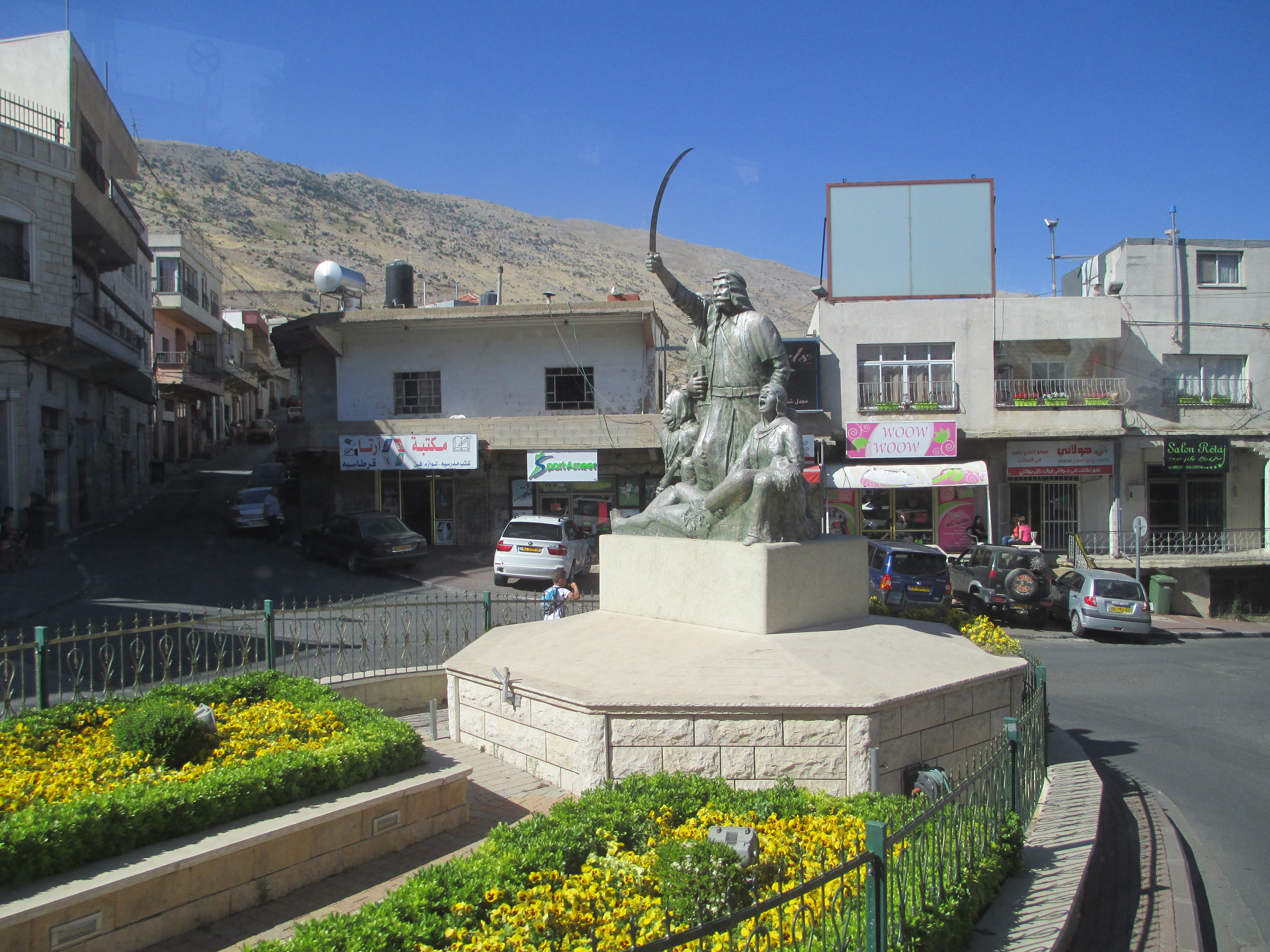
Sculpture of al-Atrash in Majdal Shams.

Sultan Pasha al-Atrash died on 26 March 1982 at the age of 91. The cause was a heart attack.

His funeral was attended by more than a million people, and the Syrian president at the time, Hafez al-Assad issued an individual letter mourning al-Atrash as the General Commander of the Great Syrian Revolt.

== Family ==
His son, Mansur al-Atrash was an active member in the Syrian Regional Branch of the Ba'ath Party until the 1966 Syrian coup d'état led to the downfall of Michel Aflaq, Salah al-Din al-Bitar, Munif al-Razzaz and the classical Ba'athists in general.

His granddaughter, Naila Al Atrash, is a dramatist and activist against the Assad regime.

== See also ==
- Great Syrian Revolt
- Ayyash Al-Haj
- Ibrahim Hananu
- Yusuf al-'Azma
- Abd Al-Rahman Shahbandar
- Hasan al-Kharrat
- Mandate for Syria and the Lebanon
- Henri Gouraud
- Syria
- Adham Khanjar
- Saleh Al-Ali
- Fawzi al-Qawuqji
