= Ammiyya =

Date	1889 – 1890
Location	Ottoman Syria, Ottoman Empire
Result	Revolt successful: Sheikhs restricted to one eighth of the village land; System of land tenure established

Belligerents
Syrian Peasants	Syrian Sheikhs

The Ammiyya (Arabic: الثورة العامية في جبل حوران, althawrat aleamiat fi jabal hawran, or Arabic: ʿĀmmiyya) was a revolt against Ottoman rule in Syria in 1889–1890. The tenant farmers and farmworkers sought to curb the abuses of local sheikhs, restricting them to one eighth of the communal land. They also wanted to partition the rest of the communal land into individual plots outside the sheikh's control, ending their ability to evict poor farmers.

Druze opposition was led by the Atrash family.

The revolt was largely successful in its aims, restricting the sheikhs to one eighth of the village land and establishing the system of land tenure which continued in Syria through the Assad regime. Desire to placate the locals also prompted the concessions to French and Belgian companies that led to the DHP, the area's first railway.

== See also ==
- Long Depression, the economic depression at the time which caused falling prices for Hawran wheat
- Abdul Hamid II, the sultan at the time

== Bibliography ==
- Forni, Nadia (2003), "Land Tenure and Labour Relations", in Fiorillo, Ciro; Vercueil, Jacques (eds.), Syrian Agriculture at the Crossroads, FAO Agricultural Policy and Economic Development Series, No. 8, Rome: FAO, pp. 309–334, ISBN 92-5-104990-4.
- Provence, Michael, "An Investigation into the Local Origins of the Great Revolt", France, Syrie, et Liban 1918--1946, pp. 377–393.
- Schilcher, Linda S. (1998), "Railways in the Political Economy of Southern Syria 1890–1925", The Syrian Land: Processes of Integration and Fragmentation: Bilād al-Shām from the 18th to the 20th Century, Berliner Islamstudien [Islamic Studies in Berlin], Vol. 6, Stuttgart: Franz Steiner Verlag, pp. 97–112, ISBN 3-515-07309-4.
- Swayd, Samy (10 March 2015), Historical Dictionary of the Druzes, Rowman & Littlefield, ISBN 9781442246171.
