= Hibran, Suwayda =

Hibran حبران Hebran, Hubran
- Village
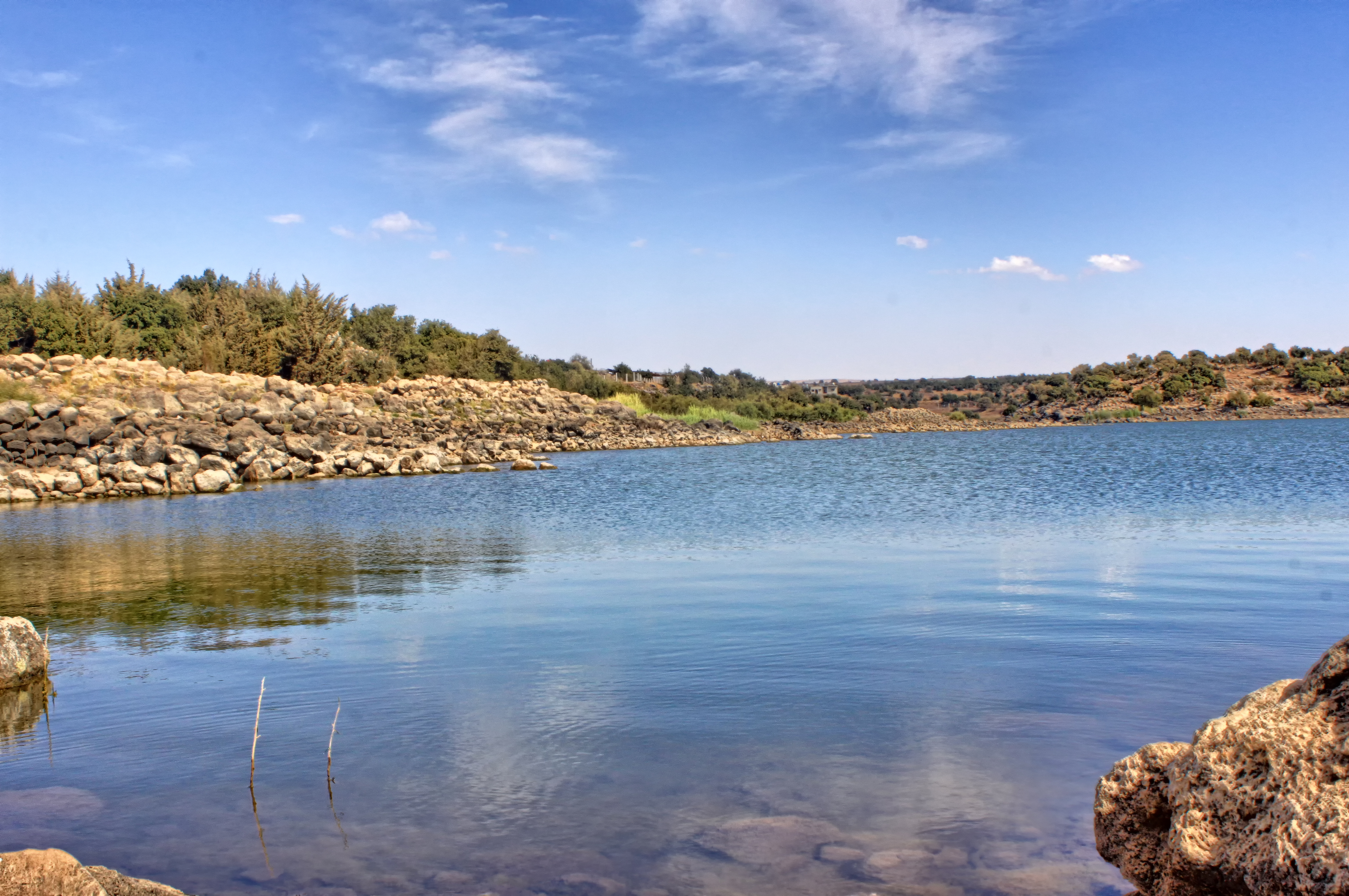
- Hibran dam

- Location within Syria
- Coordinates: 32°36′20″N 36°38′21″E
- Grid position: 303/224
- Country: Syria
- Governorate: Suwayda
- District: Suwayda
- Subdistrict: Suwayda

Population (2004 census)
  - Total: 3,166
- Time zone: UTC+2 (EET)
  - Summer (DST): UTC+3 (EEST)

Hibran (Arabic: حبران, romanized: Ḥibrān , also spelled Hebran or Hubran), is a village in southern Syria, administratively part of the Suwayda Governorate, located south of Suwayda. According to the Syria Central Bureau of Statistics (CBS), Hibran had a population of 3,166 in the 2004 census. Its inhabitants are predominantly Druze.

== History ==
Hibran was noted in the 1596 Ottoman census under the name of Hubran an-Nasara, being located in the nahiya of Bani Nasiyya in the Liwa of Hawran. It had a population of 23 households and 14 bachelors; all Muslim. They paid a fixed tax-rate of 40% on various agricultural products, including wheat (=1500 akçe), barley (900), summer crops (900), goats and beehives (100); a total of 3,400 akçe.

Ottoman tax records indicate the revenues of Hibran were farmed out to Muhammad Alam al-Din, a Druze emir who fled Mount Lebanon in 1667, in 1669–1671.

According to the historian Kais Firro, Hibran was one of twenty-eight villages in the Hauran settled by Druze before 1812; in 1838 Hibran was noted as Druze village by Eli Smith.

The Druze chieftain Ismail al-Atrash encouraged further Druze migration to Hibran, among a number of other Hauran villages, from Mount Lebanon in the 1850s.

== Archaeology ==
Archaeological remains at Hebrān include the ruins of a Roman-era temple, first documented by a Princeton University expedition in the early 20th century. Heavy plundering for building material had obscured much of the original layout, but the remains of capitals, column pieces, and niche remnants suggest the temple had a distyle in antis plan. An inscription dates the temple's construction to 155 AD, though it does not name the deity to whom it was dedicated. Several altars found at the site name multiple gods, including Zeus and Athena.

Some fragments at the site were initially identified as Nabataean and thought to belong to an earlier colonnaded precinct, but analysis suggests their carved decoration is instead typical of rural temples elsewhere in the Hauran region. Another inscription, dating from 47 AD, points to early religious activity at the site, recording the construction of a temple door under a priest of the Arabian goddess Al-Lat. Other finds include a dedication to the god Lycurgus by a Roman veteran and a statue of an eagle in a Nabataean artistic style.

== Religious buildings ==
- Maqam Baha al-Din (Druze Shrine)

== See also ==
- Druze in Syria

== Bibliography ==
- Firro, Kais (1992). A History of the Druzes. Brill. ISBN 90-04-09437-7.
- Hourani, Alexander (2010). New Documents on the History of Mount Lebanon and Arabistan in the 10th and 11th Centuries H. Beirut.
- Hütteroth, W.-D.; Abdulfattah, K. (1977). Historical Geography of Palestine, Transjordan and Southern Syria in the Late 16th Century. Erlanger Geographische Arbeiten, Sonderband 5. Erlangen, Germany: Vorstand der Fränkischen Geographischen Gesellschaft. ISBN 3-920405-41-2.
- Mazzilli, Francesca (2018). Rural Cult Centres in the Hauran: Part of the Broader Network of the Near East (100 BC–AD 300). Archaeopress Roman Archaeology. Oxford: Archaeopress.
- Robinson, E.; Smith, E. (1841). Biblical Researches in Palestine, Mount Sinai and Arabia Petraea: A Journal of Travels in the year 1838. Vol. 3. Boston: Crocker & Brewster.
