= Awas, Suwayda =

Awas عوس
- Village
- Location within Syria
- Coordinates: 32°28′10″N 36°46′18″E
- PAL: 317/209
- Country: Syria
- Governorate: Suwayda
- District: Salkhad
- Subdistrict: Salkhad

Population (2004 census)
  - Total: 308
- Time zone: UTC+2 (EET)
  - Summer (DST): UTC+3 (EEST)

Awas (Arabic: عوس) is a village situated in the Salkhad District of Suwayda Governorate, in southern Syria. According to the Syria Central Bureau of Statistics (CBS), Awas had a population of 308 in the 2004 census. Its inhabitants are predominantly Druze.

== History ==
In 1596, it appeared in the Ottoman tax registers as Us, as part of the nahiya (subdistrict) of Bani Malik as-Sadir, in the Hauran Sanjak. It had an entirely Muslim population consisting of 7 households and 1 bachelors. They paid a fixed tax-rate of 20% on agricultural products, including wheat (3000 a.), barley (450 a.), summer crops (100 a.) goats and beehives (50 a.), in addition to "occasional revenues" (100 a.); the taxes totalled 3,700 akçe.

In 1838, Eli Smith noted it as 'Auwas, a ruin located east of Salkhad.

== See also ==
- Druze in Syria

== Bibliography ==
- Hütteroth, W.-D.; Abdulfattah, K. (1977). Historical Geography of Palestine, Transjordan and Southern Syria in the Late 16th Century. Erlanger Geographische Arbeiten, Sonderband 5. Erlangen, Germany: Vorstand der Fränkischen Geographischen Gesellschaft. ISBN 3-920405-41-2.
- Robinson, E.; Smith, E. (1841). Biblical Researches in Palestine, Mount Sinai and Arabia Petraea: A Journal of Travels in the year 1838. Vol. 3. Boston: Crocker & Brewster.
