= Jabal Druze State =

1921–1936 autonomous state in the French Mandate of Syria

State of Jabal al-Druze Djebel Druze جبل الدروز
- 1 May 1921–9 September 1936
- Flag

- Location of Jabal al-Druze (blue) in the Mandate for Syria and the Lebanon
- Status: Mandate of France
- Capital: As-Suwayda
- Common languages: French; Arabic
- Religion: Christianity; Druze; Sunni Islam
- Governor
  - 1921–1923: Prince Salim Basha al-Atrash
  - 1935–1936: Pierre Tarit
- Historical era: Interwar period
  - Established: 1 May 1921
  - Named "State of Souaida": 4 March 1922
  - Named "Jabal al-Druze": 1 June 1927
  - Disestablished: 9 September 1936
Preceded by	Succeeded by
State of Damascus	First Syrian Republic

Jabal al-Druze (Arabic: جبل الدروز, French: Djebel Druze) was an autonomous state in the French Mandate of Syria from 1921 to 1936, designed to function as a government for the local Druze population under French oversight.

A separate independent Druze state to be established in the Golan Heights was proposed by Israeli politician Yigal Allon in his Allon Plan.

== Nomenclature ==
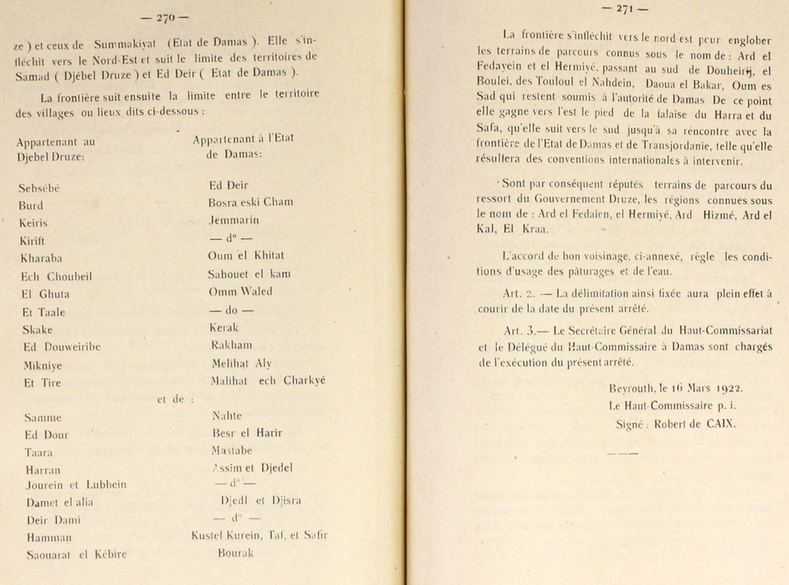
Arrete No. 1343, which laid out the borders of the State of Jebel Druze, March 1922

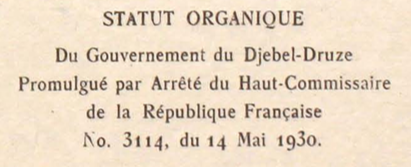
Statut Organique of the State of Jebel Druze, 14 May 1930

On 4 March 1922, it was proclaimed as the State of Souaida, after the capital As-Suwayda, but in 1927 it was renamed Jabal al-Druze or Jabal Druze State. The name comes from the Jabal al-Druze mountain.

== History ==
The Druze state was formed on 1 May 1921 in former Ottoman territory, while other statelets were installed in other parts of the Syrian mandate (e.g. the Alawite State in the Lattakia region). Jabal al-Druze was home to about 50,000 Druze. It was the first, and remains the only, autonomous entity to be populated and governed by Druze. The 1925 Syrian Revolution began in Jabal al-Druze under the leadership of Sultan al-Atrash, and quickly spread to Damascus and other non-Druze areas outside the Jabal al-Druze region. Protests against the division of Syrian territory into statelets were a main theme of Syrian anti-colonial nationalism, which eventually won the victory to reunite the entire French-mandated territory, except Lebanon (which had become independent) and the Sanjak of Alexandretta, which was annexed to Turkey as the Hatay Province.

As a result of Syrian nationalist pressure, under the Franco-Syrian Treaty of 1936, Jabal al-Druze ceased to exist as an autonomous entity and was incorporated into Syria.

General distribution of population in the State of Jabal Druze according to the French census in 1921–22
Religion	Inhabitants	Percentage
Druze	43,000	84.8%
Christians	7,000	13.8%
Sunni	700	1.4%
Total	50,700	100%

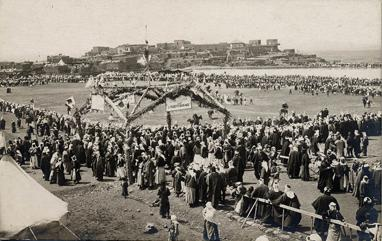
Druze celebrating their independence in 1925

== Governors ==
- Amir Salim Pasha al-Atrash (1 May 1921 – 15 September 1923)
- Trenga (provisional) (September 1923 – 6 March 1924)
- Gabriel Marie Victor Carbillet (6 March 1924 – 14 October 1925), provisional to 1 October 1924
- Sultan Pasha al-Atrash (18 July 1925 – 1 June 1927), chief of state; in dissidence
- Charles Andréa (15 October 1925 – 1927)
- Marie Joseph Léon Augustin Henry (1927)
- Abel Jean Ernest Clément-Grancourt (1927–1932)
- Claude-Gabriel-Renaud Massiet (3 February 1932 – 28 January 1934)
- Justin-Antoine Devicq (1934–1935)
- Pierre-Joseph-François Tarrit (1935 – 2 December 1936)

== See also ==
- Druze in Syria
- Jaysh al-Muwahhideen
