= Jabal al-Druze =

Geographic region in southern Syria

- Jabal al-Druze; Jabal Hauran
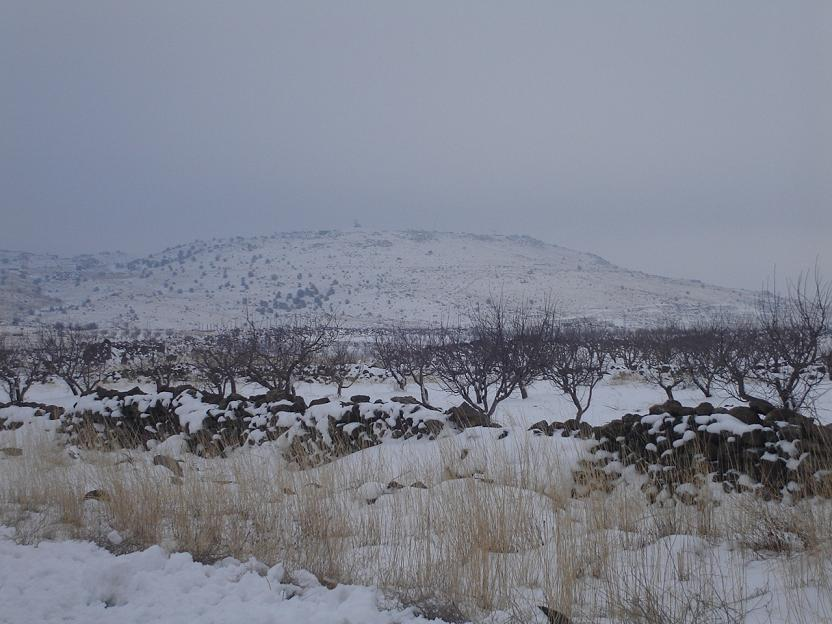
- Tell Qeni, the highest peak of Jabal al-Druze

Highest point
- Peak: Tell Qeni, Suwayda Governorate, Syria
- Elevation: 1,803 m (5,915 ft)
- Coordinates: 32°40′N 36°44′E

Naming
- Etymology: Named after the Druze people who inhabit the region
- Native name: جبل الدروز
- English translation: Mountain of the Druze

Geography
- Location within Syria
- Location: As-Suwayda Governorate, Syria
- Country: Syria
- Region: As-Suwayda Governorate
- Settlement(s): As-Suwayda, Shahba, Salkhad
- Parent range: Hauran
- Biome: Eastern Mediterranean conifer–sclerophyllous–broadleaf forests

Geology
- Formed by: Volcanism
- Rock age: Pleistocene to Holocene
- Mountain type: Volcanic field
- Rock type: Basalt
- Volcanic zone: Harrat al-Sham
- Last eruption: Holocene

Jabal al-Druze (Arabic: جبل الدروز, romanized: Jabal ad-Durūz, lit. 'Mountain of the Druze'), also known as Jabal al-Arab or Jabal Hauran, is an elevated volcanic region in Hauran in the Suwayda Governorate of southern Syria. Most of the inhabitants of this region are Druze, and there are also significant Christian communities. Safaitic inscriptions were first found in this area. The Jabal Druze State was an autonomous area in the French Mandate for Syria and the Lebanon from 1921 to 1936, which had 42 of the Haurans ~180 towns. In the past, the name Jabal al-Druze was used for a different area, located in Mount Lebanon.

In Syria, most Druze reside in Suwayda Governorate, which encompasses almost all of Jabal al-Druze. This governorate is unique in Syria as it has a Druze majority. Additionally, it has integrated Christian communities that have long coexisted harmoniously with the Druze in these mountains.

In the 1980s Druze made up 87.6% of the population, Christians (mostly Greek Orthodox) 11% and Sunni Muslims 2%. In 2010, the As-Suwayda governorate has a population of about 375,000 inhabitants, Druze made up 90%, Christians 7% and Sunni Muslims 3%. Due to low birth and high emigration rates, the Christian proportion in As-Suwayda had declined.

== Geology ==
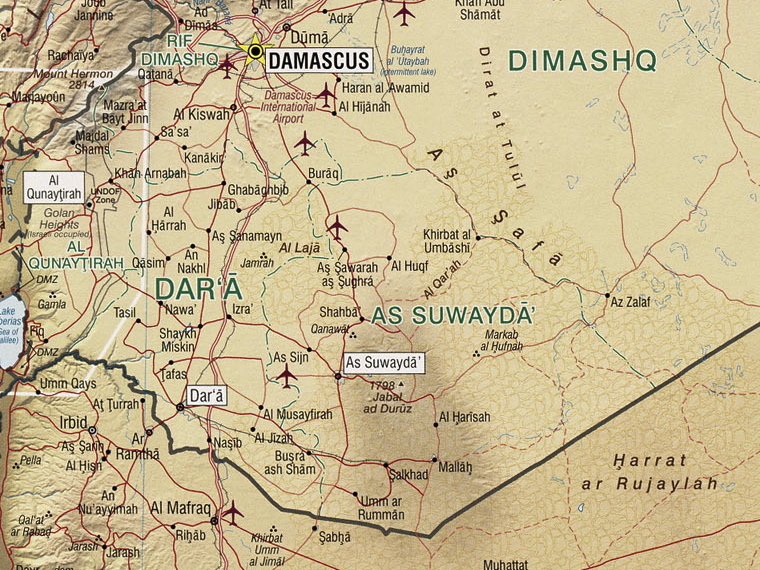
Map of Jabal al-Druze

The Jabal al-Druze volcanic field, the southernmost in Syria, lies in the Haurun-Druze Plateau in SW Syria near the border with Jordan. The most prominent feature of this volcanic field is 1800m-high Jabal al-Druze (also known variously as Jabal ad Duruz, Djebel Al-Arab, Jabal Druze, Djebel ed Drouz). The alkaline volcanic field consists of a group of 118 basaltic volcanoes active from the lower-Pleistocene to the Holocene (2.6 million years ago to present). The large SW Plateau depression is filled by basaltic lava flows from volcanoes aligned in a NW-SE direction. This volcanic field lies within the northern part of the massive alkaline Harrat al-Sham (also known as Harrat al-Shaam) volcanic field that extends from southern Syria to Saudi Arabia.

== Peaks ==
- Tell Qeni (1,803 m)
- Tell Joualine (1,732 m)
- Tell Sleiman (1,703 m)
- Tell Qleib (1,698 m)
- Tell Abou-Hamra (1,482 m)
- Tell El-Ahmar (1,452 m)
- Tell Abed-Mar (1,436 m)
- Tell Khodr-Imtan (1,341 m)
- Tell Azran (1,220 m)
- Tell Shihan (1,138 m)

In Arabic, the word "tell" means "mound" or "hill", but in Jabal al-Druze it rather refers to a volcanic cone.

== See also ==
- Druze in Syria
- Jabal Druze State
- List of volcanoes in Syria
