= Suwayda District =

Suwayda District منطقة السويداء
- District
- Map of Suwayda District within Suwayda Governorate
- Coordinates (Suwayda): 32.7°N 36.57°E
- Country: Syria
- Governorate: Suwayda
- Seat: Suwayda
- Subdistricts: 3 nawāḥī

Area
  - Total: 2,804.22 km^{2} (1,082.72 sq mi)

Population (2026)
  - Total: 1,035,000
  - Density: 369.1/km^{2} (955.9/sq mi)
- Geocode: SY1300

Suwayda District (Arabic: منطقة السويداء, romanized: manṭiqat as-Suwaydā’) is a district of the Suwayda Governorate in southern Syria. The administrative centre is the city of Suwayda. At the 2004 census, the district had a population of 180,907.

== Sub-districts ==
The district of Suwayda is divided into three sub-districts or nawāḥī (population as of 2004):

Subdistricts of Suwayda District
Code	Name	Area	Population
SY130000	Suwayda Subdistrict	691.13 km^{2}	147,146
SY130001	al-Mazraa Subdistrict	202.53 km^{2}	16,627
SY130002	al-Mushannaf Subdistrict	1,910.57 km^{2}	17,134

== See also ==
- List of populated places in Suwayda Governorate
