= Yusuf al-Azma =

Syrian minister of war

- یوسف العظمة
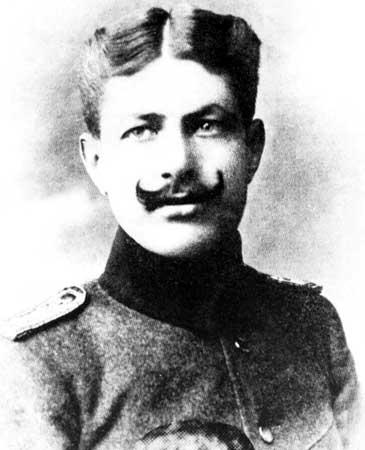
- Al-Azma as Minister of War in 1920

Minister of War and Chief of General Staff of Syria
- In office January 1920 – 24 July 1920
- Monarch: Faisal I
- Prime Minister: Hashim al-Atassi
- Preceded by: Office established (Minister of War); Yasin al-Hashimi (Chief of General Staff)
- Succeeded by: Offices abolished

Personal details
- Born: 1883 Damascus, Ottoman Empire
- Died: 24 July 1920 (aged 36–37) Maysalun, Arab Kingdom of Syria
- Party: Al-Fatat
- Children: Laila
- Education: Ottoman Military Academy

Military service
- Allegiance: Ottoman Empire (1909-1918); Arab Kingdom of Syria (1918-1920)
- Branch/service: Ottoman Army (1909–18); Arab Army (1920)
- Years of service: 1909–1920
- Battles/wars: Italo-Turkish War; First World War; Middle Eastern theatre; Franco-Syrian War; Battle of Maysalun †

Yusuf al-Azma (Arabic: يوسف العظمة, Turkish: Yusuf el-Azma; ALA-LC: Yūsuf al-ʻAẓmah; 1883 – 24 July 1920) was a Syrian military officer and revolutionary figure who was the minister of war of the Arab Kingdom of Syria under the governments of prime ministers Rida al-Rikabi and Hashim al-Atassi, and the Arab Army's chief of general staff under King Faisal. He served as minister of war from January 1920 until his death while commanding Syrian forces at the Battle of Maysalun during the Franco-Syrian War.

Al-Azma hailed from a wealthy Damascene landowning family. He became an officer in the Ottoman Army and fought on multiple fronts in the First World War. After the defeated Ottomans withdrew from Damascus, al-Azma served Emir Faisal, the leader of the Arab Revolt, and was appointed minister of war upon the establishment of the Arab government in Damascus in January 1920. He was tasked with building the nascent Arab Army of Syria. The country, meanwhile, had been designated as a mandatory territory of France, which did not recognize Faisal's government. Al-Azma was among the more vociferous opponents of French rule and as their troops advanced toward Damascus from Lebanon, he was authorized to confront them. Leading a motley army of civilian volunteers, ex-Ottoman officers and Bedouin cavalrymen, al-Azma engaged the French at Maysalun Pass but was killed in action and his soldiers dispersed, which allowed the French to occupy Damascus on 25 July 1920. Though his army was defeated, al-Azma became a national hero in Syria for his insistence on confronting the French despite their clear military superiority and his ultimate death in the ensuing battle.

== Early life and family ==
Al-Azma was born to a prominent mercantile and landowning Damascene family of Turkmen descent in 1883. Members of his family formed part of the Ottoman Syrian establishment; al-Azma's brother Aziz Bey served as a district governor while many of his relatives were Ottoman officers, including al-Azma's nephew Nabih Bey. Al-Azma was married to a Turkish woman, with whom he had a daughter named Laila. Laila was a young child when al-Azma died, married Cevad Asar, an Istanbul-based Turkish merchant with whom she had a son named Celal. Many members of the al-Azma family in Syria later became bankers, landowners and merchants in post-Mandatory Syria and one member, Bashir al-Azma, served as prime minister of Syria in 1962.

== Military career with the Ottomans ==
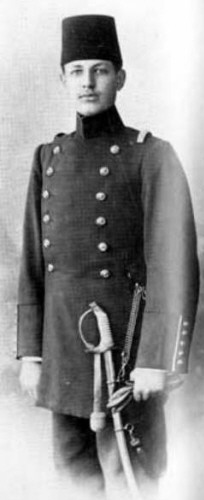
Portrait of al-Azma in uniform after his graduation from the Ottoman Military Academy in 1906

Al-Azma graduated from the Istanbul-based Ottoman Military Academy in 1906 and was a member of the underground reformist Committee of Union and Progress. After graduating, he underwent additional military training in Germany until returning to Istanbul in 1909. From there he was promptly assigned as a military attaché to Cairo, Egypt. In 1914, al-Azma was commander of the Ottoman Army‘s 25th Infantry Division during World War I. Later during the war, he was reassigned as a deputy of War Minister Enver Pasha in Istanbul.

Toward the war's end, al-Azma was appointed chief of staff of the Istanbul-based First Ottoman Army according to historian Phillip S. Khoury, or chief of staff of the Ottoman army in the Caucasus according to historian Ruth Roded. According to historian Michael Provence, it is "widely believed" that soon after this post, al-Azma joined the Arab Revolt against the Ottomans launched by Sharif Hussein of Mecca in 1916, "but he actually served as a decorated Ottoman frontline officer until October 1918". That month, Damascus was captured by the Arab Revolt's British-backed Sharifian Army led by Hussein's son Emir Faisal. Al-Azma subsequently returned to Damascus. He joined al-Fatat, an Arab nationalist secret society founded in 1911, though it is not apparent when, and became a personal chamberlain of Emir Faisal. Unlike other ex-Ottoman officers from the empire's Arab lands who had hailed almost exclusively from modest upbringings, al-Azma came from the upper urban class. In January 1919, Faisal appointed al-Azma as Damascus' military delegate to Beirut.

== Minister of War ==
=== Appointment ===
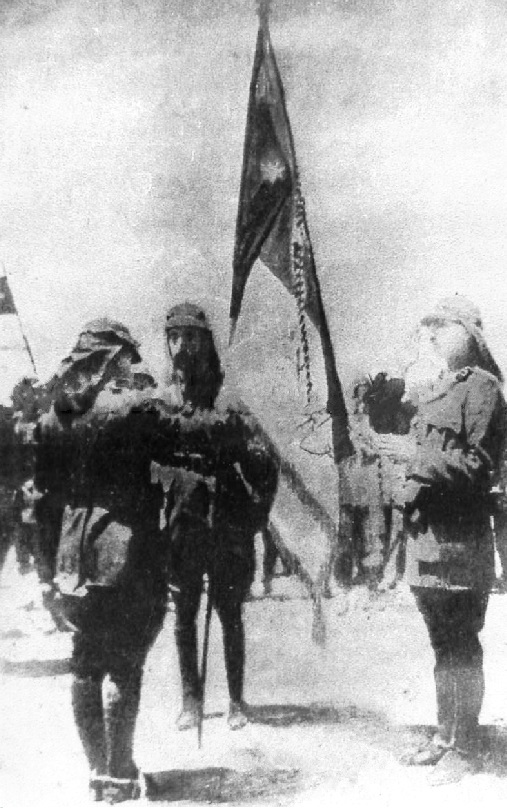
Al-Azma saluting King Faisal (center), 1920

In Prime Minister Rida al-Rikabi's government, al-Azma was promoted to minister of war and on 26 January 1920 was also appointed Chief of General Staff by Emir Faisal to replace Yasin al-Hashimi, who had been arrested by British forces and detained in Palestine. Al-Azma's Damascene roots and reputation as a local and decorated Ottoman wartime general made him "an obvious choice for minister of war", according to Provence, despite having fought against the Arab Revolt months prior. During his time in office, al-Azma established the foundations and hierarchy of the modern-day Syrian Army, according to historian Sami Moubayed. He gathered arms and ammunition left behind by the Ottoman Army in Syria, raised funds for new weaponry and by mid-1920, had created a military force of some 10,000 men, primarily consisting of Bedouin volunteers and former Ottoman officers.

=== Opposition to the French Mandate ===
Faisal declared the Arab Kingdom of Syria in March 1920. However, in the secret 1916 Sykes–Picot Agreement between the United Kingdom and France, the two powers negotiated the division of the Ottomans' Arab territories between themselves, and the League of Nations gave France a Mandate over Syria in April 1920. Afterwards, two principal camps emerged in the Syrian government; the minority faction favored a compromise with France due to its military superiority over the Arab forces (especially since the British withdrew their backing for King Faisal), while the majority faction rejected French rule by all means. Al-Rikabi led the minority faction while the majority camp was led by al-Azma and supported by other young former Ottoman officers. Most of the Syrian government, including Foreign Minister Abd al-Rahman Shahbandar, backed al-Azma's faction.

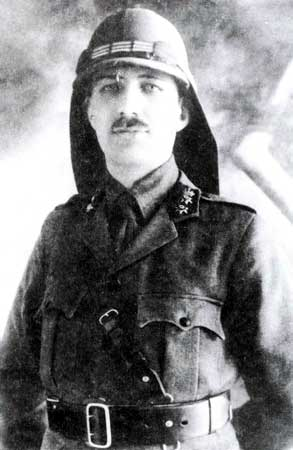
Al-Azma in military uniform as Syria's minister of war

French forces commanded by General Henri Gouraud had landed in Beirut on 18 November 1919. Gouraud was determined to bring all of Syria under French control and demanded the immediate deployment of French forces to the Beqaa Valley between Beirut and Damascus. Against King Faisal's wishes, his delegate to General Gouraud, Nuri al-Said, agreed to the French deployment. However, when a French officer was assaulted by Shia Muslim rebels opposed to the French presence, Gouraud violated his agreement with al-Said and occupied the large town of Baalbek. The French deployment along the Syrian coast and the Beqaa Valley contributed to unrest throughout Syria and sharpened political divisions between al-Azma's camp and those who sought compromise with the French.

In northern Syria, an Alawite revolt led by Saleh al-Ali and a revolt in the Aleppo region led by Ibrahim Hananu were launched in response to the French presence. On 10 December 1919, Prime Minister al-Rikabi resigned amid pressure from the nationalists and popular opinion. The revolts derived military support from Mustafa Kemal's insurgents in Anatolia and from Faisal's government. In June 1920, al-Azma toured northern Syria to recruit more soldiers into the nascent Arab Army and establish connections with the Anatolian insurgency. Al-Azma sensed resistance to his conscription campaign, particularly in Aleppo, but managed to gather some troops. French forces later occupied parts of northern Syria in early July 1920.

On 13 July, al-Azma declared emergency measures in the Syrian National Congress, including press censorship, the power to seize civilian vehicles for military use and a call for militias across the country to support the army. Inspired by Kemal's successes against the French in Turkey, al-Azma sought to follow in the latter's path in Syria. Meanwhile, al-Hashimi had returned to the country from Palestine and was tasked with inspecting al-Azma's troops. He concluded that the Arab Army was woefully unprepared and under-equipped for a serious confrontation against the French Army. In a meeting of King Faisal's war cabinet, al-'Azma was visibly upset with al-Hashimi's conclusions. Regardless, he ultimately conceded that the army was in a precarious situation when informed that the lack of ammunition meant that each soldier would only be allotted 270 bullets for their rifle and each artillery piece could only be allotted eight shells. Despite this, all of the officers in the meeting declared their willingness to fight. According to Provence, both al-Azma and al-Hashimi "complained bitterly that they faced an impossible task in organizing defense, made all the more difficult by Faisal's refusal to seriously contemplate and prepare for military confrontation". In the struggle against France, both officers sought to implement the model of Kemal's Anatolian insurgency while Faisal continued, in vain, to seek an intervention by his erstwhile British allies.

On 14 July, France issued an ultimatum to the Syrian government to disband its army and submit to French control. On 18 July, King Faisal and the Syrian cabinet met and all ministers except for al-Azma agreed not to enter into war with the French. After King Faisal ratified the cabinet's decision, al-Azma withdrew his troops from Anjar, the hills overlooking the Beqaa Valley from the east, and the Beirut-Damascus road. On 20 July, six hours prior to the ultimatum's deadline, King Faisal informed the French liaison in Damascus of his acceptance of Gouraud's terms. However, for unclear reasons, Faisal's notification did not reach Gouraud until 21 July. Sources suspicious of French intentions accused them of intentionally delaying delivery of the notice to give Gouraud a legitimate excuse for advancing on Damascus. However, there has been no evidence or indication of French sabotage. When news of Faisal's submission to the French and his disbandment of Arab Army barracks in Damascus reached the populace, outrage ensued. A riot by soldiers and residents angry at King Faisal's decision was violently put down by Emir Zeid, resulting in some 200 deaths. Al-Azma rejected demands to disband the army and implored King Faisal for an opportunity to confront French forces.

=== Battle of Maysalun and death ===
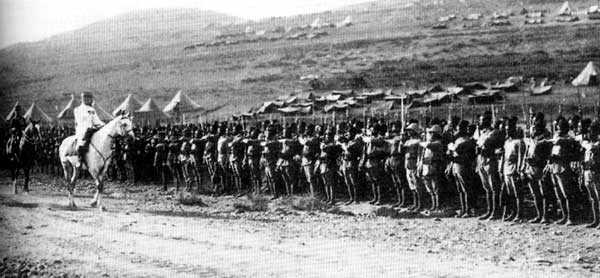
French General Henri Gouraud inspecting his troops at Maysalun

About 12,000 French troops consisting of ten infantry battalions as well as cavalrymen and artillerymen backed by tanks and fighter bombers, began their advance on Damascus on 21 July. They first captured Anjar in the Beqaa Valley, where General Hassan al-Hindi's brigade had disbanded without a fight. The French advance surprised King Faisal who believed that French military action would be avoided by his agreement to the 14 July ultimatum as General Gouraud had promised. In response to Gouraud's action, King Faisal agreed to al-Azma's request for mobilization. About 300 of Hindi's disbanded troops from Anjar were ordered to re-mobilize at the Maysalun Pass, some 12 miles to the west of Damascus. Al-Azma managed to assemble a few hundred regular troops, and around 1,000 volunteers, including Bedouin cavalry.

On 22 July, King Faisal attempted to delay the French advance by dispatching Minister of Education Sati al-Husri to negotiate with General Gouraud, who laid out new conditions to prevent his army's offensive and gave King Faisal one more day to deliberate on the terms. The next day, while the cabinet considered Gouraud's conditions, the French requested entry into Maysalun to access its water. The Syrians interpreted the request to be an excuse for Gouraud's army to enter Damascus without a fight and King Faisal ultimately rejected Gouraud's request and his new conditions. Afterward, al-Azma departed Damascus to confront Gouraud's army in what became known as the Battle of Maysalun.

Al-Azma's troops in Maysalun were mostly equipped with rusted rifles left by Ottoman troops and rifles used by Bedouin irregulars during the 1916 Arab Revolt as well as 15 cannons. The Arab force was composed of northern, central and southern columns with camel cavalry at the head. Al-Azma led the central column which was backed by numerous civilian volunteers. Around dawn, at the approaches of Maysalun, clashes between Arab forces and the French Army took place, but most Arab resistance, which was largely uncoordinated, had collapsed by the first hour of battle. The Syrians had used up the little ammunition they had and the militarily superior French Army broke the Arab lines.

Around 10:30am French forces reached al-Azma's headquarters. The mines that had been laid by the Syrians did not explode or at least did not seriously hinder the incoming French forces. With French troops about 100 meters away from him, al-Azma rushed to an artilleryman and commanded him to fire at the French tanks. Before any shell was fired, al-Azma was fatally shot in the head and chest by machine gun fire from a French tank crew. He was the only Arab officer to die in the battle. Sporadic clashes continued for another three hours. By then, Arab forces had retreated in disarray towards Damascus. The French Army entered the city on 25 July. In his memoirs, General Gouraud wrote that after their defeat the Syrian troops left "behind 15 cannons, 40 rifles, and a general ... named Yusuf Bey al-'Azma. He died a courageous soldier's death in battle."

== Legacy ==
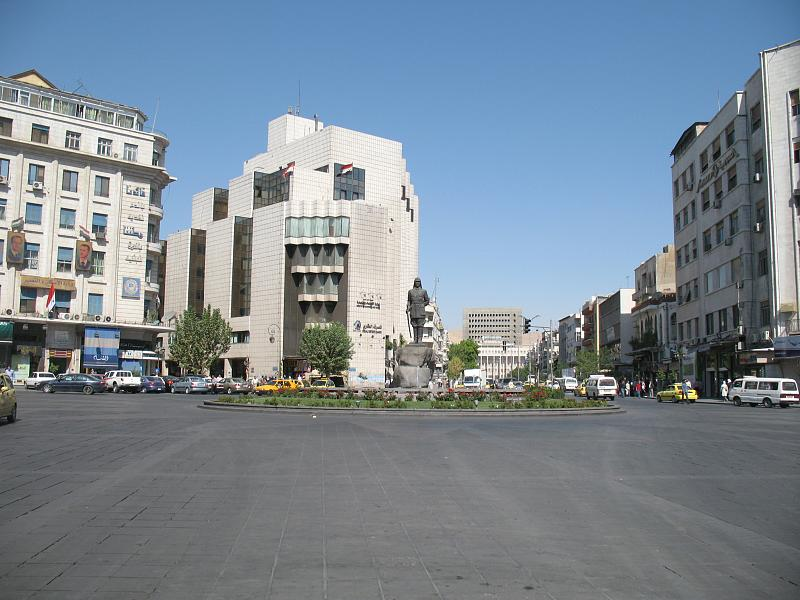
Yusuf al-Azma Square in central Damascus

Al-Azma's refusal to surrender to the French, his insistence on entering battle with inferior forces and his death commanding the Syrians in Maysalun made him a hero in Syria and the Arab world. According to Khoury, al-Azma was "henceforth immortalized by Syrians as the supreme national martyr". Likewise, Provence states that al-Azma "became the supreme symbol of interwar Syrian Arab patriotism". His statue stands in a major square named after him in central Damascus, with streets and schools named in his honor throughout Syria. Statues of al-Azma are also present across the Middle East. According to historian Tareq Y. Ismael, the defeat of al-Azma and the subsequent French takeover of Syria contributed to popular attitudes in the Arab world—that exist to the present day—which hold that "the West is not honorable in its commitments, speaks with a forked tongue about issues of democracy ... and will oppress anyone who stands in the way of its imperial designs".

A tomb for al-Azma was erected inside a shaded grove at Maysalun in the 1930s. Though it has been frequently renovated, the original structure of the tomb remains largely intact. It consists of a stone sarcophagus elevated on a platform. One side of the platform has a stairway and the other side is a concrete column which carries a large concrete roof that is further supported by a beam. The sarcophagus has a triangular roof upon which is engraved the Zulfiqar sword. The Syrian military annually honors al-Azma at his tomb on Maysalun Day.

== See also ==
- Great Syrian Revolt
- Ayyash Al-Haj
- Fawzi al-Qawuqji
- Abd al-Rahman Shahbandar
- Sultan al-Atrash
- Adham Khanjar
- Saleh Al-Ali
- Hasan al-Kharrat

== Bibliography ==
- Allawi, Ali A. (2014). Faisal I of Iraq. Yale University Press. ISBN 9780300127324.
- Herb, Guntram H. (2008). Nations and Nationalism: A Global Historical Overview. ABC-CLIO. ISBN 9781851099085.
- Ismael, Tareq Y. (2013). The International Relations of the Contemporary Middle East: Subordination and Beyond. Routledge. ISBN 9781135006914.
- Khoury, Philip S. (1987). Syria and the French Mandate: The Politics of Arab Nationalism, 1920–1945. Princeton University Press. ISBN 9781400858392.
- Moubayed, Sami (2006). Steel and Silk. Cune Press. ISBN 1885942419.
- Provence, Michael (2011). "Ottoman Modernity, Colonialism, and Insurgency in the Interwar Arab East" (PDF). International Journal of Middle East Studies. 43 (2). Cambridge University Press: 205–225. doi:10.1017/S0020743811000031. S2CID 161694886. Archived (PDF) from the original on 2022-02-25.
- Roded, Ruth (November 1983). "Ottoman Service as a Vehicle for the Rise of New Upstarts among the Urban Elite Families of Syria in the Last Decades of Ottoman Rule". Asian and African Studies. 17 (1–3). Haifa: Institute of Middle Eastern Studies: 63–94. ISSN 0066-8281.
- Roded, Ruth (1986). "Social Patterns Among the Urban Elite". In Kushner, David (ed.). Palestine in the Late Ottoman Period: Political, Social, and Economic Transformation. BRILL. ISBN 9789004077928.
- Tauber, Eliezer (2013). The Formation of Modern Iraq and Syria. Routledge. ISBN 9781135201180.
- Wien, Peter (2017). Arab Nationalism: The Politics of History and Culture in the Modern Middle East. Abingdon: Routledge. ISBN 978-0-415-49937-8.
