= 1920 capture of Damascus =

Military action during the Franco-Syrian war in 1920

- Part of the Franco-Syrian War
Date	24 July 1920
Location	Damascus, Arab Kingdom of Syria
Result	French victory: End of the Franco-Syrian War; Arab Kingdom of Syria disestablished

Belligerents
(French Third Republic) France	Syrian rebels

Commanders and leaders
(French Third Republic) Henri Gouraud	Faisal I

Casualties and losses
- Minimal casualties

The 1920 capture of Damascus was the final stage of the Franco-Syrian War in which French forces captured Damascus with little resistance. The Arab Kingdom of Syria was brought to an end, and the French mandate of Syria was put into effect. Shortly afterward, in September 1920, Damascus was established as the capital of the State of Damascus under a French mandate.

The war of the Hashemites against the French, which erupted in January 1920, shortly became a devastating campaign for the newly-proclaimed Arab Kingdom of Syria. Worried about the results of a long bloody fight with the French, King Faisal himself surrendered on 14 July 1920, but his message would not reach War minister Yusuf al-'Azma, who, ignoring the King, led an army to Maysalun to defend Syria from the French advance. The Battle of Maysalun resulted in a crushing Syrian defeat. The French troops later marched on Damascus and captured it on 24 July 1920.

The French troops met little resistance from the inhabitants of Damascus, but there were shootouts between the French and residents of the Shaghour and Midan neighborhoods at the outset of the French entry. A Pro-French government under the leadership of Aladdin al-Droubi was installed the next day.
