= Muhammad al-Ashmar =

Syrian-Palestinian rebel and politician

- محمد الأشمر
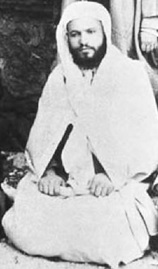
- Al-Ashmar in al-Midan, 1925
- Born: 1892; Damascus, Ottoman Empire
- Died: 3 March 1960 (aged 67–68); Damascus, United Arab Republic
- Military career
- Allegiance: Ottoman Empire (1917–1918); Arab Kingdom of Syria (1919–1920) (Kingdom of Hejaz) Syrian rebels (1925–1927) (Kingdom of Hejaz) Arab Higher Committee (1936–1937)
- Conflicts: World War I; Palestine campaign; Franco-Syrian War; Battle of Maysalun; Great Syrian Revolt; Arab revolt in Palestine

Muhammad al-Ashmar (Arabic: محمد الأشمر) (1892 – 3 March 1960) was a Syrian rebel commander during the Great Syrian Revolt and the 1936–1939 Arab revolt in Palestine, and a prominent communist figure in post-independence Syria.

== Early life and career ==
Al-Ashmar was born in the al-Midan quarter of Damascus in 1892 during the Ottoman era. He served in the Ottoman Army during World War I. He spent much of his early life studying Islamic theology. France gained control of Syria in 1918, establishing a mandate over the country in 1920. By then, al-Ashmar became a prominent Muslim sheikh based in al-Midan. Al-Ashmar gathered about 40-50 of his men from al-Midan to form part of the civilian volunteer units backing the Syrian forces against the invading French Army at the Battle of Maysalun on 24 July. According to Sami Moubayed, al-Ashmar joined Ibrahim Hananu's militia based in the region of Aleppo.

Al-Ashmar was arrested in 1922 for his earlier participation in the countrywide rebellions and exiled to the southern Hauran region. He managed to return to northern Syria to partake in anti-French activities in the Syrian Coastal Mountains. He was exiled to Amman in Transjordan in 1923.

== Role in Great Syrian Revolt ==
Al-Ashmar played a leading role as a commander during the Great Syrian Revolt against French rule between 1925 and 1927. He was also an early liaison between the main leader of the revolt, Sultan Pasha al-Atrash, and the notables of Damascus. He was a part of the first Damascene delegation to al-Atrash, who was based in the Hauran region, along with Nasib al-Bakri and Yahya al-Hayati. Al-Ashmar and al-Atrash were supporters of the Hashemites, who had led the Arab Revolt in 1916, ruled Syria until 1918, and were the nominal leaders of Transjordan and Iraq at the time of the 1925 revolt. Al-Atrash designated al-Ashmar as a field commander of the revolt.

On 17 October 1925, al-Ashmar, along with commander Hasan al-Kharrat, led a rebel assault against the French military in Damascus. His forces set government buildings alight and took over the Azm Palace where the French High-Commissioner, Maurice Sarrail, resided, although he was not present during the assault, which left 180 French military personnel dead. Sarrail subsequently ordered a massive aerial bombardment of the city, resulting in the deaths of 1,500 people. Later that year, al-Ashmar went into exile in Transjordan to escape an arrest warrant for his alleged responsibility in the killing of five French officers. When the French Mandatory government requested that the British authorities in Transjordan arrest al-Ashmar, the British refused, citing his status as a political refugee. He returned to Syria after a general amnesty in 1932.

== Role in Palestine revolt ==
In August 1936, al-Ashmar became the second-in-command to Fawzi al-Qawuqji of an Arab volunteer force that arrived in northern Palestine to aid local peasant rebels in the Palestinian Arab revolt against British rule. He commanded the Arab volunteer force's Syrian battalion between August and October 1936. He returned to Syria in late 1936 after a truce was reached. His was celebrated by the residents of Damascus when he arrived in the city. The British requested the French to arrest al-Ashmar for his role in the revolt, but they refused, claiming that the arrest of a popular public figure like al-Ashmar would provoke unrest in Syria.

Hostilities resumed in late 1937 after Palestinian Arab objections to the recommendations of the Peel Commission, which called for Palestine's partition into Jewish and Arab states. The newly established, Damascus-based Central Committee of National Jihad in Palestine of exiled Palestinian figures under Hajj Amin al-Husseini's leadership requested that al-Ashmar, along with al-Qawuqji, lead rebel forces in Palestine in November 1937, but this effort was unsuccessful. Al-Ashmar still maintained involvement with the revolt from Damascus and issued fatwas sought by Palestinian rebel commanders, often Yusuf Abu Durra and Farhan al-Sa'di, for the assassination of specific local Palestinian leaders who they suspected of collaborating with the authorities.

== Politics in Syria ==
Upon his return to Syria, al-Ashmar agitated for the establishment of a state governed by Islamic law and free of Western influence. He became a strong supporter of the National Bloc leader Abd al-Rahman Shahbandar. He lent his support to Shukri al-Quwatli in the 1943 presidential elections because of the latter's promise to allow Muslim activist organizations more political freedom in return for al-Ashmar's help in gaining votes from the al-Midan quarter. Quwatli won the elections, but abandoned his promises to the Muslim activist groups, angering al-Ashmar and conservative activists throughout the country. They formed movements aimed at removing Quwatli from power and opposing his social liberalism, particularly his permission for cinemas and cabarets to open in the country.

Al-Ashmar became a popular figure in Syria for his participation in the Syrian and Palestinian anti-colonial revolts. On 19 May 1944, he addressed a crowd of hundreds of conservative Syrian Muslims at the Tankiz Mosque in Marjeh Square, Damascus, strongly condemning the increasing prevalence of unveiled women, cinema and the city's hosting of a charity banquet at the French Officers' Club sponsored by the French-Christian "Drop of Milk" society and the wife of then-education minister, Nasuhi al-Bukhari. The speech inspired the crowd to demonstrate against the banquet, with the demonstrations descending into riots. Clashes between demonstrators and the police resulted in the deaths of two protesters, including a 12-year-old boy, in the al-Salihiyah quarter. Al-Ashmar was arrested and sent to the Tadmor Prison in the desert city of Palmyra the following day. The protests subsequently spread to other parts of Damascus, and also Aleppo and Homs, with participants calling for al-Ashmar's release. President Quwatli had al-Ashmar released days later in response to the uproar. Months later, al-Ashmar strongly condemned the Quwatli administration's participation in a women's suffrage conference in Cairo, Egypt in December 1944.

Following Syria's independence in 1946, al-Ashmar became a supporter of the Syrian Communist Party. His backing was a major factor in the party's good performance in al-Midan during the 1954 parliamentary elections. He headed the communist Syrian Partisans of Peace and was a member of the World Peace Council. Al-Ashmar was awarded the Stalin Peace Prize by the Soviet Union in March 1956. He largely retired from politics around this time and died in Damascus in 1960.

== Bibliography ==
- Atiyeh, George Nicholas (1988). Arab Civilization: Challenges and Responses. New York City: State University of New York Press. ISBN 978-0-7914-9541-4.
- Barr, James (2012). A Line in the Sand: The Anglo-French Struggle for the Middle East, 1914–1948. W. W. Norton & Company. ISBN 9780393070651.
- Gelvin, James L. (1998). Divided Loyalties: Nationalism and Mass Politics in Syria at the Close of Empire. California University Press. ISBN 9780520919839.
- Ginat, Rami (2010). Syria and the Doctrine of Arab Neutralism: From Independence to Dependence. Sussex Academic Press. ISBN 9781845193966.
- Frisch, Hillel (2012). The Palestinian Military: Between Militias and Armies. W. W. Norton & Company. ISBN 9780393070651.
- Kedourie, Elie (2015). Zionism and Arabism in Palestine and Israel. Routledge. ISBN 9781317442738.
- Moubayed, Sami M. (2006). Steel & Silk: Men & Women Who Shaped Syria 1900–2000. Cune Press. ISBN 1-885942-41-9.
- Parsons, Laila (2015). "Rebels Without Borders: Southern Syria and Palestine, 1919-1936". In Cyrus Schayegh (ed.). The Routledge Handbook of the History of the Middle East Mandates. Routledge. ISBN 9781317497066.
- Pierret, Thomas (2013). Religion and State in Syria: The Sunni Ulama from Coup to Revolution. Cambridge University Press. ISBN 9781107026414.
- Provence, Michael (2005). The Great Syrian Revolt and the Rise of Arab Nationalism. University of Texas Press. ISBN 9780292706804.
- Thomas, Martin (2008). Empires of Intelligence: Security Services and Colonial Disorder After 1914. University of California Press. ISBN 978-0520933743.
- Thompson, Elizabeth (2013). Colonial Citizens: Republican Rights, Paternal Privilege, and Gender in French Syria and Lebanon. Columbia University Press. ISBN 9780231505154.
