= Battle of Maysalun =

1920 battle of the Franco-Syrian War

Coordinates: 33°35′44″N 36°3′53″E

- Part of the Franco-Syrian War
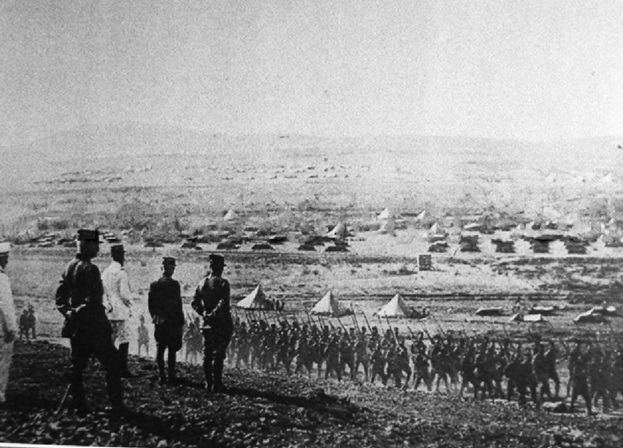
- French general Henri Gouraud inspecting his troops in the Anti-Lebanon Mountains the day before the Battle of Maysalun
Date	24 July 1920 (06:30-10:30; with intermittent clashes until 13:30)
Location	Khan Maysalun and Wadi al-Qarn, Anti-Lebanon Mountains, Syria
Result	French victory

Belligerents
(French Third Republic) France: Lebanon	Syria

Commanders and leaders
(French Third Republic) Henri Gouraud (French Third Republic) Mariano Goybet	Faisal I Yusuf al-Azma †; Militia commanders: Muhammad al-Ashmar; Yasin Kiwan †

Strength
12,000 troops (backed by tanks and aircraft)	1,400–4,000 regulars Bedouin cavalrymen civilian volunteers

Casualties and losses
42 killed 152 wounded 14 missing (French claim)	~150 killed ~1,500 wounded (French claim)

The Battle of Maysalun (Arabic: معركة ميسلون), also known as the Battle of Maysalun Pass or the Battle of Khan Maysalun (French: Bataille de Khan Mayssaloun), was a four-hour battle fought between the forces of the Arab Kingdom of Syria and the French Army of the Levant on 24 July 1920 near Maysalun in the Anti-Lebanon Mountains, about 25 kilometres (16 mi) west of Damascus.

In October 1918, Arab rebels, under Hashemite Emir Faisal, captured Damascus during the British-backed Arab Revolt against the Ottoman Empire. Faisal then formed a government under the auspices of the Allied military occupation administration of "OETA East", consistent with an earlier Anglo-French agreement. The French encountered local revolts when their forces entered the country, and in March 1920, Faisal was proclaimed King of Syria. A month later, the League of Nations allocated Syria to France as a mandate.

The Battle of Maysalun ensued as French forces set out from Lebanon to assert control over Damascus and topple Faisal's government. With remnants of the Syrian army and local volunteers, Faisal's war minister, General Yusuf al-Azma, set out to confront them. The better-equipped French troops, led by General Mariano Goybet, defeated al-Azma, who was killed in action. The French entered Damascus the following day, encountering little resistance. Soon afterward, Faisal was expelled from Syria. Despite the Syrian army's decisive defeat, the battle is viewed in Syria and the rest of the Arab world as a symbol of courageous resistance against a stronger, imperial power.

== Background ==
On 30 October 1918, towards the end of World War I, the Sharifian Army led by Emir Faisal, backed by the British Army, captured Damascus from the Ottomans as part of the Arab Revolt against the Ottoman Empire. The war ended less than a month after the Sharifian–British conquest of Damascus. In correspondences between the Sharifian leadership in Mecca and Henry McMahon, the British high commissioner in Cairo, the latter promised to support the establishment of a Sharifian kingdom in the Arab provinces of the Ottoman Empire in return for launching a revolt against the Ottomans. However, the British and French governments secretly made previous arrangements regarding the division of the Ottomans' Arab provinces between themselves in the 1916 Sykes-Picot Agreement.

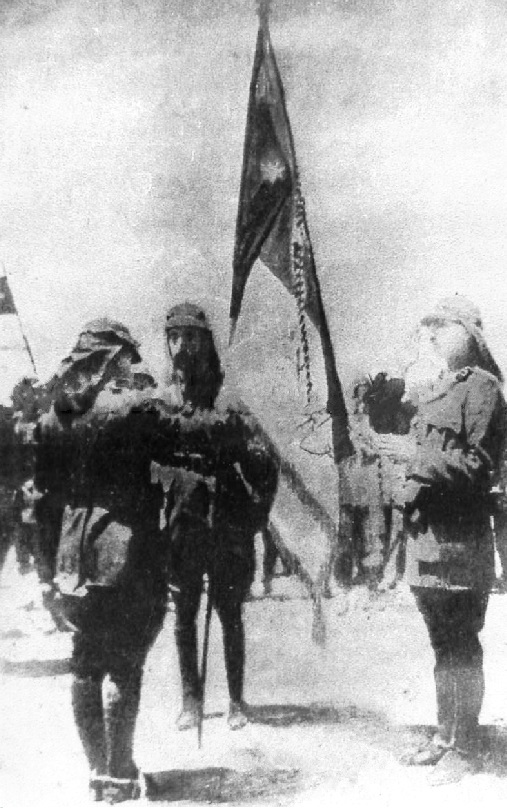
King Faisal (center) and War Minister Yusuf al-Azma (left, in front of Faisal), 1920

To ensure his throne in Syria, Faisal attended the January 1919 Paris Conference, where he was not recognized by the French government as the sovereign ruler of Syria; Faisal called for Syrian sovereignty under his rule, but the European powers attending the conference called for European mandates to be established over the former Arab territories of the Ottoman Empire. In the US-led June 1919 King–Crane Commission, which published its conclusions in 1922, the commission determined that the people of Syria overwhelmingly rejected French rule. Furthermore, Emir Faisal stated to the commission that "French rule would mean certain death to Syrians as a distinguished people".

French forces commanded by General Henri Gouraud landed in Beirut on 18 November 1919, with the ultimate goal of bringing all of Syria under French control. Shortly thereafter, French forces deployed to the Beqaa Valley between Beirut and Damascus. Against King Faisal's wishes, his delegate to General Gouraud, Nuri al-Said, agreed to the French deployment and the disbandment of Arab troops from al-Mu'allaqa, near Zahle. The agreement between al-Said and Gouraud was contrary to an earlier agreement Faisal had made with French Prime Minister Georges Clemenceau, which held that French troops would not deploy in the Beqaa Valley until the League of Nations ruled on the matter. Faisal condemned al-Said and accused of him of treachery. Following the Arab Army withdrawal from al-Mu'allaqa, Christian militiamen from Zahle raided the town, prompting attacks from local Muslim militiamen, which forced several Christian families to the coast. Amid these developments, armed groups of rebels and bandits emerged throughout the Beqaa Valley. When a French officer in Baalbek was assaulted by Shia Muslim rebels opposed to the French presence, Gouraud held the Arab government responsible and demanded that it apologize, which it did not. In response, Gouraud violated his agreement with al-Said and occupied Baalbek. The French deployment along the Syrian coast and the Beqaa Valley provoked unrest throughout Syria and sharpened political divisions between the political camp calling for confronting the French and the camp preferring compromise.

On 8 March 1920, the Syrian National Congress proclaimed the establishment of the Kingdom of Syria, with Faisal as king. This unilateral action was immediately rejected by the British and French. In the San Remo Conference, which was called by the Allied Powers in April 1920, the allocation of mandates in the Arab territories was finalized, with France given a mandate over Syria. France's allocation of Syria was, in turn, repudiated by Faisal and the Syrian National Congress. After months of instability and failure to make good on the promises Faisal had made to the French, General Gouraud gave an ultimatum to Faisal on 14 July 1920 demanding that he disband the Arab Army and submit to French authority by 20 July or face a French military invasion. On 18 July, Faisal and the entire cabinet, with the exception of War Minister Yusuf al-Azma, agreed to the ultimatum and issued disbandment orders for the Arab Army units at Anjar, the Beirut–Damascus road and the hills of the Anti-Lebanon Mountains overlooking the Beqaa Valley. Two days later, Faisal informed the French liaison in Damascus of his acceptance of the ultimatum, but for unclear reasons, Faisal's notification did not reach Gouraud until 21 July. Sources suspicious of French intentions accused the French of intentionally delaying delivery of the notice to give Gouraud an official excuse for advancing on Damascus. However, there has been no evidence or indication of French sabotage. News of the disbandment and Faisal's submission led to riots in Damascus on 20 July and their suppression by Emir Zeid, which led to around 200 deaths. Al-Azma, who staunchly opposed surrender, implored Faisal to allow him and the remnants of his army to confront the French.

=== Prelude ===
On 22 July, Faisal dispatched Education Minister Sati al-Husri and the Arab government's former Beirut representative, Jamil al-Ulshi, to meet Gouraud at his headquarters in Aley and persuade him to end his army's advance to Damascus. Gouraud responded by extending the ultimatum by one day and with new, more stringent conditions, namely that France be allowed to establish a mission in Damascus to supervise the implementation of the original ultimatum and the establishment of the French mandate. Al-Husri returned to Damascus the same day to communicate Gouraud's message to Faisal, who called for a meeting of the cabinet on 23 July to consider the new ultimatum. Colonel Cousse, a French liaison officer to Damascus, interrupted the meeting with a demand from Gouraud that the French army be allowed to advance toward Maysalun, where water wells were abundant. Gouraud had originally planned to launch the offensive against Damascus from Ayn al-Judaydah, a spring in the Anti-Lebanon Range, but the lack of water sources there amid the steep, barren mountains led to a change of plans. Accordingly, Gouraud sought to occupy Khan Maysalun, an isolated caravanserai on the Beirut–Damascus road situated at the crest of the Wadi al-Qarn mountain pass in the Anti-Lebanon, located 25 kilometers (16 mi) west of Damascus. Gouraud was also motivated to occupy Khan Maysalun because of its proximity to the Hejaz Railway.

Cousse's message confirmed the fears of Faisal's cabinet that Gouraud was intent on taking over Syria by force. The cabinet subsequently rejected Gouraud's ultimatum and issued a largely symbolic appeal to the international community to end the French advance. On 23 July, al-Azma set out from Damascus with his motley force of army regulars and volunteers, which was divided into northern, central and southern columns each headed by camel cavalry units. French forces launched their offensive towards Khan Maysalun and Wadi al-Qarn shortly after dawn on 24 July, at 5:00, while Syrian forces were waiting at their positions overlooking the low end of Wadi al-Qarn.

== Combatants and arms ==
=== French forces ===
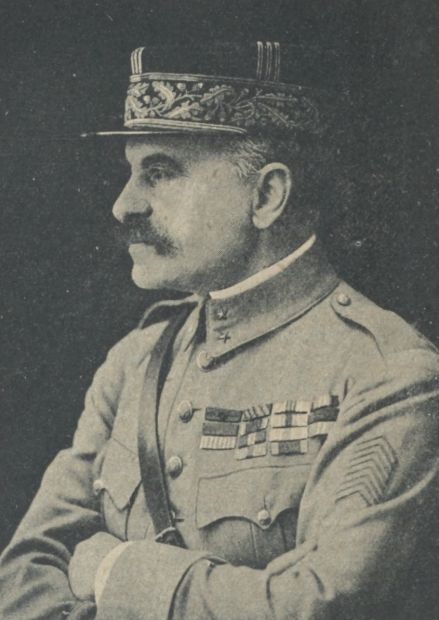
General Mariano Goybet commanded French forces during the battle

Estimates of the combined size of the French Army of the Levant forces that participated in the battle ranged from 9,000 to 12,000 troops. The troops involved were mostly Senegalese and Algerian, and consisted of ten infantry battalions and a number of cavalry and artillery units. Among the participating units were the 415th Infantry Regiment, the 2nd Algerian Tirailleurs (Riflemen) Regiment, the Senegalese Division, the African Light Infantry Regiment and the Moroccan Spahi Regiment. A number of Maronite volunteers from Mount Lebanon reportedly joined the French forces as well. The Army of the Levant was equipped with field and mountain artillery batteries and 155mm guns, and backed by tanks and fighter bombers. The commander of the French forces was General Mariano Goybet.

=== Syrian forces ===
Syrian forces consisted of remnants of the Arab Army assembled by General al-Azma, including soldiers from General Hassan al-Hindi's disbanded Anjar-based garrison, disbanded units from Damascus and Bedouin camel cavalry; most Arab Army units had been disbanded days prior to the battle by order of King Faisal as part of his acceptance of General Gouraud's terms. In addition to Arab Army troops, numerous civilian volunteers and militiamen from Damascus joined al-Azma's forces. Estimates put the number of Syrian soldiers and irregulars at around 4,000, while historian Eliezer Tauber asserts that al-Azma recruited 3,000 soldiers and volunteers, of whom only 1,400 participated in the battle. According to historian Michael Provence, the "quarters of Damascus had been emptied of young men as crowds walked west, some armed only with swords or sticks, to meet the mechanized French column".

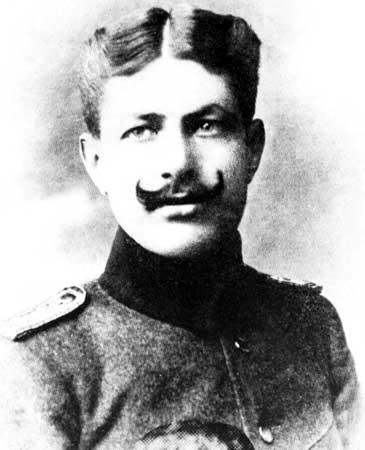
Commander of the Syrian forces at Maysalun, War Minister Yusuf al-Azma died during the battle.

Part of the civilian militia units were assembled and led by Yasin Kiwan, a Damascene merchant, Abd al-Qadir Kiwan, the former imam of the Umayyad Mosque, and Shaykh Hamdi al-Juwajani, a Muslim scholar. Yasin and Abd al-Qadir were killed during the battle. Shaykh Muhammad al-Ashmar also participated in the battle with 40–50 of his men from the Midan quarter of Damascus. Other Muslim preachers and scholars from Damascus, including Tawfiq al-Darra (ex-mufti of the Ottoman Fifth Army), Sa'id al-Barhani (preacher at the Tuba Mosque), Muhammad al-Fahl (scholar from the Qalbaqjiyya Madrasa) and Ali Daqqar (preacher at the Sinan Pasha Mosque) also participated in the battle.

The Syrians were equipped with rifles discarded by retreating Ottoman soldiers during World War I and those used by the Sharifian Army's Bedouin cavalry during the 1916 Arab Revolt. The Syrians also possessed a number of machine guns and about 15 artillery pieces. According to various versions, ammunition was low, with 120–250 bullets per rifle, 45 bullets per machine gun, and 50–80 shells per cannon. Part of this ammunition was also unusable because many bullet and rifle types did not correspond to each other.

== Battle ==
The first clashes took place at 6:30 when French tanks stormed the central position of the Syrian defensive line while French cavalry and infantry units assaulted the Syrians' northern and southern positions. The camel cavalry were the first Syrian units to engage the French. Syrian forces initially put up stiff resistance along the front, but lacked coordination between their different units. Early in the clashes, Syrian artillery fire inflicted casualties on a battery of French soldiers. French tanks faced heavy fire as they attempted to gain ground against the Syrians. However, French artillery took a toll on Syrian forces and by 8:30 the French had broken the Syrians' central trench. At one point in the first few hours of the clashes, Syrian forces managed to briefly pin down two Senegalese companies that were relatively isolated on the French right flank. The losses inflicted on the two Senegalese units represented roughly half of the French army's total casualties. Nonetheless, by 10:00, the battle was effectively over, having turned decisively in favor of the French.

At 10:30, French forces reached al-Azma's headquarters, unhindered by the mines laid en route by the Syrians. Little information is known about the battle from the Syrian side. According to one version, when French forces were about 100 meters in the distance, al-Azma rushed to a Syrian artilleryman stationed near him and ordered him to open fire. However, before any shells could be fired, a French tank unit spotted al-Azma and gunned him down by machine gun. In another account, al-Azma had attempted to mine the trenches as the French forces approached his position, but was shot down by the French before he could set off the charges. Al-Azma's death marked the end of the battle, although intermittent clashes continued until 13:30. Surviving Syrian fighters were bombed from the air and harried by the French as they retreated toward Damascus.

After the battle, General Gouraud addressed General Goybet as follows:

GENERAL ORDER No. 22

Aley, 24 July 1920

"The General is deeply happy to address his congratulations to General Goybet and his valiant troops: 415th of line, 2nd Algerian sharpshooters, 11th and 10th Senegalese sharpshooters, light-infantry-men of Africa, Moroccan trooper regiment, batteries of African groups, batteries of 155, 314, company of tanks, bombardment groups and squadrons who in the hard fight of 24 of July, have broken the resistance of the enemy who defied us for 8 months ... They have engraved a glorious page in the history of our country." – General Gouraud

== Aftermath ==
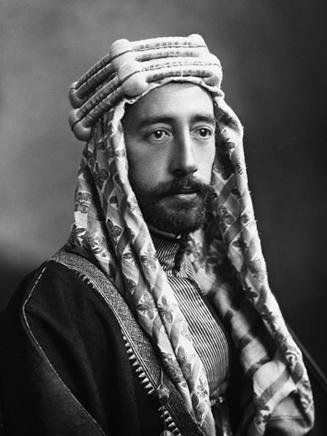
King Faisal was expelled from Syria by the French following their occupation of Damascus

Initial estimates of the casualties which claimed 2,000 Syrian dead and 800 French casualties turned out to be exaggerated. The French Army claimed 42 of its soldiers were killed, 152 wounded and 14 missing in action, while around 150 Syrian fighters were killed and 1,500 wounded. King Faisal observed the battle unfold from the village of al-Hamah, and as it became apparent that the Syrians had been routed, he and his cabinet, with the exception of Interior Minister Ala al-Din al-Durubi, who had quietly secured a deal with the French, departed for al-Kiswah, a town located at the southern approaches of Damascus.

French forces had captured Aleppo on 23 July without a fight, and after their victory at Maysalun, French troops besieged and captured Damascus on 25 July. Within a short time, the majority of Faisal's forces fled or surrendered to the French, although parties of Arab groups opposed to French rule continued to resist before being quickly defeated. King Faisal returned to Damascus on 25 July and asked al-Durubi to form a government, although al-Durubi had already decided on the composition of his cabinet, which was confirmed by the French. General Gouraud condemned Faisal's rule in Syria, accusing him of having "dragged the country to within an inch of destruction", and stating that because of this, it was "utterly impossible for him to remain in the country". Faisal denounced Gouraud's statement and insisted that he remained the sovereign head of Syria whose authority he was "granted by the Syrian people".

Although he verbally dismissed the French order expelling him and his family from Syria, Faisal departed Damascus on 27 July with only one of his cabinet members, al-Husri. He initially traveled south to Daraa in the Hauran region where he gained the allegiance of local tribal leaders. However, a French ultimatum to the tribal leaders to expel Faisal or face the bombardment of their encampments compelled Faisal to head west to Haifa in British-held Palestine on 1 August and avoid further bloodshed. Faisal's departure from Syria marked an end to his goal of establishing and leading an Arab state in Syria.

== Legacy ==
The French took control of the territory that became the French Mandate for Syria and the Lebanon. France divided Syria into smaller statelets centered on certain regions and sects, including Greater Lebanon for the Maronites, Jabal al-Druze State for the Druze in Hauran, the Alawite State for the Alawites in the Syrian coastal mountains and the states of Damascus and Aleppo. Gouraud reportedly went to the tomb of Saladin, kicked it, and said:

Awake, Saladin. We have returned. My presence here consecrates the victory of the Cross over the Crescent.

Although the Syrians were decisively defeated, the Battle of Maysalun "has gone down in Arab history as a synonym for heroism and hopeless courage against huge odds, as well as for treachery and betrayal", according to Iraqi historian Ali al-Allawi. According to British journalist Robert Fisk, the Battle of Maysalun was "a struggle which every Syrian learns at school but about which almost every Westerner is ignorant". Historian Tareq Y. Ismael wrote that following the battle, the "Syrian resistance at Khan Maysalun soon took on epic proportions. It was viewed as an Arab attempt to stop the imperial avalanche." He also states that the Syrians' defeat caused popular attitudes in the Arab world that exist until the present day which hold that the Western world dishonors the commitments it makes to the Arab people and "oppresses anyone who stands in the way of its imperial designs." Sati' al-Husri, a major pan-Arabist thinker, asserted that the battle was "one of the most important events in the modern history of the Arab nation." The event is annually commemorated by Syrians, during which thousands visit the grave of al-Azma in Maysalun.

== Bibliography ==
- Allawi, Ali A. (2014). Faisal I of Iraq. Yale University Press. ISBN 9780300127324.
- Baker, Randall (1979). King Husain and the Kingdom of Hejaz. The Oleander Press. ISBN 9780900891489.
- Fisk, Robert (2007). The Great War for Civilisation: The Conquest of the Middle East. Knopf Doubleday Publishing Group. ISBN 9780307428714.
- Gelvin, James L. (1998). Divided Loyalties: Nationalism and Mass Politics in Syria at the Close of Empire. California University Press. ISBN 9780520919839.
- Husri, Sati' (1966). The Day of Maysalūn: A Page from the Modern History of the Arabs. Middle East Institute. ISBN 9780916808068.
- Ismael, Tareq Y. (2014). The International Relations of the Contemporary Middle East: Subordination and Beyond. Routledge. ISBN 9781135006914.
- Khoury, Philip S. (1987). Syria and the French Mandate: The Politics of Arab Nationalism, 1920-1945. Princeton University Press. ISBN 9781400858392.
- McHugo, John (2013). A Concise History of the Arabs. The New Press. ISBN 9781595589460.
- Moubayed, Sami (2006). Steel and Silk. Cune Press. ISBN 1885942419.
- Provence, Michael (2011). "Ottoman Modernity, Colonialism, and Insurgency in the Interwar Arab East" (PDF). International Journal of Middle East Studies. 43 (2). Cambridge University Press: 205–225. doi:10.1017/S0020743811000031. S2CID 161694886.
- Russell, Malcolm B. (1985). The first Modern Arab State: Syria Under Faysal, 1918-1920. Bibliotheca Islamica. ISBN 9780882970301.
- Sorek, Tamir (2015). Palestinian Commemoration in Israel: Calendars, Monuments, and Martyrs. Stanford University Press. ISBN 9780804795180.
- Tauber, Eliezer (1995). The Formation of Modern Iraq and Syria. Routledge. ISBN 9781135201180.
