= Yusuf al-Azma Square =

Square in Damascus, Syria

- City square
- {{{other_names}}}
- ساحة يوسف العظمة
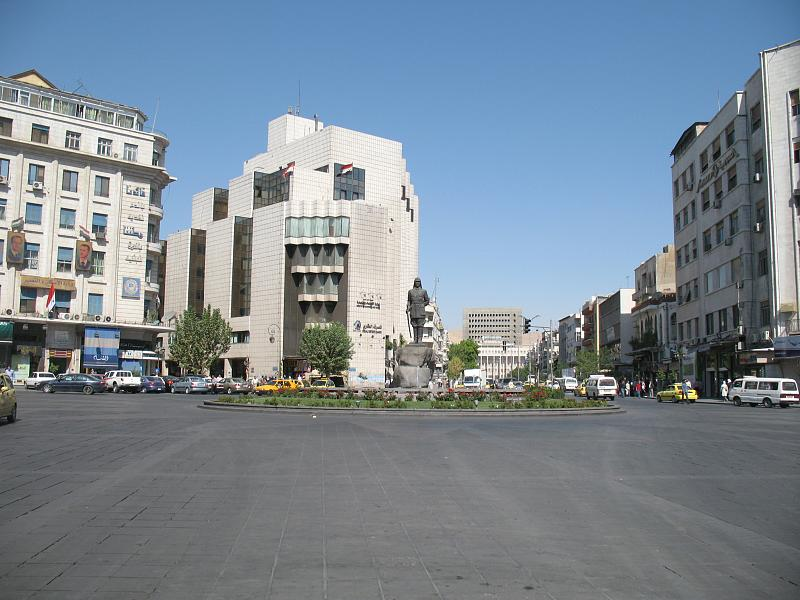
- Yusuf al-Azma Square in October 2008
- Opened: 1947
- Owner: City of Damascus
- Location: Al-Jabiri Street, Damascus, Syria
- Interactive map of Yusuf al-Azma Square
- Coordinates: 33°30′58.75″N 36°17′42.5″E

Yusuf al-Azma Square (Arabic: ساحة يوسف العظمة / ALA-LC: sāḥat Yūsuf al-‘Aẓmah), also called al-Muhafaza Square, is a city square in central Damascus, Syria. Named after Yusuf al-Azma, the square serves as the headquarters of the Damascus municipality government, alongside other official and commercial buildings, including Cham Palace Hotel.

In 2007, the square was rehabilitated by paving it with black basalt stone, planting medians with flowers, bitter orange trees on all roads leading to it, paving the square with lime stone, and changing the system of water fountains.

== See also ==
- Damascus
- Yusuf Al-Azmah
- Battle of Maysalun
