= Samakh raid (1920) =

- Part of the Franco-Syrian War
| Date | April 1920 |
| Location | Samakh, Occupied Enemy Territory Administration-South (soon to become Mandatory Palestine) |
| Result | Syrian victory: Capture of Samakh |

Belligerents
| Haganah (likely): United Kingdom; Royal Air Force | Arab Kingdom of Syria; Bedouin militias |

Commanders and leaders
| Leib Ehrlich † | Kayed al-Ubaydat (executed) |

Strength
| 42 | 50 |

Casualties and losses
| 42 killed | "Number of casualties" |

The Samakh raid was a successful Arab raid on Samakh village.

== Background ==
The Franco-Syrian War took place in early 1920 between Syrian Arab nationalists, under the Hashemite King, and France. Gangs ('isabat) of clan-based border peasants, combining politics and banditry, were active in the area of the loosely defined border between the soon to be established Mandatory Palestine, French Mandate of Lebanon and Syria.

== Timeline ==
At the beginning of the Franco-Syrian War, the Upper Galilee was populated by several semi-nomadic Bedouin Arab tribes, the largest residing in Halasa, and four tiny Jewish settlements, including Metula, Kfar Giladi, Tel Hai and Hamra. While the Arab villages and Bedouin allied with the Arab Kingdom of Syria, the Jewish residents chose to remain neutral during the Arab conflict with the French. Early in the war, a Kfar Giladi resident was killed by armed Bedouin, greatly increasing tension in the region. Jewish villages were regularly pillaged by the pro-Syrian Bedouin on the pretext of searching for French spies and soldiers.

=== British–Arab Clash at Samakh ===
In April 1920, the Arab militants engaged the British Army at Samakh and suffered a number of casualties as RAF planes strafed them on their way back across the Jordan. Kayed al-Ubaydat, the paramount shaykh of the nahiyah (the lowest level of the Ottoman provincial hierarchy) was among the dead. The event took place as some 2,000 armed Bedouins mostly from Transjordan attempted to attack the Samakh train station aiming to prevent the arrival of British reinforcements from Haifa.

=== Samakh Raid ===
Despite the Jewish militia's efforts to hold the police fortress at the town's exit, it fell the next day into Syrian hands, along with the 42 defenders who were all killed. Following an unsuccessful Jewish counterattack that resulted in heavy losses, the Syrians managed to hold their ground. These achievements, attributed mainly to their artillery and armor capabilities, left the Jewish unsure how to respond with their light weapons. The surprise night assault led to the abandonment of Masada and Sha’ar HaGolan, with settlers fleeing west and south toward Kibbutz Degania. These settlements were not prepared materially or militarily for battle and fell swiftly. The psychological and military blow was significant, as the loss of these positions, especially Kibbutz Degania, symbolized a direct threat to the collective Zionist settlement movement.

== See also ==
- 1936–39 Arab revolt in Palestine
- Battle of Samakh
- Sykes–Picot Agreement
