= French expedition in Syria =

French expedition in Syria may refer to:

- French invasion of Egypt and Syria (1798–1801), Napoleon's campaign
- French intervention in the 1860 civil conflict in Mount Lebanon and Damascus
- Franco-Syrian War (1920), the establishment of the French mandate

== See also ==
- Crusades
