= Maysalun =

Mountainous region in Syria

- ميسلون
- Interactive map of Maysalun
- Elevation: 1,090 metres (3,580 ft)

Third Approach
- Location: Rif Dimashq Governorate, Syria
- Range: Anti-Lebanon Mountains
- Coordinates: 33°35′44″N 36°3′53″E

Maysalun (Arabic: ميسلون) is a mountainous region in southwestern Syria located on the eastern slopes of the Anti-Lebanon Mountains about 12 kilometers west of Damascus, in the Rif Dimashq Governorate and has an elevation of about 1090 meters. The area is situated on the ancient route between Damascus and Lebanon and has long been famous for its khans and rest-stops. The closest town in the area is al-Dimas.

Maysalun is enshrined in Syrian history as the last stand of the short-lived Arab Kingdom of Syria, which was ruled by King Faisal. The kingdom briefly controlled Syria after the Ottomans left and before the French took over control of Syria in the aftermath of the First World War. On 24 July 1920, a group of 2,000 Syrian volunteers gathered at the caravansary of Maysalun. There they faced the French Army, which drew on troops from its colonial territories, meaning Senegalese, Algerian, and Moroccan men made up the force. Yusuf al-'Azma, the Minister of War, died in the fighting. After the French forces defeated the Syrian defenders, they moved on to Damascus, where they began a 26-year occupation of the country. The Battle of Maysalun lingers in Syrian memory more broadly as symbol of, in the words of historian Eugene Rogan, "the betrayal of Britain's wartime promises, the bankruptcy of U.S. president Woodrow Wilson's vision of national self-determination, and the triumph of British and French colonial self-interest over the hopes and aspirations of millions of Arabs."
