= Sharifian Army =

- الجيش الشريفي
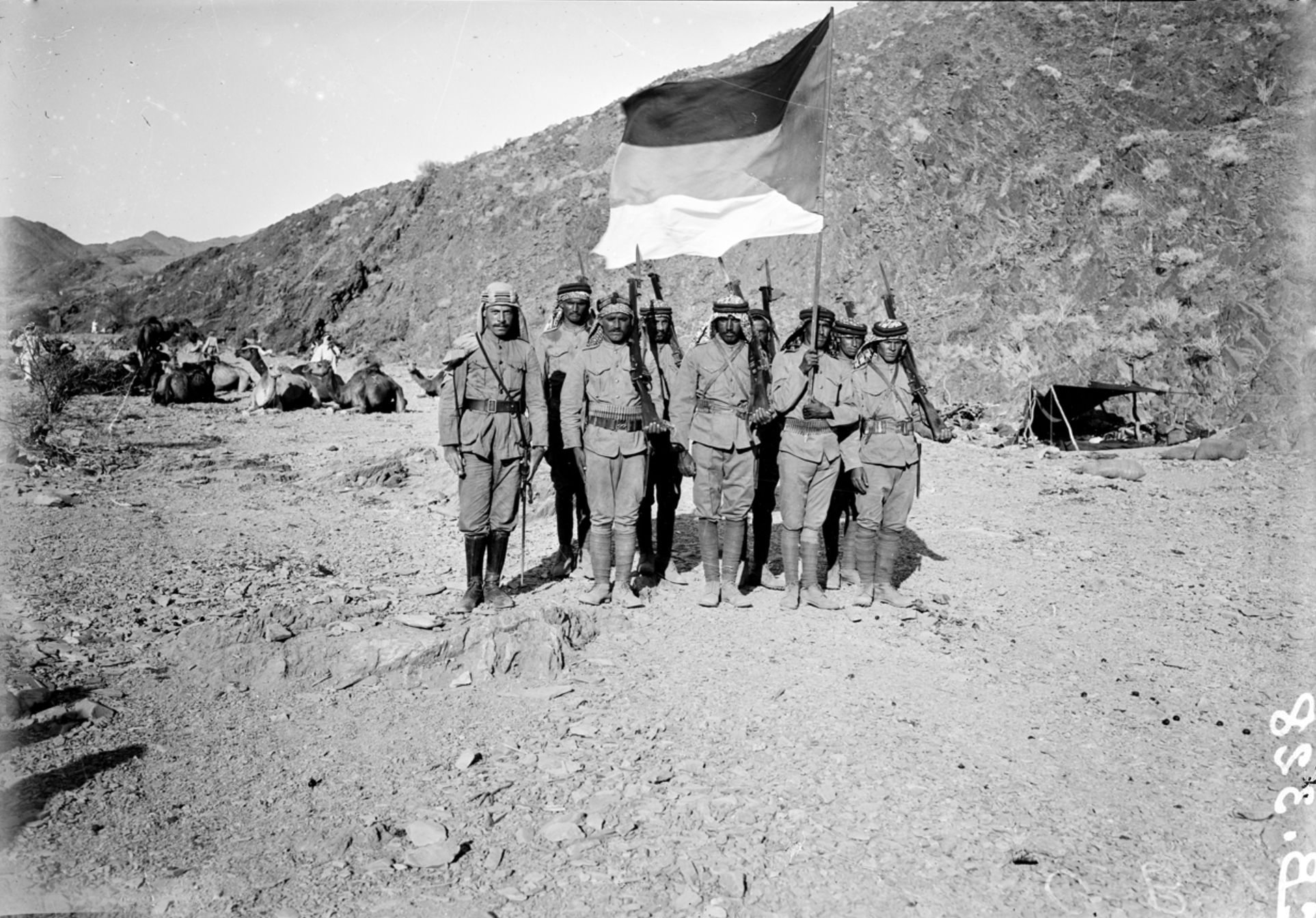
- Soldiers of the Sharifian Army in northern Yanbu carrying the Flag of the Arab Revolt.
- Active: 1916–1925
- Disbanded: 1925
- Country: Kingdom of Hejaz
- Allegiance: Hussein bin Ali
- Headquarters: Mecca; Jeddah; Taif
- Nickname(s): Arab Army; Hejazi Army
- Engagements: Arab Revolt; Al-Khurma dispute Saudi conquest of Hejaz

The Sharifian Army (Arabic: الجيش الشريفي), also known as the Arab Army (Arabic: الجيش العربي), or the Hejazi Army (Arabic: الجيش الحجازي) was the military force behind the Arab Revolt which was a part of the Middle Eastern theatre of World War I. Sharif Hussein bin Ali of the Kingdom of Hejaz, who was proclaimed "Sultan of the Arabs" in 1916, led the Sharifian Army in a rebellion against the Ottoman Empire with the ultimate goal of uniting the Arab people under an independent government. Aided both financially and militarily by the British, Hussein's forces gradually moved north through the Hejaz and, fought alongside the British-controlled Egyptian Expeditionary Force, eventually capturing Damascus. Once there, members of the Sharifian Army set up a short-lived monarchy known as the Arab Kingdom of Syria led by Faisal, a son of Hussein.

== Background ==
For centuries in the western region of Arabia where the Muslim holy cities of Mecca and Medina are located), power was strongly centralized in the hands of the family of the sharif. Members of this family, as descendants of Muhammad, were called Hashemites in English. Unlike many areas of the Ottoman Empire, there were few competing political influences among the urban elite. The tribal chieftains served as intermediaries between their tribes and the sharif but rarely challenged his authority. The sharif's lone political rival was the Ottoman vali (governor) of the region, who was responsible for ensuring Ottoman sovereignty over the region. A power struggle existed between the sharif and the vali; the authority to make decisions switched back and forth between the two over time. Overall, this political climate left a large amount of influence in the hands of the sharif, who in the early years of the 20th century was Sharif Husayn.

Dissatisfied with his limited power, Sharif Husayn began discussions with tribal leaders in the region, Arab nationalists, and the British High Commissioner in Egypt, Sir Henry McMahon. Husayn knew that many Muslims believed that the Sharif of Mecca was the rightful claimant to the caliphate, which was currently held by the family of the rulers of the Ottoman Empire. The British support that was pledged in the Husayn-McMahon Correspondence caused Husayn to emerge from these talks with a strengthened belief in his right to claim both the caliphate and sovereignty over Arab lands in the area. Furthermore, and more importantly, the promises made by the British to Husayn in the Husayn-McMahon Correspondence of 1915 and 1916 led Husayn to think that if he were to lead a successful revolt against the Ottomans, the British would help him establish an Arab Caliphate encompassing most of the Arabian Peninsula stretching as far north as present-day Turkey. Although the British could not promise a few districts that they had already pledged to give the French, the pieces seemed to be falling into place for Sharif Husayn, and he prepared to launch the Arab Revolt.

== The revolt ==
In early June 1916, the Ottoman government was putting pressure on Sharif Husayn to supply Hijazi troops and to issue a call for jihad from Mecca in support of the Ottoman participation in World War I. In exchange for the troops, Husayn wanted greater autonomy, but the Ottoman authorities would not concede it. Ottoman officials were holding Husayn's son Faysal and told Husayn that if he ever wanted to see his son again, he must send the troops. On June 9, 1916, the Ottomans sent Faysal to Medina to get the armed forces that Husayn had been organizing, but when he arrived, he escaped with his brother ‘Ali.

At the beginning of the revolt, the Sharifian Army consisted of these forces that had been assembled by Husayn and his sons under the guise that they were to fight with the Ottoman forces. After escaping, Faysal wrote a letter stating that if Husayn's demands for greater autonomy were not met their relations with the Ottomans would end. Rather than wait for a reply, the Arab Revolt was started with an attack on the Hijaz Railway by forces that consisted of members of local Arab tribes and Ottoman defectors. The following day the first shots of the revolt were fired in Mecca and within two days, the Sharifian Army was in control of Mecca. By June 16, the Sharifian Army, with the assistance of the British Royal Navy, captured the important port of Jeddah. By the end of the summer, the Arab forces under the control of Sharif Husayn had managed to overtake coastal cities as far north as Yanbu and as far south as Qunfudhah.

The Ottomans decisively won a battle for the first time when the Sharifian Army attacked Medina in October 1916. The Ottoman forces were entrenched in Medina with artillery that the poorly equipped Sharifian Army lacked. The Sharifian forces retreated and were forced to develop a new strategy in regard to Medina. Rather than attack the well-protected Ottoman army and suffer large casualties, the Arabs surrounded the city and cut it off from access to other Ottoman forces. For much of the war the Ottomans managed to keep the Hijaz Railway open to Medina and, through this, were able to continue to supply their men with weapons, ammunition, and other equipment until near the end of the war. The constant need for supplies in Medina played into the Sharifian strategy which was designed to have the Ottomans station troops along the railway and in Medina, wasting troops and supplies, while the Arabs continued up the coast of the Red Sea.

As the British and Sharifian forces sought a way to overtake the Ottoman forces at Aqaba, the British decided to send Captain (later Colonel) T. E. Lawrence (commonly referred to as “Lawrence of Arabia”) to help Faysal lead his forces. Lawrence's plan was to make the Ottomans think that the Arabs were planning on attacking Damascus by creating a few diversions, including the destruction of a railroad bridge in Baalbek. Upon arrival in Aqaba on July 6, 1917, the Sharifian forces brutally massacred about three hundred Ottomans before their superiors could get them under control. Another 150 Ottoman troops were taken prisoner and after a few subsequent small scale attacks by Ottomans, the Arab and British forces solidified control in Aqaba. From this point onwards, the Sharifian Army fought at the side of the British armed forces that were coming from British-occupied Egypt. The well executed Battle of Megiddo included a small amount of Sharifian forces who marched into Damascus on October 1, 1918, with their revolt almost complete. The only city still under Ottoman control in the Hijaz was the city of Medina. Although they were cut off from the rest of the Ottoman world, forces inside of Medina continued to resist Sharifian forces until their lack of supplies forced them to surrender in January 1919.

== Forces ==
The Sharifian Army consisted of about 5,000 regular forces and many thousands of irregular forces. Many of the regular forces were former Arab members of the Ottoman military who defected and joined the Arab Revolt. Irregular forces refer to largely untrained Arabs who joined the revolt for a short period of time when the fighting was taking place near their home. As the fighting stretched further from Mecca, many soldiers from around Mecca decided that they had done their part and returned home. The constant flow of British gold and weaponry into the hands of the Sharifian Army was the main driving force behind the Revolt. Many tribes would fight for whoever offered them the most money. Some tribal leaders would agree to fight for the British and accept their payment and weapons and soon afterwards begin fighting for the Ottomans because they offered to pay the tribes more. This fickleness showed that many of the tribes were not interested in Arab unity, the ultimate goal of Sharif Husayn, but rather just wanted to be paid. While this made things more difficult for the Sharifian Army, Faysal's strong negotiating skills won many tribal chieftains over, giving the Hashemites the support they needed to challenge the Ottomans.

The army was divided into four groups led by Sharif Husayn's sons, ‘Ali, ‘Abdullah, Faysal, and Zayd. Nuri al-Said and his brother-in-law Ja’far al-Askari, who had previously been a Colonel in the Ottoman Army, joined the Sharifian Army because of their strong belief in Arab nationalism and rose to become leaders within the Sharifian Army. The first few months of the revolt were led by ‘Ali and his forces which consisted of about 30,000 men, most of whom were irregular forces who only fought for a short period of time. By September 1916 these 30,000 were divided amongst all four of Husayn's sons who each now had at least 6,000 irregular forces under their control. The Sharifian Army consisted of about 4,000 regular forces by the beginning of 1917. The majority of these regular soldiers served under Husayn or ‘Ali. As the revolt continued, Faysal emerged as the most successful of the four brothers and most of the forces fell under his control. The fact that Faysal worked alongside Lawrence of Arabia gave him access to more British intelligence, which is a large part of the reason he was the most successful.

== Aftermath ==
Following the capture of Damascus at the end of the Arab Revolt, Faysal set up a Kingdom in Syria and ruled there until the French won the Franco-Syrian War on July 24, 1920, and ousted him from the country. In 1920, the League of Nations decided that the lands of the Ottoman Empire would be divided by a newly created mandate system. The country that received the mandate was responsible for guiding the new state formed by the mandate to its independence. The British received the Palestinian and Mesopotamia (Iraq) mandates and the French received the Mandate of Syria and Lebanon. These mandates and their maps closely followed the divisions presented in the secret Sykes-Picot Agreement of 1916. The Balfour Declaration complicated things in the region because rather than including Palestine within the land promised to Sharif Husayn as part of the Arab kingdom because of the Husayn-McMahon Correspondence, the British had promised to create a Jewish state in the region. While the question of Palestine was never resolved, in Cairo, in 1921, the British decided to name Husayn's son Abdullah as the emir in the newly created state of Transjordan. The British left Husayn in control of the Hijaz and, since Faysal was deposed by the French from his Kingdom of Syria in 1920, helped Faysal come to power in Iraq, becoming Faisal I of Iraq. Sharif Husayn continued to rule the Hijaz and on March 23, 1924, declared himself Caliph. In that same year the Saudis ousted Husayn from the Hijaz and he lived the remainder of his life in exile, dying in Jordan in 1931. Many other officers from the Sharifian Army, including Nuri al-Said, Jafar al-Askari, Jamil al-Midfai, Ali Jawdat al-Aiyubi, and Jamal Baban, played a prominent role in King Faysal's Iraq. Nuri al-Said and Ja’far al-Askari both served terms as prime minister. Officers from the Sharifian Army continued to play an important role in Iraqi politics until the 1963 coup led by Colonel Ahmad Hasan al-Bakr.

== See also ==
- Sharif of Mecca
- Jordanian Army - Successor
