= Mausoleum of Saladin =

Mausoluem of Saladin in Damascus, Syria

- ضريح صلاح الدين الأيوبي
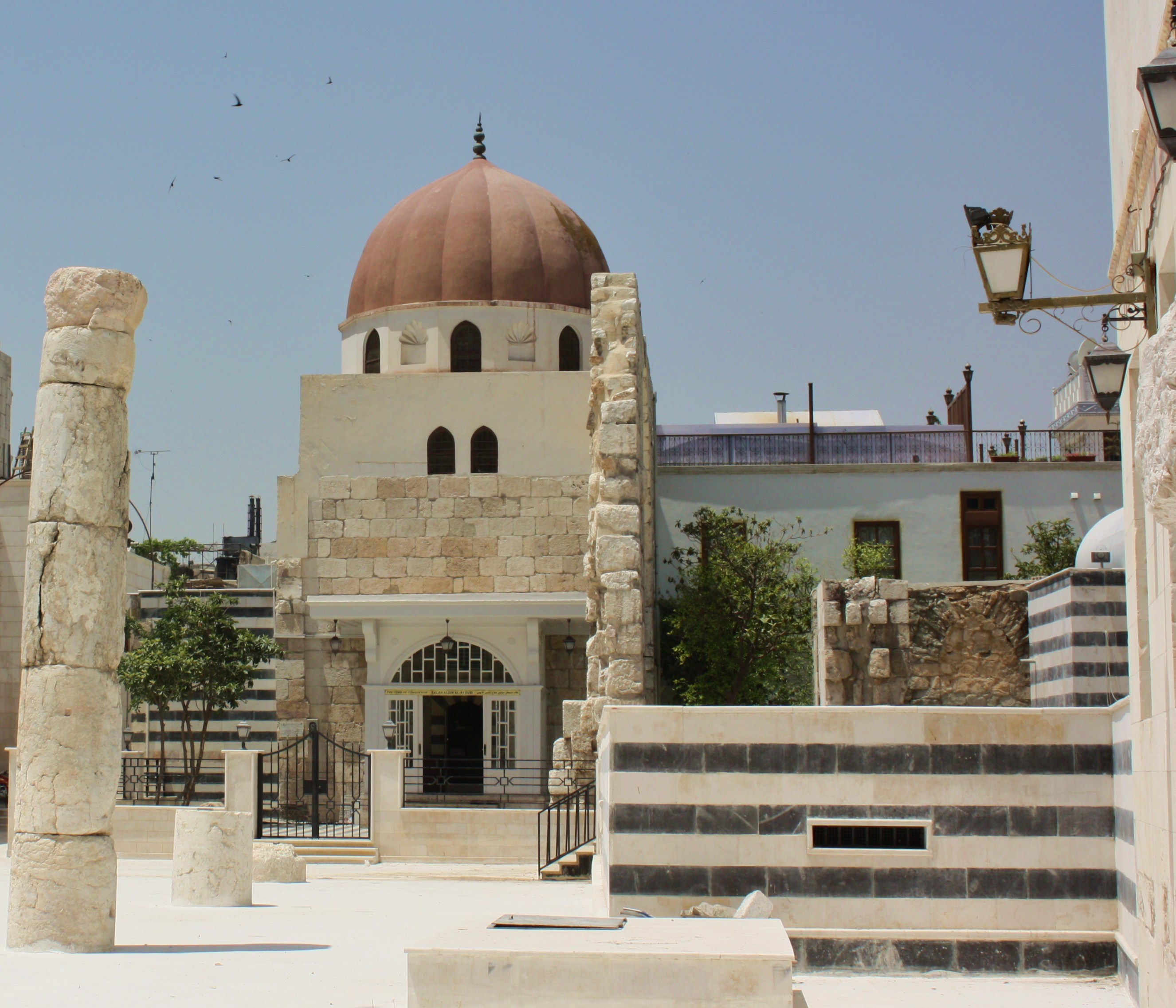
- The entrance to the mausoleum

General information
- Type: Mausoleum
- Architectural style: Ayyubid, Ottoman
- Location: Damascus, Syria
- Coordinates: 33°30′43.6″N 36°18′21.36″E
- Completed: 1196
- Renovated: 1898

The Mausoleum of Saladin holds the resting place and grave of the medieval Muslim Ayyubid Sultan Saladin. It is adjacent to the Umayyad Mosque in Damascus, Syria. It was built in 1196, three years after the death of Saladin. In addition to the tomb, the tomb complex included Madrassah al-Aziziah, of which little remains, except a few columns and an internal arch adjacent to the renovated tomb.

== History ==
Sultan Saladin was Sultan of Egypt. He fought against the Crusader states and negotiated a truce with King Richard the Lionheart of England to end the Third Crusade by guaranteeing Christian pilgrims the right to free passage to Jerusalem. After the Crusades, Saladin gave the majority of his wealth away to the point where when he did die, there was no money left for the funeral. His son erected the Mausoleum of Saladin as a modest tomb near the Umayyid Mosque with Saladin's body being buried in a wooden sarcophagus.

The mausoleum presently houses two sarcophagi: one made of wood, said to contain Saladin's remains, and one made of marble, was built in homage to Saladin in late nineteenth century by Ottoman Sultan Abdulhamid II and was later restored by German emperor Wilhelm II. Along with a marble sarcophagus, a golden ornate gilt bronze wreath was also put on the marble sarcophagus, which was later removed by either Faisal I or Lawrence of Arabia, who later deposited it in the Imperial War Museum. When it was deposited at the Imperial War Museum, Lawrence of Arabia noted on the deposit note: "Saladin no longer required it".

== Gallery ==
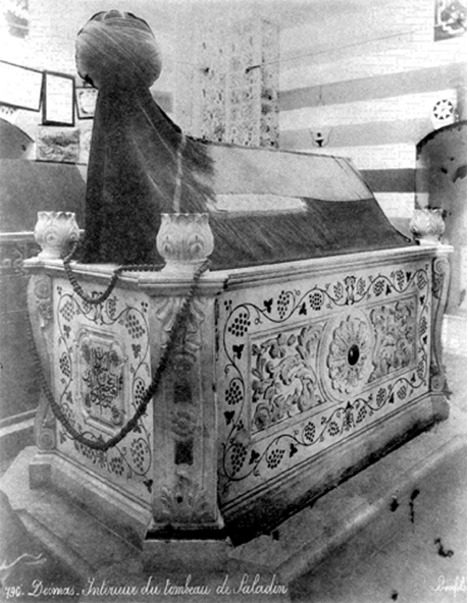
c sarcophagus built by Ottoman Sultan Abdulhamid II and later restored by Wilhelm II

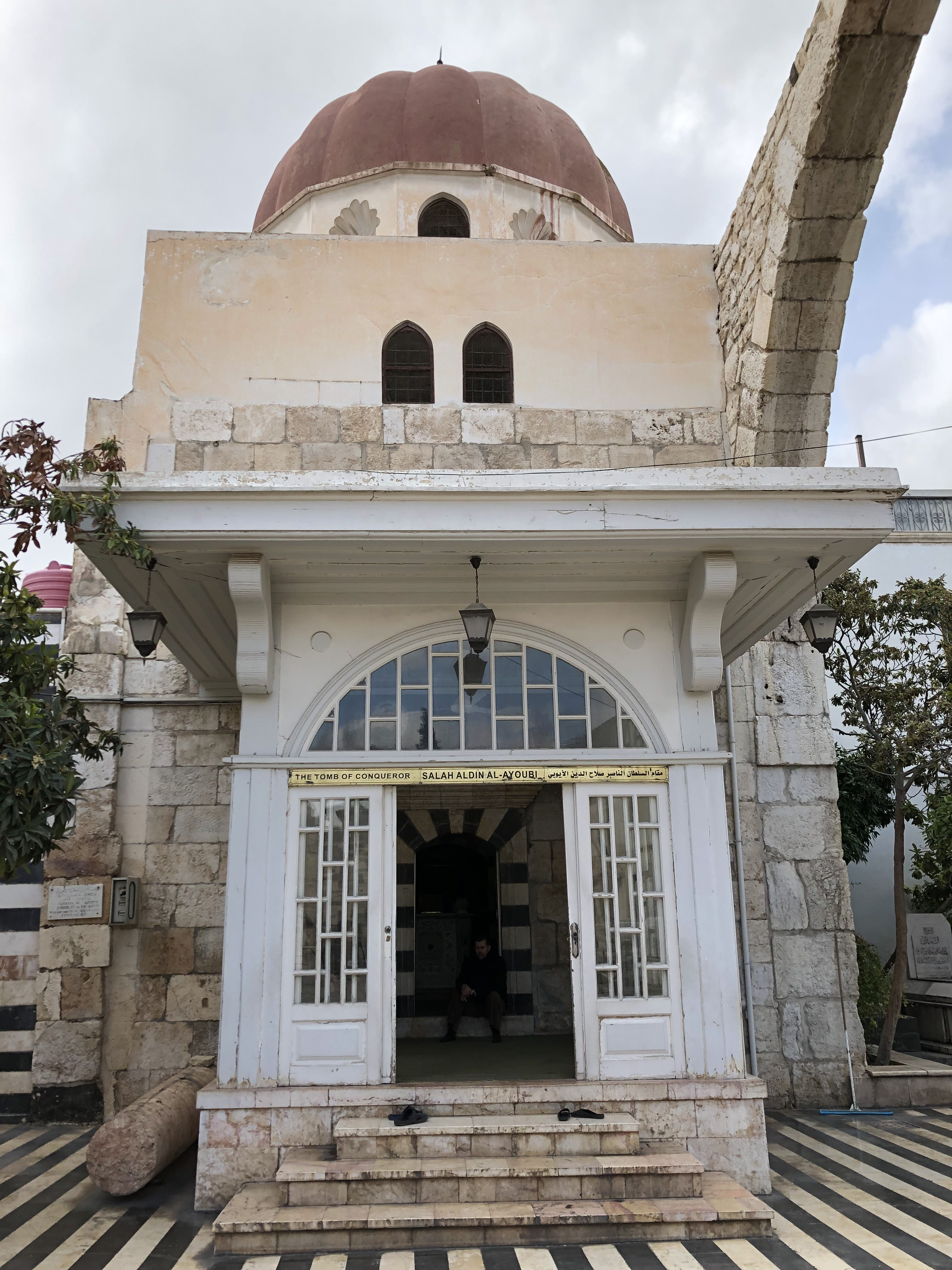
Entrance to Saladin's Mausoleum, 2019

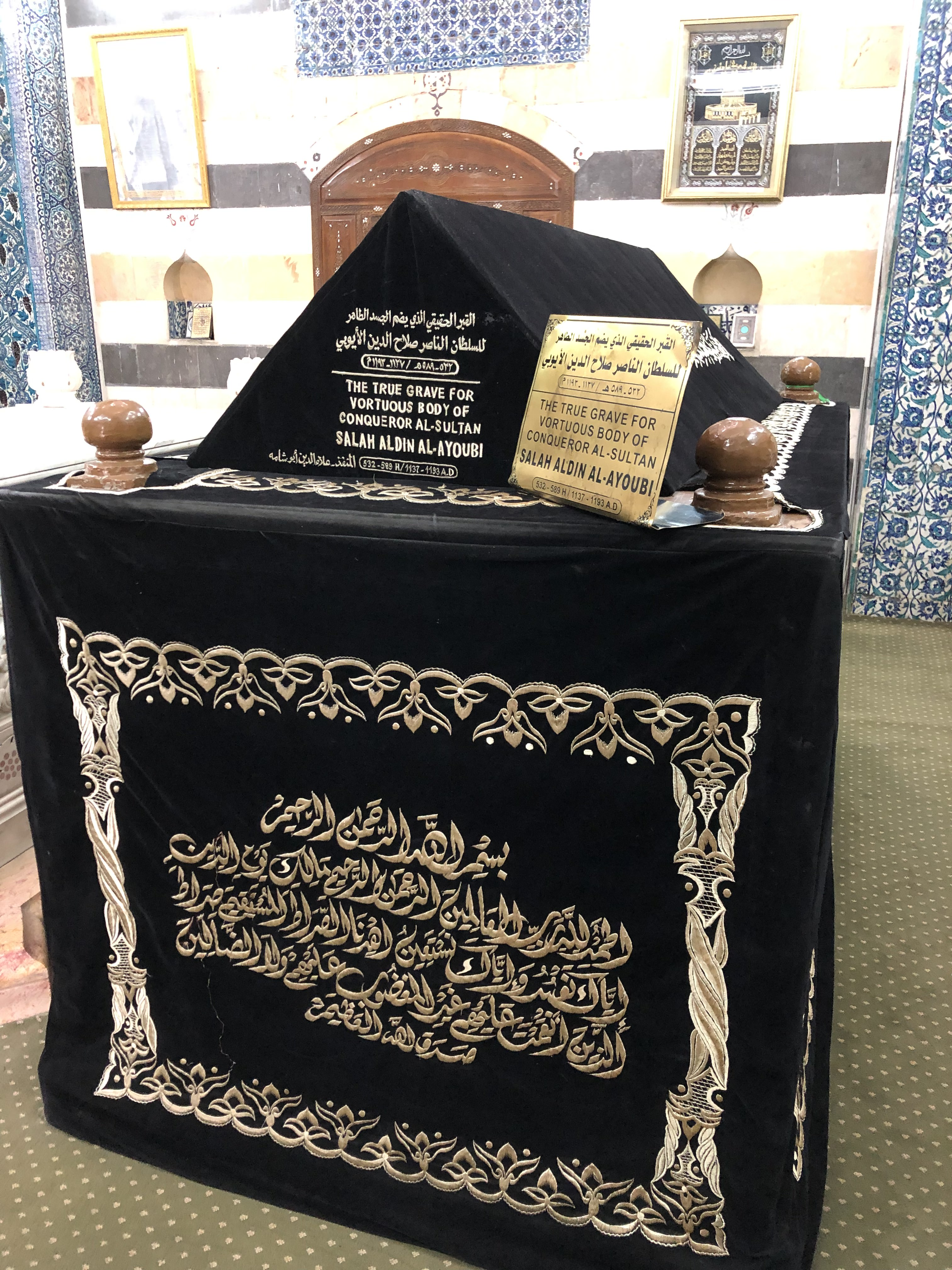
Saladin's original tomb, 2019

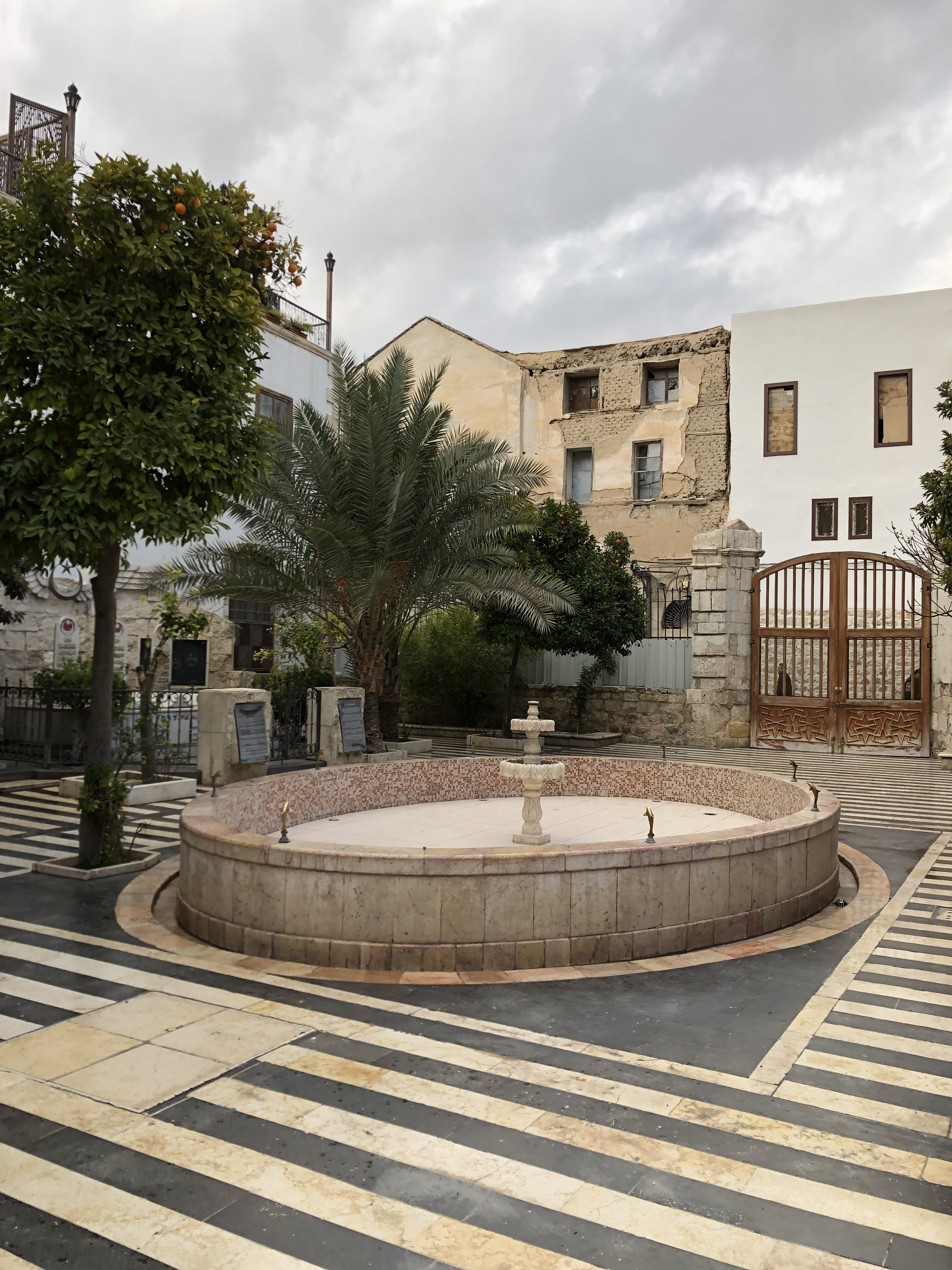
Courtyard of Saladin's Mausoleum, 2019

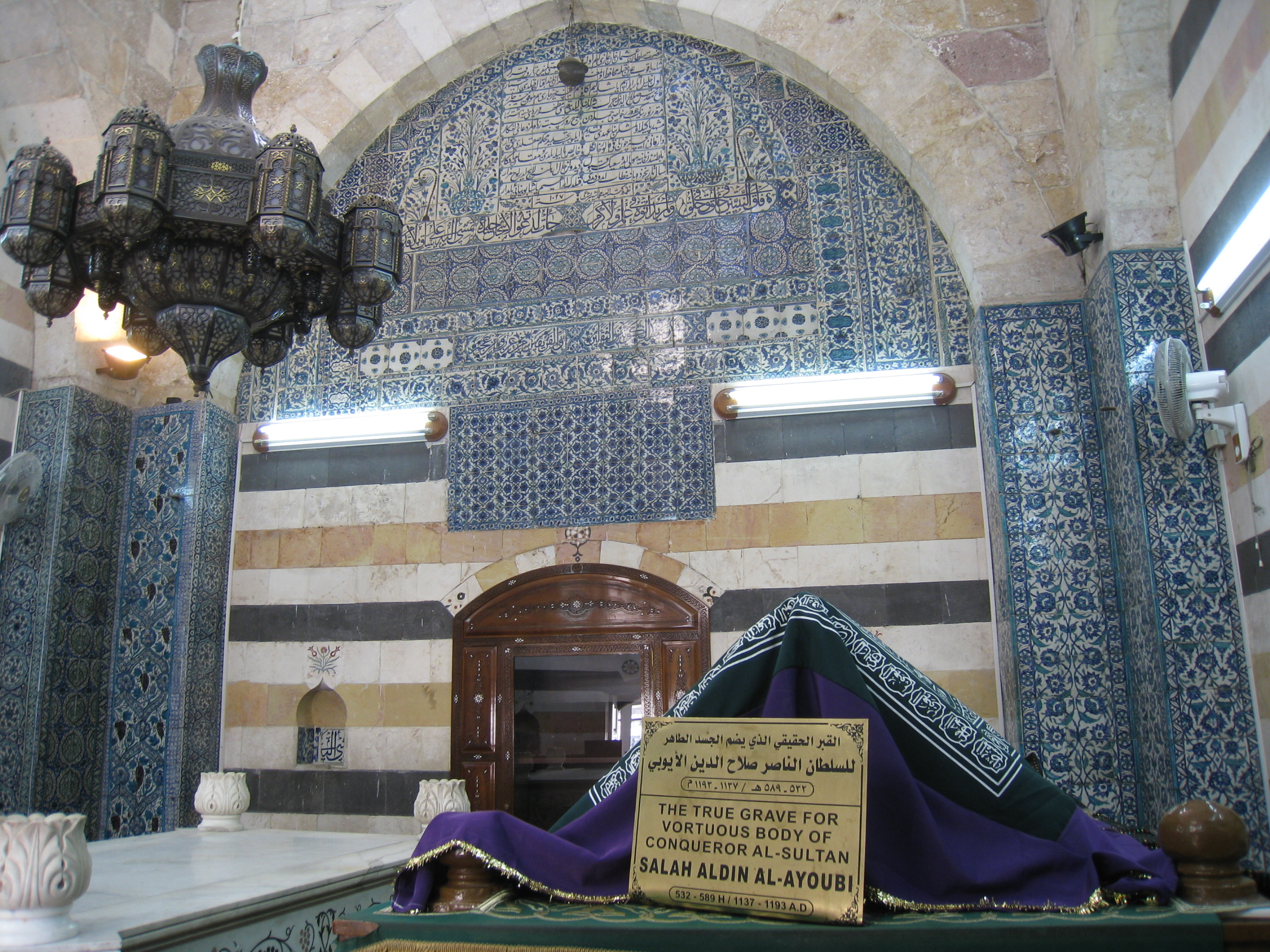
Mausoleum walls with tiles added in Ottoman era.

== Bibliography ==
- Mannheim, Ivan (2001). Syria & Lebanon Handbook: The Travel Guide. Footprint Travel Guides. ISBN 978-1-900949-90-3.
- Berney, K. A.; Ring, Trudy (1996). International dictionary of historic places: Middle East and Africa, Volume 4. Taylor & Francis. ISBN 978-1-884964-03-9.
  - Man, John (2015). Saladin: The Life, the Legend and the Islamic Empire. Random House. ISBN 978-1-473508-54-5.
