= Franco-Syrian War =

1920 war in the Middle East

- Part of the interwar period
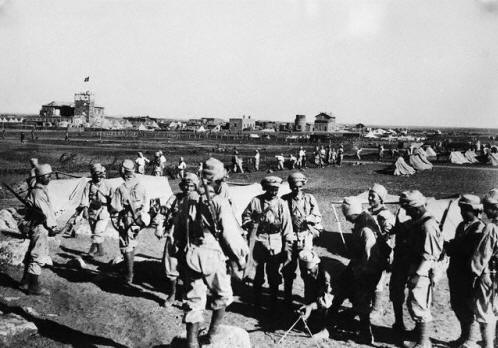
- Syrian soldiers at Maysalun, 1920
Date	8 March – 25 July 1920 (4 months, 2 weeks and 3 days)
Location	Syria and OETA
Result	French victory; Establishment of French Syria; King Faisal expelled to Iraq
Territorial changes	Dissolution of the Arab Kingdom of Syria

Belligerents
France: Lebanon; (French Third Republic) West Africa	Syrian Arab Kingdom

Commanders and leaders
(French Third Republic) Alexandre Millerand (French Third Republic) Henri Gouraud (French Third Republic) Mariano Goybet (French Third Republic) Georges Clemenceau	King Faisal (surrendered); Yusuf al-'Azma † (Kingdom of Hejaz) Ibrahim Hananu (Kingdom of Hejaz) Subhi Barakat (Kingdom of Hejaz) Saleh al-Ali

Strength
70,000 French soldiers	Unknown

The Franco-Syrian War took place during 1920 between France and the Hashemite rulers of the newly established Arab Kingdom of Syria. During a series of engagements, which climaxed in the Battle of Maysalun, French forces defeated the forces of the Hashemite monarch King Faisal, and his supporters, entering Damascus on July 24, 1920. A new pro-French government was declared in Syria on July 25, headed by 'Alaa al-Din al-Darubi and the region of Syria was eventually divided into several client states under the Mandate for Syria and the Lebanon. The British government, concerned for their position in the new mandate in Iraq, agreed to declare the fugitive Faisal as the new king of Iraq.

== Background ==
Near the end of World War I, the Egyptian Expeditionary forces of Edmund Allenby captured Damascus on September 30, 1918, and shortly thereafter on October 3, 1918, Hashemite ruler Faisal entered Damascus as well, in the final stages of the Arab Revolt against the Ottomans. On October 5, 1918, with the permission of General Allenby, Faisal announced the establishment of an Arab constitutional government in Damascus.

Following the implementation of the initially secretive 1916 Sykes-Picot Agreement, which divided the occupied remnants of the Ottoman Empire between France and Britain, French military administration was established in the Levant. General Henri Gouraud was appointed as representative of the French government in the Middle East and commander of the French Army of the Levant, centered in Syria.

While events transpired in Europe that would eventually render the Arab Kingdom of Syria into a French mandate, it would also catalyze Syrian nationalist societies like al-Fatat (the Young Arab Society) to make preparations for a national congress. These Syrian nationalist societies advocated complete independence for an Arab Kingdom, uniting the Arab world under the Hashemite ruler Faisal. The first official session of the Syrian Congress was held on June 3, 1919, and al-Fatat member Hashim al-Atassi was elected its president. On June 25, the King-Crane Commission arrived in Damascus to a flurry of leaflets which said "Independence or Death". On July 2, 1919, the Syrian Congress passed a number of resolutions pertaining to the formation of Syria as a completely independent constitutional monarchy with Faisal as king, asking for assistance from the United States, and the refusal of any rights claimed by the French. The hopes of Faisal that either the British or Americans would come to his aid and intervene against the French quickly faded with what many consider the defining catalyst for the creation and destruction of the Arab Kingdom of Syria: the Anglo-French Agreement, which provided for the withdrawal of British troops from Syria starting on 1 November, rendering OETA East a sole Arab administration on 26 November 1919, thus having the French only answer to themselves in the upholding of the Anglo-French Declaration. It was signed on 15 September 1919 by Lloyd George and Clemenceau.

Eventually, Faisal would be forced into negotiations with Clemenceau in January 1920 which stipulated that the French would uphold the existence of the Syrian state and would not station troops in Syria as long as the French government remained the only government supplying advisers, counselors and technical experts. News of this compromise did not bode well with Faisal's vehemently anti-French and independence minded supporters who immediately pressured Faisal to reverse his commitment to France, which he did.

== Warfare chronology ==
=== Countrywide revolts ===
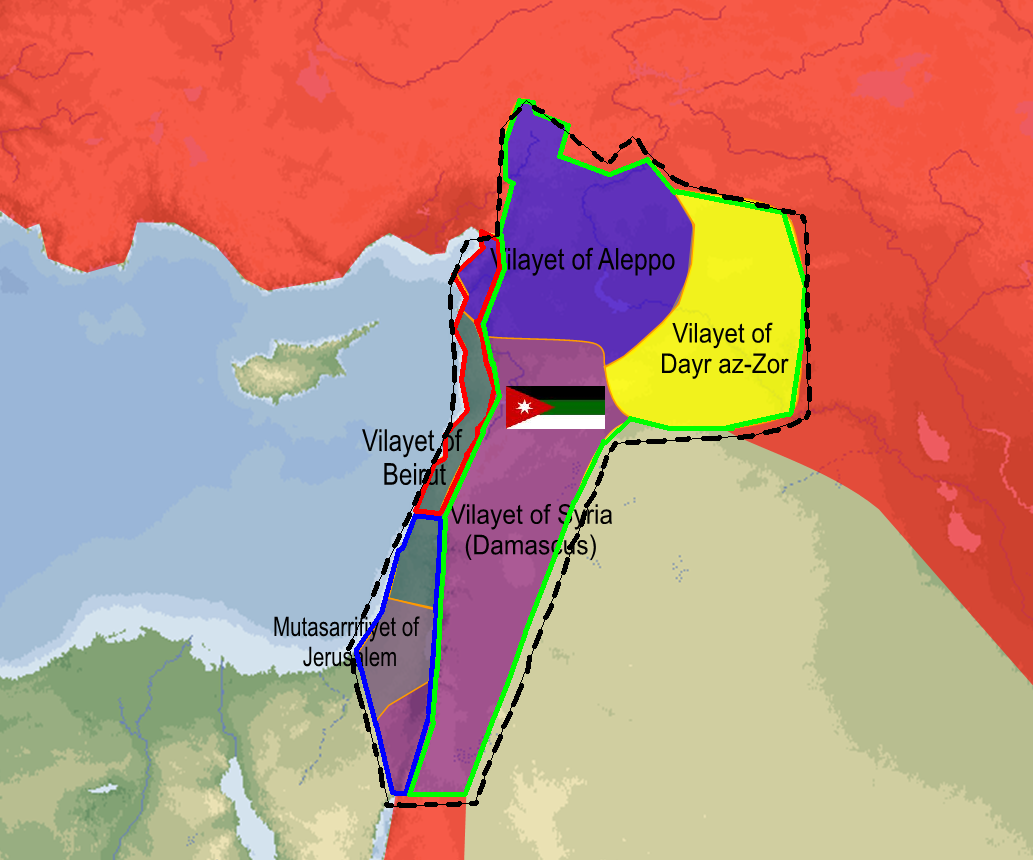
Map of the Arab Kingdom of Syria, declared on March 8, 1920

In the aftermath of the Clemenceau negotiations in January 1920, violent attacks against French forces occurred sporadically across Syria. In March 1920, the Syrian Congress assembled to declare Faisal the king of Syria, as well as to officially set up the Arab Kingdom of Syria with Hashim al-Atassi as Prime Minister. An independent Arab Kingdom of Syria was proclaimed in Damascus on March 8, 1920, in an apparent dispute with the French over the nature of its rule. This action was immediately repudiated by the British and French and the San Remo Conference was called together by the League of Nations in April 1920 to explicitly establish the mandate of the French over Syria.

Syrian Arab nationalists rejected the mandate and went to war with the French. The war soon became a devastating campaign for the newly proclaimed Arab Kingdom of Syria. Several violent incidents in the region initiated by Arab militias, like the Battle of Tel Hai and the raid on Samakh, led to further international support for the French.

The League of Nations having given the French Mandate of Syria as planned, the French General Gouraud issued an ultimatum to the Syrian Arab government to disband its troops and submit to French control. Worried about the results of a long bloody fight with the French, King Faisal himself surrendered on July 14, 1920. However, his message would not reach the General and King Faisal's defense minister Yusuf al-'Azma, who ignoring the King, led an army to Maysalun to defend Syrian Arab Kingdom from French advance. The Hashemite government of Damascus submitted reluctantly to the French ultimatum and disbanded its troops.

=== Battle of Maysalun ===
In spite of King Faisal's reluctant acceptance of France's ultimatum, Yusuf al-'Azma refused to give in. He raised a small body of disbanded troops and civilians, poorly armed relative to the modern, well-equipped professional French Army, and led them to Maysalun. Although he had no illusions about the outcome of the battle, al-'Azma wanted to make it clear that Arab Syria would not surrender without fighting, in order to deny the French occupation any legitimacy. The Battle of Maysalun on July 24 resulted in a crushing Syrian defeat. The French forces under the command of General Mariano Goybet easily defeated the Syrian forces. Yusuf al-'Azma himself was killed in the battle. Lebanese Maronite volunteers reportedly fought alongside the French in the battle and openly celebrated the French victory.

=== Final stages ===
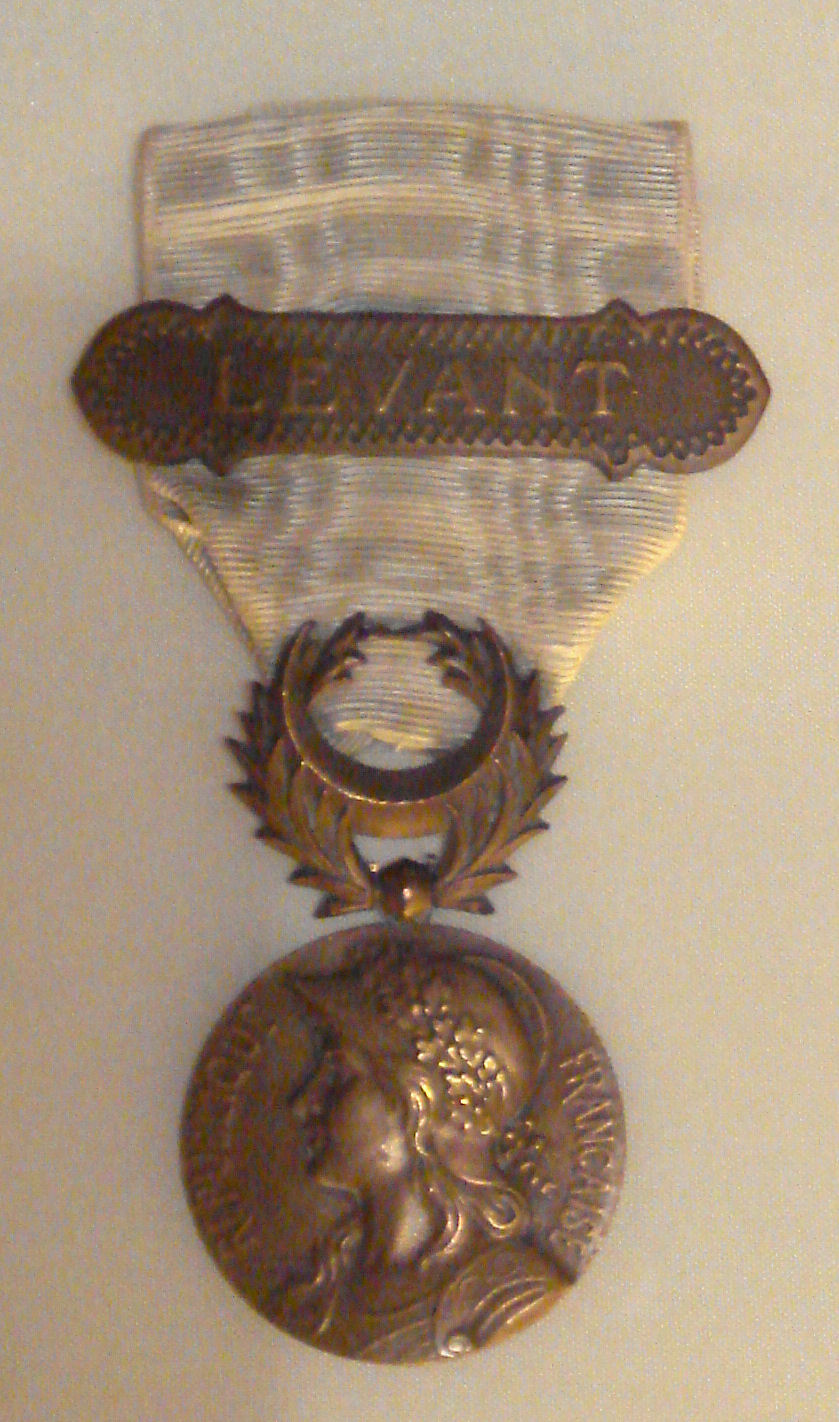
Award to French veterans - the Cilicia Levant medal law 18 July 1922

The final stage of the war took place on July 24, 1920, when the French forces entered Damascus without any resistance. The next day, the Arab Kingdom of Syria was abolished, and French rule officially reinstalled.

== Aftermath ==
Following the San Remo conference and the defeat of King Faisal's short-lived monarchy in Syria at the Battle of Maysalun, the French general Henri Gouraud established civil administration in the territory. The mandate region was subdivided into six states. They were the State of Damascus (1920), State of Aleppo (1920), Alawite State (1920), Jabal Druze (1921), the autonomous Sanjak of Alexandretta (1921) (modern-day Hatay in Turkey) and the State of Greater Lebanon (1920), which became later the modern country of Lebanon.

== See also ==
- List of modern conflicts in the Middle East
- Syrian Revolution
- Sultan al-Atrash

== Bibliography ==
- France Syria Occupation 1919-1920
