= Arab Kingdom of Syria =

1919–1920 self-proclaimed state

Syrian Arab Kingdom المملكة السورية العربية (Arabic) al-Mamlaka al-Sūriya al-ʿArabiyya
- 1920
- Flag Coat of arms
- Anthem: Suriyah, Ya Dhat al-Majdi سوريا يا ذات المجد; O Syria, Who Owns the Glory
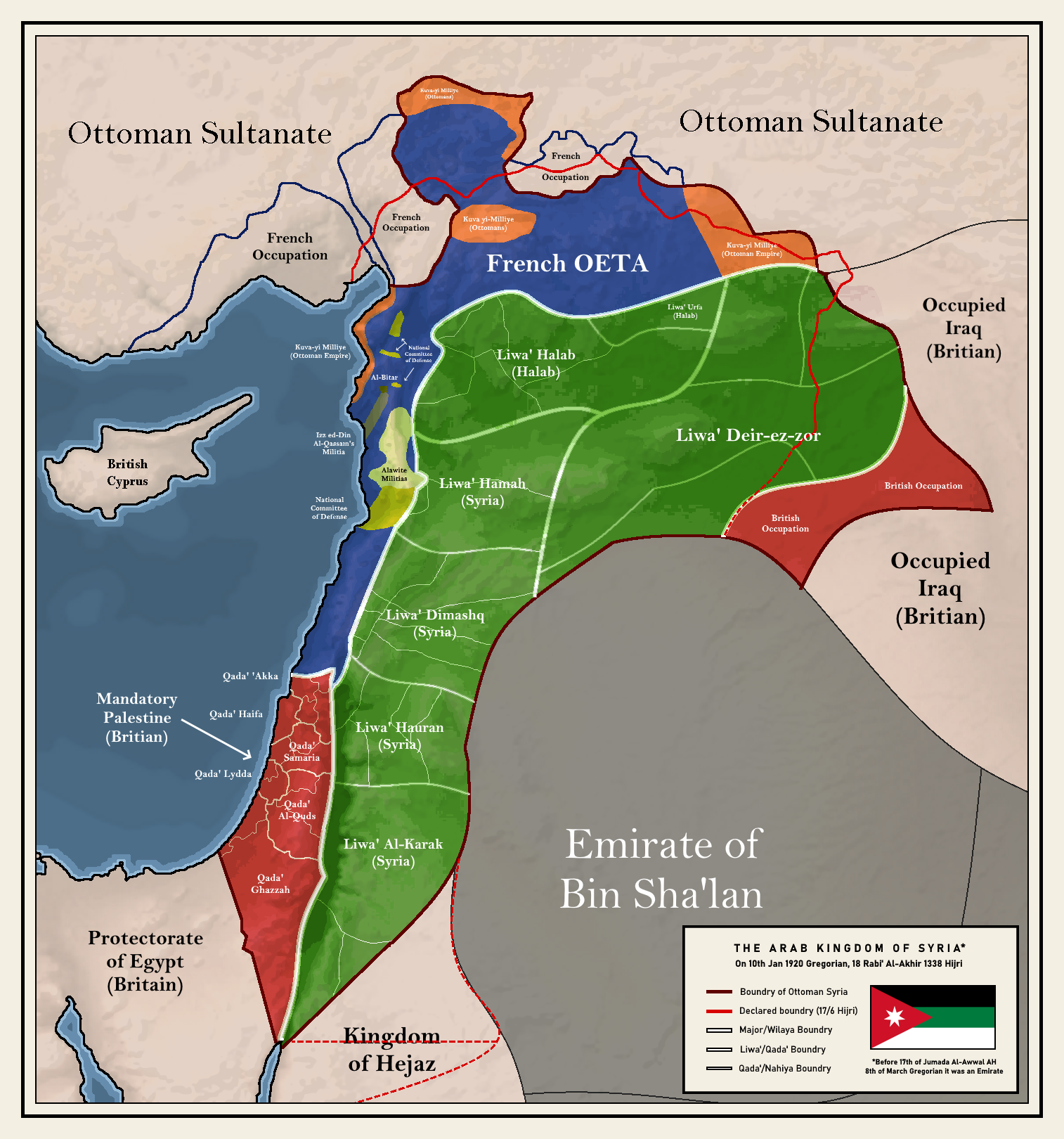
- The Arab Kingdom of Syria at its greatest extent in January 1920
- Capital: Damascus
- Common languages: Arabic
- Demonym: Syrian
- Government: Unitary parliamentary constitutional monarchy
- King
  - 1920: Faisal I
- Prime Minister
  - 1920: Rida Pasha al-Rikabi
  - 1920: Hashim al-Atassi
- Legislature: National Congress
- Historical era: Interwar period
  - British withdrawal: 26 November 1919
  - Coronation of Faisal I: 8 March 1920
  - Battle of Maysalun: 24 July 1920
  - Siege of Damascus: 25 July 1920
- Currency: Syrian pound
Preceded by
Occupied Enemy Territory Administration
Succeeded by
State of Damascus
State of Aleppo
Emirate of Transjordan
Interregnum (Transjordan)

The Syrian Arab Kingdom (Arabic: المملكة العربية السورية, al-Mamlakah al-ʿArabiyyah al-Sūriyyah) (Note: Also known as the Arab Kingdom of Syria) was an unrecognized monarchy existing briefly in the territory of historical Syria. It was announced on 5 October 1918 as a fully independent Arab constitutional government with the permission of the British Empire. It gained independence as an emirate after the withdrawal of British forces from OETA East on 26 November 1919, and was proclaimed a kingdom on 8 March 1920.

As a kingdom, the state existed for a little over four months, from 8 March to 25 July 1920. During its brief existence, the kingdom was led by Faisal bin Hussein, son of Hussein bin Ali, Sharif of Mecca. Despite its claims over the region of Syria, Faisal's government controlled a limited area and was dependent on Britain, which, along with France, generally opposed the idea of a Greater Syria and refused to recognize the kingdom. After a four-month-long war, the kingdom surrendered to French forces on 25 July 1920.

== History ==
=== Foundations ===
The Arab Revolt and the McMahon–Hussein Correspondence were crucial factors in the foundation of the Arab Kingdom of Syria. In the McMahon–Hussein Correspondence promises of an Arab kingdom were made by the British in return for an Arab uprising against the Ottomans. As the British were promising independence, the French made the Sykes–Picot Agreement. Ultimately, the implementation of the Sykes–Picot Agreement would lead to the undermining and end of the Arab Kingdom of Syria. Despite the significance of the Arab Revolt to modern Arab countries formed in its wake, at the time there was significant distrust and even opposition to the idea of an Arab kingdom or series of Arab kingdoms.

This opposition was due in part to the heavy influence of the French and the British in facilitating the revolt and the establishment of what would be considered, by modern standards, puppet states. The involvement of foreign powers in distributing large sums of money and military support to establish an empire that would be led by imperial aspirants, rather than legitimate Arab nationalists, was instrumental in the disintegration of the majority of the early Hashemite kingdoms (Hejaz and Iraq). Additionally, at the time, many Arabs expressed grave concerns that the family of the sharif of Mecca, the Hashemites, could wrest control from the Ottoman sultan, with whom their loyalty had rested for centuries.

=== Arab constitutional government ===
Damascus was captured in the beginning of October 1918 when British troops, the Desert Mounted Corps, Prince Feisal's Sherifial Hejaz Army and an Arabic army under Sharif Nasir of Medina had encircled the city. During the pursuit to Damascus, many rearguards established by remnants of the Ottoman Fourth and Seventh Armies captured Damascus on 30 September 1918. Faisal's jubilation would be short-lived, as Faisal would soon be made aware of the Sykes–Picot agreement. Faisal had come to expect an independent Arab kingdom in the name of his father but was soon told of the division of territory and how Syria fell under French protective power. Faisal saw this admission as a betrayal by the British, but believed the actual settlement would be worked out at a later date when the war had ended. There was some likelihood that by then the British would have changed their support for French pretensions in Syria.

On 5 October, with the permission of General Allenby, Faisal announced the establishment of a fully and absolutely independent Arab constitutional government. Faisal announced it would be an Arab government based on justice and equality for all Arabs regardless of religion. The French Prime Minister Georges Clemenceau found disconcerting the establishment of a semi-independent Arab state without international recognition and under the auspices of the British. Even reassurances by Allenby that all actions taken were provisional did not ease the looming tensions between the British, the French, and the Arabs. For Arab nationalists, and many of the Arabs who fought in the Arab Revolt, this independent state would be the realization of a long hard-fought goal.

=== Determining the status ===
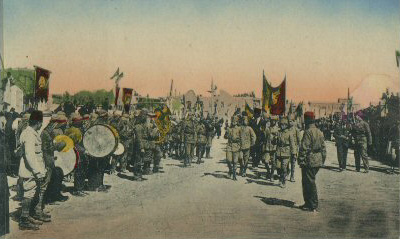
Proclamation of Faisal I as King of Syria in 1920.

After the war, at the Paris Peace Conference of 1919, Faisal pushed for Arab independence. At the Conference, the victorious Allies decided what was to become of the defeated nations of the Central Powers, especially who was to control their territories, such as the Ottoman Empire's Middle East possessions. The status of the Arab lands in the Middle East was the subject of intense negotiations between the French and British. In May 1919, the French and British prime ministers met in Quai d’Orsay to decide between them their respective claims to territories or spheres of influence in the Middle East. The meeting determined that in return for a British guarantee of French control in Syria, the British would be given a mandate over Mosul and Palestine.

At about the same time, an American compromise resulted in an agreement to set up a commission to determine the wishes of the inhabitants. Though they initially supported the idea, Britain and France eventually backed out, leaving the King–Crane Commission of 1919 solely American. The findings of the commission, not published until 1922 after the vote on the mandates in the League of Nations, indicated strong Arab support for an independent Arab state and opposition to a French presence.

=== Creation ===
Royal Standard of the King of Syria

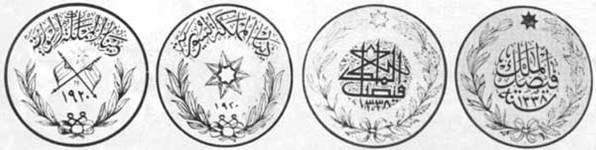
Currency of the Arab Kingdom

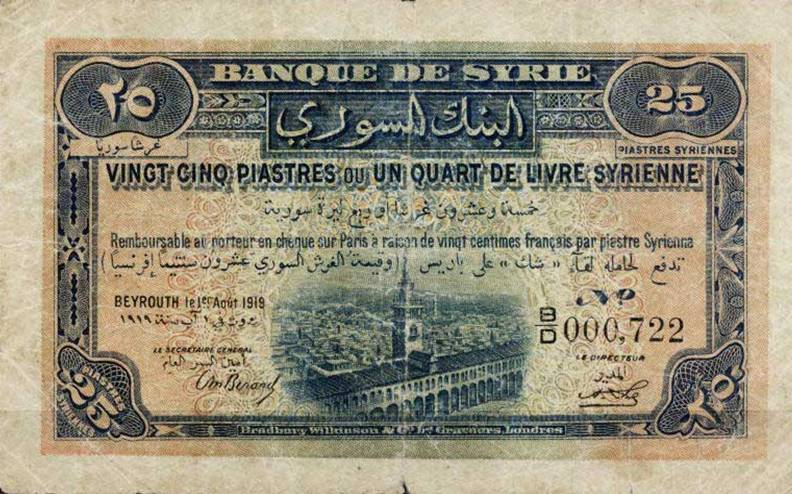
25 Syrian piastre banknote issued in Beirut by the Bank of Syria in 1919. The Bank of Syria was later renamed the Bank of Syria and Greater Lebanon and continued issuing currency for both Syria and Lebanon until the 1950s.

These events in Europe led Syrian nationalist societies like al-Fatat (the Young Arab Society) to make preparations for a national congress. These Syrian nationalist societies advocated complete independence for an Arab Kingdom that united Arabs under Faisal. The King–Crane Commission encouraged efforts to unify, and hasty elections were called including representatives from all over the Arab lands, including Palestine and Lebanon, although French officials prevented many of their representatives from arriving. The first official session of the Syrian Congress was held on 3 June 1919 and al-Fatat member Hashim al-Atassi was elected its president.

When the King–Crane Commission arrived in Damascus on 25 June 1919, it was met with a flurry of leaflets saying "Independence or Death".

On 2 July the Syrian National Congress in Damascus passed the Damascus Program, a series of resolutions calling for a completely independent constitutional monarchy with Faisal as king, asking for assistance from the United States, and rejecting any rights claimed by the French. The resolutions defined the borders as

on the north, the Taurus Range; on the south, a line running from Rafah to Al-Jauf and following the Syria-Hejaz border below 'Aqaba; on the east, the boundary formed by the Euphrates and Khabur rivers and a line stretching from some distance east of Abu-Kamal to some distance east of al-Jauf; on the west, the Mediterranean Sea.

Any hope that Faisal may have had that either the British or Americans would come to his aid and counter French moves quickly faded, especially after the Anglo-French Agreement for the withdrawal of British troops from Syria and the end of the British military government in Syria. The British withdrew from the region on 26 November 1919.

In January 1920, Faisal was forced into an agreement with France which stipulated that France would uphold the existence of the Syrian state and would not station troops in Syria as long as the French government remained the only government supplying advisers, counselors and technical experts. News of this compromise did not bode well with Faisal's vehemently anti-French and independence-minded supporters who immediately pressured Faisal to reverse his commitment, which he did. In the aftermath of this reversal, violent attacks against French forces took place and the Syrian Congress assembled in March 1920 to declare Faisal the king of Syria as well as to officially set up the Arab Kingdom of Syria with Hashim al-Atassi as Prime Minister and Yusuf al-'Azma as Minister of War and Chief of Staff.

This unilateral action was immediately repudiated by the British and French and the San Remo Conference was called by the Allied Powers in April 1920 to finalise the allocation of League of Nations mandates in the Middle East. This was in turn repudiated by Faisal and his supporters. After months of instability and failure to make good on the promises to the French, the commander of French forces General Henri Gouraud gave an ultimatum to King Faisal on 14 July 1920 declaring he surrender or fight.

=== Dissolution ===
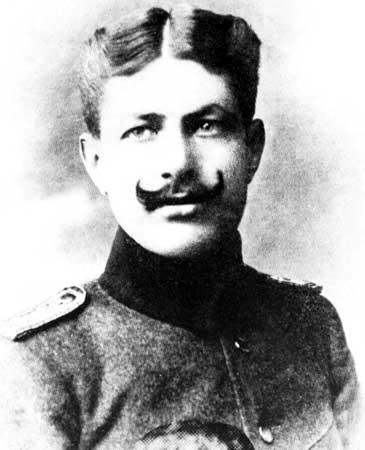
General Yusuf al-Azma

Worried about the results of a long bloody fight with the French, King Faisal surrendered. However, Yusuf al-'Azma, the defense minister, ignored the King's order, and led a small army to confront the French advance into Syria. This army depended mainly on individual weapons and were no match to the French artillery. At the Battle of Maysalun, the Syrian army was easily defeated by the French, with General al-'Azma being killed during the battle. The loss led to the siege and capture of Damascus on 24 July 1920 and the French Mandate for Syria and the Lebanon was put into effect thereafter.

== Legacy ==
After surrendering to French forces, Faisal was expelled from Syria and went to live in the United Kingdom in August 1920. In August 1921 he was offered the crown of Iraq under the British Mandate of Iraq.

A pro-French government under the leadership of Aladdin Al-Droubi was installed one day after the fall of Damascus, on 25 July 1920. On 1 September 1920, General Gouraud divided the French mandate territory of Syria into several smaller states as part of a French scheme to make Syria easier to control.

The Kingdom, through its short and tumultuous existence, would become a subject of great inspiration to later Arab liberation movements. It would be the often-repeated story of an Arab people, breaking out from their colonial bonds only to be castigated for their revolutionary fervor and for their resistance to the imperial powers. The symbolism of the fall of the Kingdom of Syria also imparted deep mistrust of European powers, who were seen as liars and oppressors.

== Politics of Syria (1918–1920) ==
The Kingdom of Syria had a structure such as a unitary state with government decentralization put in place, but Adam Mestyan of the Princeton University Press argued instead that the Kingdom of Syria was a federation. It also operated under a parliamentary system of government.

=== Heads of Government ===
Name	Term start	Term end	Political Party
Muhammad Said al-Jazairi	30 September 1918	30 September 1918	
Ali Rida Pasha al-Rikabi	30 September 1918	5 October 1918	
Emir Faisal	5 October 1918	8 March 1920	

=== King ===
Name	Reign Start	Reign end
Faisal I	8 March 1920	28 July 1920

=== Prime Ministers ===
Name	Term start	Term end	Political Party
Ali Rida Pasha al-Rikabi	8 March 1920	3 May 1920	
Hashim al-Atassi	3 May 1920	28 July 1920	
