= Henri Gouraud =

French general (1867–1946)

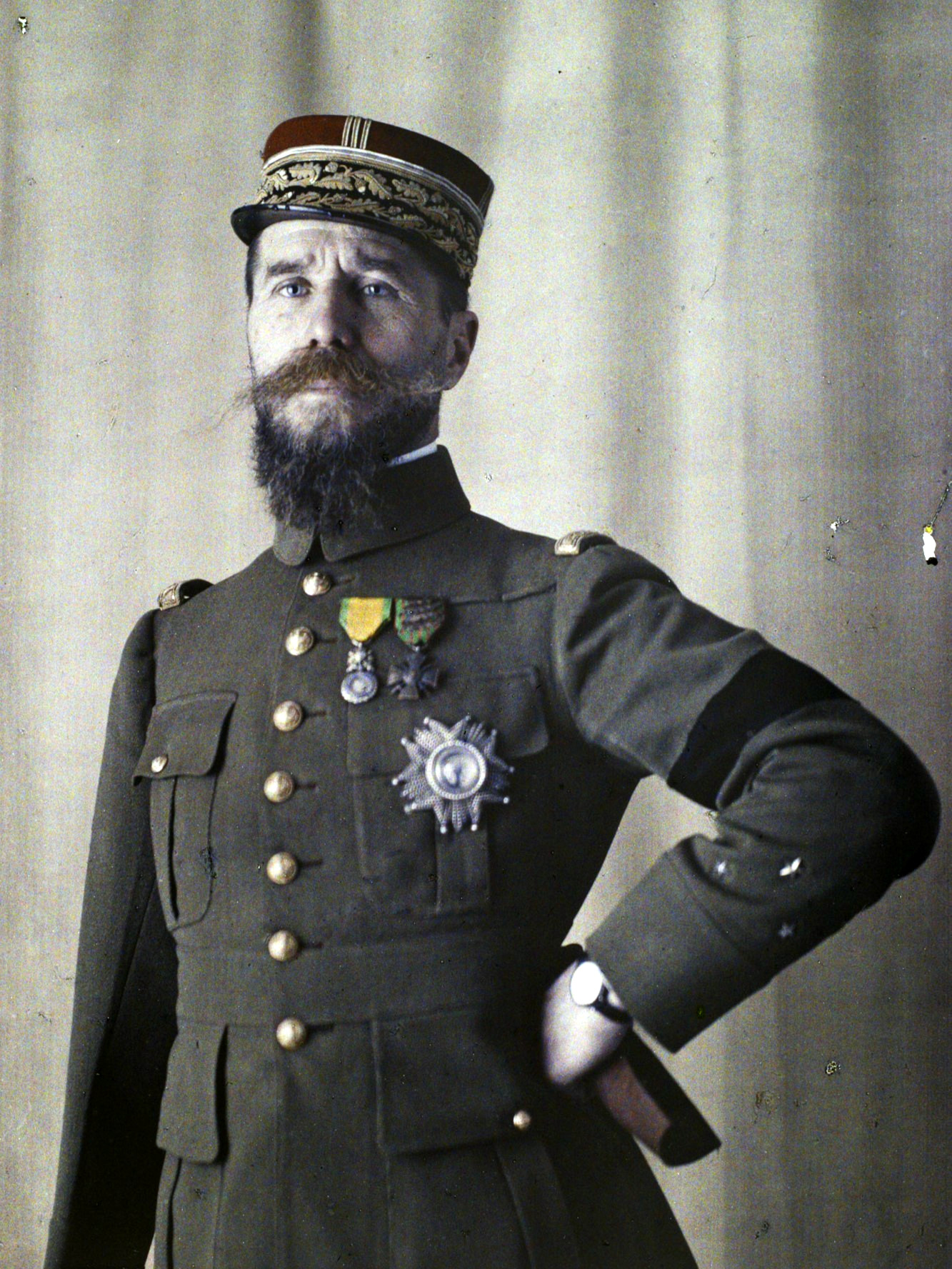
- Autochrome portrait by Auguste Léon, 1919

Military governor of Paris
- In office 1923–1937
- Preceded by: Pierre Berdoulat
- Succeeded by: Gaston Billotte

High Commissioner of the Levant
- In office 9 October 1919 – 23 November 1922
- Preceded by: Office established
- Succeeded by: Robert de Caix (acting)

Personal details
- Born: Henri Joseph Eugène Gouraud; 17 November 1867 96 Rue de Grenelle, Paris, France
- Died: 16 September 1946 (aged 78) Paris, Provisional Government of the French Republic
- Awards: Grand Cross of the Legion of Honour

Military service
- Allegiance: France
- Branch/service: French Army
- Years of service: 1890–1937
- Rank: Général d'armée
- Commands: 10th Infantry Division; Fourth Army
- Battles/wars: Mandingo Wars; World War I Franco-Turkish War; Franco-Syrian War

Henri Joseph Eugène Gouraud (French pronunciation: [ɑ̃ʁi ɡuʁo]; 17 November 1867 – 16 September 1946) was a French army general. He played a central role in the colonization of French Africa and the Levant. During World War I, he fought in major battles such as those of the Argonne, the Dardanelles, and Champagne. An important figure in the aftermath of the Ottoman Empire, he served as High Commissioner of the French Republic in the Levant from 1919 to 1922, during which he led military campaigns in Cilicia and Syria.

Affiliated with the colonial party, Gouraud was an active colonizer, influenced by figures such as Joseph Gallieni and Hubert Lyautey. His name remains closely associated with the conquest of Sudan, Mauritania, Chad, and Morocco, and his arrest of Samory Touré in September 1898 marked a turning point in the French colonization of West Africa. This act brought him to prominence at a time when France sought to overcome the humiliation of the Fashoda Incident.

During World War I, Gouraud distinguished himself by his courage and sacrifice. Seriously wounded in the Dardanelles, where he lost his right arm, he became a symbol of resilience and a national hero. His victory over Ludendorff in the Argonne led to the liberation of Strasbourg, the reconquest of Alsace-Lorraine, and the victory of France.

After the war, as High Commissioner in the Levant, he played a key role in reorganizing the region, leading campaigns in Cilicia and Syria, and redrawing the borders of the Middle East. He is particularly famous for proclaiming the creation of Greater Lebanon in 1920, marking a significant step in French colonial policy.

Back in France, Gouraud continued his military career, becoming Military Governor of Paris from 1923 to 1937. At the end of his career, he embodied a figure of transition, having actively participated in the implementation of various colonial regimes (colony, protectorate, mandate). According to historian Julie d'Andurain, "as an actor and witness of these changes, Henri Gouraud understood that the time of colonies would be succeeded by the time of empires and international organizations". He thus linked with the next generation, that of men like Georges Catroux and Jules Bührer.

His policy of dividing Syria into several small states based on confessional criteria marked a significant step in French colonial policy in the Levant, aiming to divide territories to control them better. Set against a backdrop of imperial rivalries and nationalist tensions, it is still criticized today for its consequences on the stability and unity of the region.

== Early life ==
Henri Gouraud was born at 96 Rue de Grenelle on 17 November 1867, in the 7th arrondissement of Paris to doctor Xavier Gouraud and Marie Portal, the first of six children. The Gouraud family originally came from Vendée, but had left during the French Revolution for Angers, then Paris. Gouraud was educated at home and at the Collège Stanislas de Paris. His decision for a military career was, like many Frenchmen of his generation, motivated by the French defeat in the Franco-Prussian War.

Gouraud entered the Saint Cyr Military Academy in 1888 as part of the "Grand Triomphe" promotion, a well-chosen name as it included sixty future generals. He graduated in 1890 and joined the Troupes de marine. He expected to be posted overseas as the Troupes de marine served in the French colonial empire, but his father objected because he feared that the marines would be a bad influence on his son. Gouraud respected his father's wish and was instead posted to the 21st Foot Chasseur Regiment at Montbéliard.

== Africa ==
Henri Gouraud was assigned in 1894 to French Sudan. He developed a reputation as an effective if lucky commander. In 1898, he was ordered to head one of a number of units fighting Samori, the resistance leader who had been fighting the French for more than a decade. Driven into the highlands south of Niger River valley by a series of previous defeats, Samori's forces were defeated within the year. On 29 September 1898, Gouraud's unit stumbled upon Samori's encampment and captured him. More importantly, it marked the end of the last large state opposing French colonialism in the West.

The capture of Samori made Henri Gouraud a celebrated figure in France, at the same time as nationalist feeling in the country was heightened by the Fashoda Incident. The young captain was feted in the highest political circles of Paris, where he was introduced to powerful businessmen and politicians with interests in the colonial project. Among them were Auguste d'Arenberg and Eugène Étienne, future founders of what was called the "parti colonial". Thanks to the patronage of the "parti colonial", Henri Gouraud pursued a career across French Africa for the next fifteen years, with postings in Niger, Chad and Mauritania. In 1907, he was promoted to colonel and commissaire du Gouvernement général of Mauritania, where he led a campaign against Bedouin tribes who threatened transport between the colonies of Morocco and French West Africa.

In 1911, after attending the centre des Hautes études militaires in France, colonel Gouraud was stationed in Morocco, where he was promoted to général de brigade, serving under Lyautey. He was placed in command of the Fez military region, and from 1914 to 1915 in command of all French colonial troops in western Morocco.

== World War I ==
In mid-1915 he served as commander of the French Expeditionary Corps that was committed to the Dardanelles campaign. He was wounded on 30 June, and subsequently lost his right arm.

From December 1915 to December 1916 and from June 1917 until the end of the war he commanded the Fourth Army on the Western Front, where he gained distinction for his use of elastic defense during the Second Battle of the Marne in July 1918.

On 22 November 1918 he entered the city of Strasbourg, overthrowing the Soviet government that had been proclaimed there on 11 November 1918.

== French Mandate of Syria and Lebanon ==
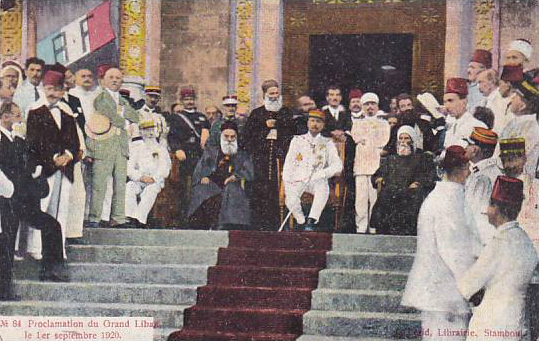
Proclamation of the state of Greater Lebanon, Gouraud with Grand Mufti of Beirut Sheikh Mustafa Naja, and on his right is the Maronite Patriarch Elias Peter Hoayek.

After the war, Gouraud served from 1919 to 1922 as representative of the French Government in the Middle East and commander of the French Army of the Levant. As commander of French forces during the Franco-Turkish War, he presided over the creation of the French Mandates in Syria and Lebanon. Following the implementation of the 1916 Sykes-Picot Agreement, which divided the occupied remnants of the Ottoman Empire between France and Britain, Gouraud was commander of forces sent to enforce the French division of the Levant.

Between 20 January and 10 February 1920, Gouraud's troops were moved north to support forces in the Franco-Turkish War. Gouraud directed the suppression of a rising of Turkish National Forces at the Battle of Marash which led to the withdrawal of French troops back to Syria.

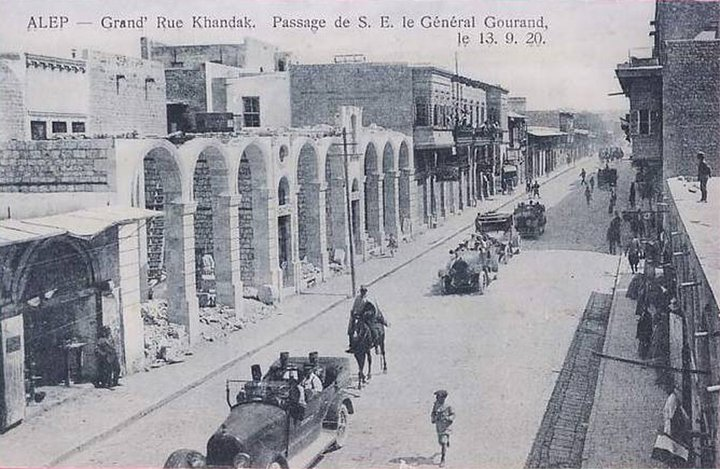
General Gouraud crossing through al-Khandaq street on 13 September 1920, Aleppo

There, Gouraud's ongoing attempt to control King Faisal came to a head. Gouraud led French forces which crushed King Faisal's short-lived monarchy at the Battle of Maysalun on 23 July 1920, occupied Damascus, defeated the forces of the Syrian Revolution and established the French Mandate of Syria. These territories were reorganised a number of times by Gouraud's decrees, the most famous being the creation of the State of Greater Lebanon on 1 September 1920. Gouraud became the French High Commissioner in Syria and Lebanon, effective head of the colonial government there.

He is remembered in the Levant primarily for this role, and for an apocryphal anecdote. Following the Battle of Maysalun, Gouraud allegedly went to the Tomb of Saladin, kicked it, and said: “Awake, Saladin. We have returned. My presence here consecrates the victory of the Cross over the Crescent." The quote is sometimes attributed to Mariano Goybet instead of Gouraud.

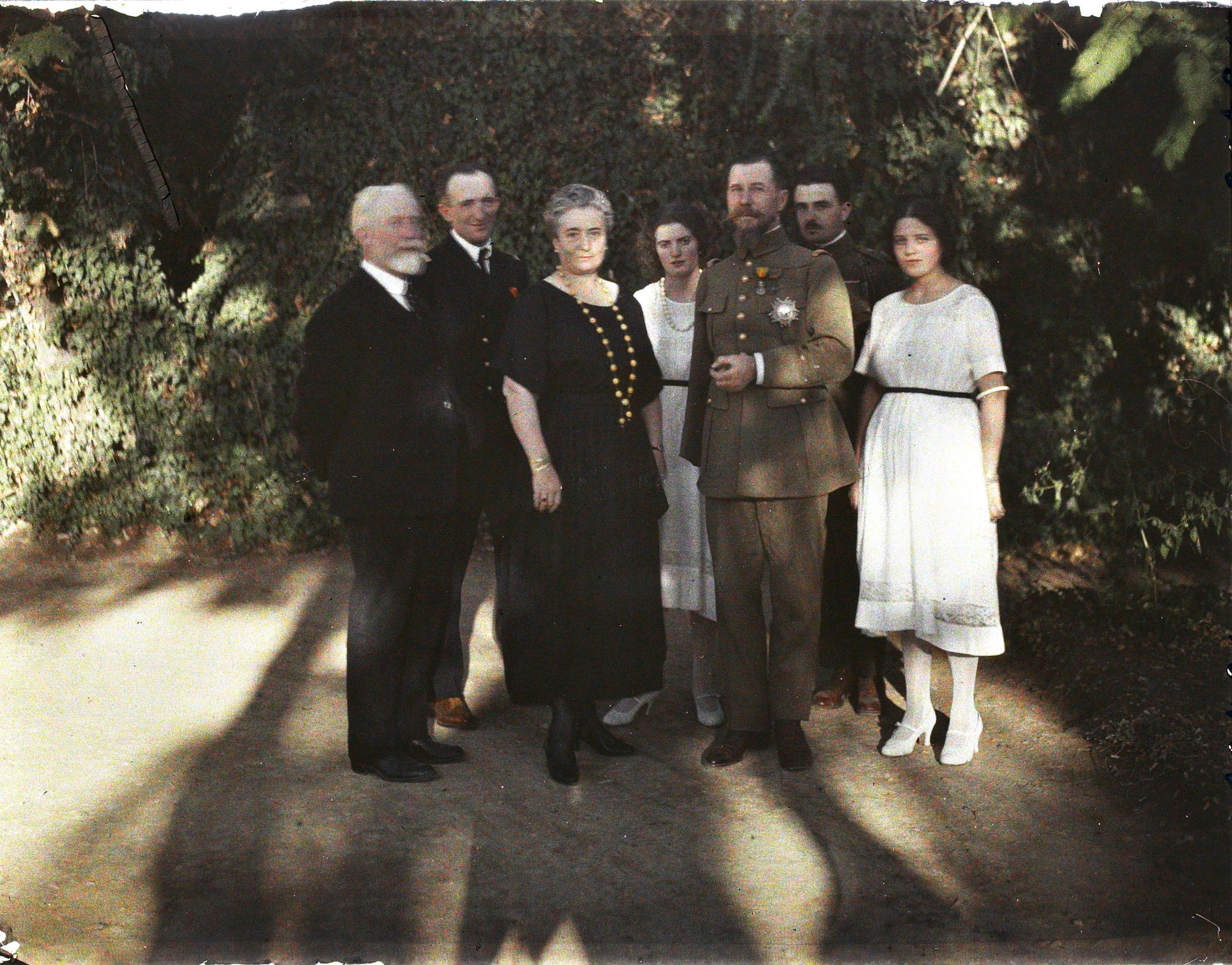
Autochrome of Gouraud in Syria by Frédéric Gadmer, 1921

Gouraud's administration in Syria borrowed much from his time as a young man working under Lyautey in Morocco, where colonial policy focused on control of the country through manipulation of tribes, Sufis, and the rural Berber populations. In Syria, this took the form of separate administrations for Druze and Alawite communities, with the aim of dividing their interests from those of urban nationalists.

Particularly unpopular following the French taking of Damascus, the Syrian nationalist Adham Khanjar of Southern Lebanon staged a failed attempt on Gouraud's life on 23 June 1921.

== Later years ==
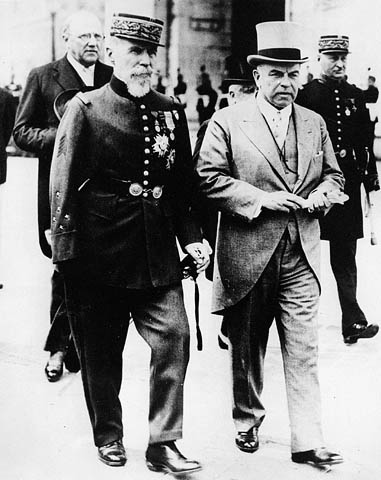
Gouraud, as Military Governor of Paris, escorting Canadian prime minister William Lyon Mackenzie King to the Tomb of the Unknown Soldier at the Arc de Triomphe.

In 1923, he returned to France, where he was the Military Governor of Paris from 1923 to 1937. He also served on the Supreme Allied War Council from 1927 until his retirement in 1937. General Gouraud died in Paris in 1946. In 1948 his remains were interred at the ossuary at Navarin Farm, built atop the site of the Second Battle of Champagne, which he had inaugurated in 1924.

== Decorations ==
- Légion d'honneur
  - Knight (18 October 1898)
  - Officer (31 May 1904)
  - Commander (11 July 1909)
  - Grand Officer (10 August 1914)
  - Grand Cross (28 December 1918)
- Médaille militaire (10 July 1915)
- Honorary Knight Grand Cross of the Order of St Michael and St George (United Kingdom, 27 August 1915)
- Croix de guerre 1914–1918
- Médaille Interalliée de la Victoire
- Médaille commémorative de la guerre 1914–1918
- Médaille commémorative de Syrie-Cilicie
- Médaille Coloniale with "Sénégal et Soudan" "Maroc" "Mauritanie et Adrar" bars
- Grand Cross of the Order of Ouissam Alaouite (Morocco)
- Grand Cordon of the Order of Saints Maurice and Lazarus (Italy)
- Commander of the Nicham El-Anouar (Tunisia)
- Commander of the Nichan Iftikhar (Tunisia)
- Distinguished Service Medal (USA)
- Order of the White Lion (Czechoslovakia)
- Order of Karađorđe's Star with swords (Serbia)

== Published works ==
La Pacification de Mauritanie. Journal des marches et opérations de la colonne de l'Adrar, 1910; Souvenirs d'un Africain, Au Soudan, 1939; Zinder-Tchad. Souvenirs d'un Africain, 1944; Mauritanie-Adrar, 1945; Au Maroc, 1946

== Legacy ==
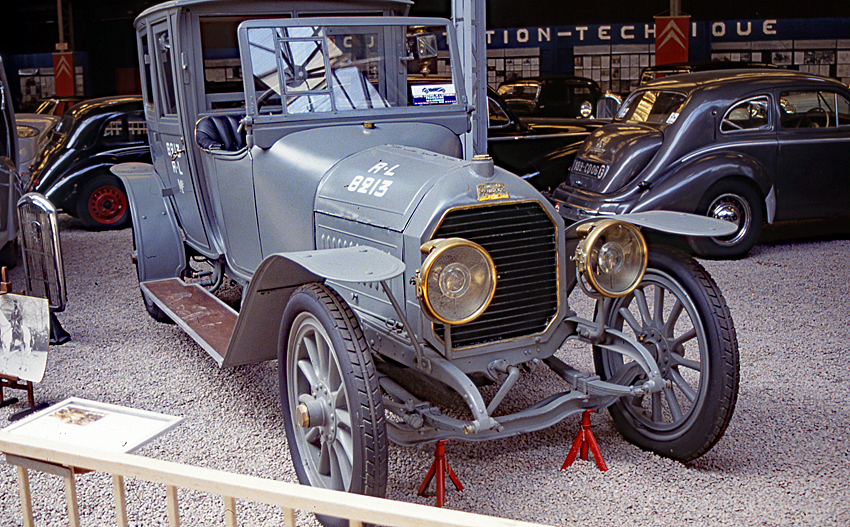
1912 Peugeot 146, Gen. Gouraud's staff car

- Paris has a Place du Général-Gouraud in the 7th arrondissement.
- A commemorative statue to Général Gouraud stands in a garden next to Les Invalides.
- A massive cedar tree near the town of Ifrane in the Atlas Mountains of Morocco was named for the General; the Gouraud Cedar is considered to be over 800 years old, and was "discovered" by Gouraud's troops during the French campaign against anti-colonial resistance on the Timahdite Plateau in the years 1917–19. Moreover, the Cèdre Gouraud Forest in the Middle Atlas Mountain Range is named for Gouraud; this forest is one of the few remaining habitats of the endangered Barbary macaque.
- Rue Gouraud in the Achrafieh district of Beirut is named for the General.
