= Umm =

Umm (أمّ) means mother in Arabic. It is a common Arabic feminine given name and generic prefix for Semitic place names. It may refer to:

== Places ==
=== Bahrain ===
- Ain Umm Sujoor, an archaeological site
- Umm an Nasan, an island
- Umm as Sabaan, an islet

=== Egypt ===
- Umm Kulthum Museum, in Old Cairo
- Umm Naggat mine
- Umm El Qa'ab, a necropolis
- Zawyet Umm El Rakham, an archaeological site

=== Iraq ===
- Umm al Binni lake
- Umm Qasr, a port city
  - Umm Qasr Port

=== Israel ===
- Umm Batin, a village
- Umm al-Fahm, a city
- Shibli–Umm al-Ghanam, a town
- Umm al-Hiran, a village
- Umm al-Qutuf, a village

=== Jordan ===
- Umm al Birak, a town
- Jabal Umm Fruth Bridge
- Jabal Umm ad Dami, a mountain
- Mount Umm Daraj
- Umm el-Jimal, a village
- Umm al Kundum, a town
- Umm Qais, a town
- Umm al Qanafidh, a town
- Umm Shujayrah al Gharbiyah, a town
- Umm Zuwaytinah, a town

=== Kuwait ===
- Umm al Maradim Island
- Umm an Namil Island, Kuwait Bay, Persian Gulf

=== Libya ===
- Umm al Ahrar, an oasis
- Qabr Umm al Hishah, an oasis
- Umm al Rizam, a town

=== Palestine ===
- Umm 'Ajra, a depopulated village
- Tell Umm el-'Amr, a monastery
- Khirbat Umm Burj, a village
- Umm al-Faraj, a depopulated village
- Umm Kalkha, a depopulated village
- Umm al-Khair, Hebron, a village
- Umm al-Kilab, a village
- Umm Khalid, a depopulated village
- Bayt Umm al-Mays, a depopulated village
- Umm al-Nasr Mosque in Beit Hanoun, Gaza Strip
- Umm ar-Rihan, a village
- Khirbat Umm Sabuna, a depopulated village
- Umm Salamuna, a village
- Umm ash Shauf, a depopulated village
- Umm al-Tut, a village
- Umm az-Zinat, a depopulated village

=== Qatar ===
- Umm Bab, a settlement
- Umm Birka, a settlement
- Umm al Ghaylam, a settlement
- Umm Ghuwailina, a settlement
- Umm al Hawa'ir, a settlement
- Umm al Kilab, a settlement
- Umm Lekhba, a settlement
- Umm Al Maa, an archaeological site
- Umm Al Qahab, a settlement
- Umm Qarn, a settlement
- Umm al Qubur, an abandoned village
- Umm Salal, a municipality
  - Umm Salal Mohammed, the seat of the municipality Umm Salal
  - Umm Salal Ali, a village
- Umm Tais National Park

=== Saudi Arabia ===
- Umm Al-Hamam, a village
- Jabal Umm Hayfā', a mountain
- Jabal Umm al Ru'us, a town

=== Sudan ===
- Umm Badr, a town
- Umm Bel, a town
- Umm Dam, a town
- Umm Ruwaba, a city
- Umm Ruweim, an archaeological ruin site

=== Syria ===
- Umm al-'Adam, a village
- Umm al-Dawali, a village
- Umm Elgar, a village
- Umm Elkhalayel, a village
- Umm Ghargan, a village
- Maarat Umm Hawsh, a village
- Umm Haratayn (disambiguation), multiple villages
- Umm Jabab, a village
- Umm Jalal, a village
- Hawayiz Umm Jurn, a village
- Umm al-Keif, a village
- Umm el-Marra, an ancient city
- Umm Mweilat Janubiyah, a village
- Umm Nir, a village
- Umm al-Qasab, a village
- Umm al Quşayr (disambiguation), multiple village
- Umm Rish, a village
- Umm Sehrij, a village
- Umm Tini, a village
- Umm al-Tuyour, Hama Governorate, a village
- Umm Waghfah, a village
- Umm Walad, a town
- Umm al-Zaytun, a village
- Umm Zaytuna, a village

=== United Arab Emirates ===
- Umm Hurair, a locality in Dubai
- Umm Ramool, a locality in Dubai
- Umm Suqeim, a locality in Dubai
- Umm Al Sheif, a locality in Dubai
- Umm al-Nar Culture, of 2600-2000 BC
- Umm al-Quwain, one of the seven emirates

=== Yemen ===
- `Arqub Umm Kubayr, a village
- Bayt Umm Jalli, a village
- Jawf Umm Maqbabah, a village
- Qaryat Husayn Umm Muhammad, a village

== Other uses ==
- Umm (given name)
- Umm Dreiga, an oasis town in Western Sahara
- Umm al-Barahin, a foundational primer in the Ash'ari school of Sunni thought

== See also ==
- UMM (disambiguation)
- Umm al-Amad (disambiguation)
- Umm al-Qura (disambiguation)
