= Talal Abu Zarifa =

Palestinian communist militant (1960–2024)

- طلال أبو ظريفة

Personal details
- Born: 13 May 1960 Abasan al-Kabira, All-Palestine Protectorate, United Arab Republic (now in the Gaza Strip)
- Died: 13 May 2024 (aged 64) Sabra, Gaza, Palestine
- Party: Democratic Front for the Liberation of Palestine
- Education: University of Algiers 1

Military service
- Allegiance: Palestinian Joint Operations Room

Talal Abu Zarifa (Arabic: طلال أبو ظريفة; 13 May 1960 – 13 May 2024) was a Palestinian communist militant and politician.

== Biography ==
Abu Zarifa was born in the city of Abasan al-Kabira in Khan Yunis Governorate, in the southeast of the Gaza Strip in 1960, at which time Egypt held sway over the territory.

He belonged to the Democratic Front for the Liberation of Palestine when he was a student at the University of Algiers 1 in 1977, and was a member of the General Union of Palestinian Students conference in 1979. Later, in 1983, he obtained a bachelor's degree in biology from the University of Algiers, College of Science. He worked in the Directorate of the Ministry of Agriculture, Khan Yunis Governorate, and during the Second Intifada and the invasion of Abasan al-Kabira in 2003, the IDF blew his house up. Abu Zarifa said about the formation of the Palestinian Joint Operations Room in 2018:

"The resistance’s honourable response in the Joint Operations Room is consolidating the meanings of national unity."

== Death ==
Talal Abu Zarifa was killed in an Israeli airstrike in the Al-Sabra neighborhood, south of Gaza City, on 13 May 2024 during the Gaza war. Some sources claim that he was targeted for assassination. Palestinian newspaper Felesteen reported that he was killed by an airstrike on his house. Israeli military whistleblowers told Israeli journalist Yuval Abraham that the IDF had been systematically killing members of Hamas and their suspected associates by bombing their family homes in the Gaza Strip.
