= Balqasah =

Balqasah بلقسة
- Village
- Location in Syria
- Coordinates: 34°44′27″N 36°29′41″E
- Country: Syria
- Governorate: Homs
- District: Homs
- Subdistrict: Khirbet Tin Nur

Population (2004)
  - Total: 2,078
- Time zone: UTC+3 (AST)

Balqasah (Arabic: بلقسة, also spelled Belukseh) is a village in northern Syria located northwest of Homs in the Homs Governorate. According to the Syria Central Bureau of Statistics, Balqasah had a population of 2,078 in the 2004 census, making it the third largest locality in the subdistrict of Khirbet Tin Nur. Its inhabitants are predominantly Alawites.

== Bibliography ==
- Robinson, E.; Smith, E. (1841). Biblical Researches in Palestine, Mount Sinai and Arabia Petraea: A Journal of Travels in the year 1838. Vol. 3. Boston: Crocker & Brewster.
