= Al-Mujaidel =

Al-Mujaidel المجيدل Al-Mjaidel
- Village
- Location in Syria
- Coordinates: 32°57′50″N 36°15′17″E
- PAL: 267/263
- Country: Syria
- Governorate: Daraa
- District: Izraa
- Subdistrict: Izraa

Population (2004 census)
  - Total: 598

Al-Mujaidel (Arabic: المجيدل) is a village in southern Syria, administratively part of the Izraa District in the Daraa Governorate. According to the Syria Central Bureau of Statistics (CBS), Al-Mujaidel had a population of 598 in the 2004 census. Its inhabitants are predominantly Sunni Muslim.

== History ==
In 1596, the village appeared in the Ottoman tax registers as Majdal, part of the nahiya of Bani Kilab in the Hauran Sanjak. At the time, it had an entirely Muslim population consisting of 14 households and 5 bachelors. The villagers paid a fixed tax rate of 40% on various agricultural products, including wheat (4,200 akçe), barley (540 a.), summer crops (840 a.), and livestock such as goats and beehives (110 a.). The total tax amounted to 5,690 akçe, of which 14/24 of the revenue went to a waqf.

In 1838, el-Mujeidil was described as a village “in the Luhf, west of the Lejah” with a Muslim population.

== Religious buildings ==
- Usama ibn Zayd Mosque

== Bibliography ==
- Hütteroth, W.-D.; Abdulfattah, K. (1977). Historical Geography of Palestine, Transjordan and Southern Syria in the Late 16th Century. Erlanger Geographische Arbeiten, Sonderband 5. Erlangen, Germany: Vorstand der Fränkischen Geographischen Gesellschaft. ISBN 3-920405-41-2.
- Robinson, E.; Smith, E. (1841). Biblical Researches in Palestine, Mount Sinai and Arabia Petraea: A Journal of Travels in the year 1838. Vol. 3. Boston: Crocker & Brewster.
