= Umm al Amad =

Umm al-Amad (Arabic: أم العمد) may refer to:

- Umm al-Amad, Al-Mukharram, a village in Homs Governorate, Syria
- Umm al-Amad, Hama, a village in Hama District, Hama Governorate, Syria
- Umm al-Amad, Salamiyah, a village in Salamiyah District, Hama Governorate, Syria
- Alonei Abba, formerly called Umm el Amad
- Umm al-Amad, Lebanon, an archaeological site
- Umm Al Amad (Qatar), a village in Umm Salal Municipality, Qatar
- Umm al Amad, Jerusalem, an archaeological site
