= An-Najih =

An-Najih النجيح
- Village
- Location in Syria
- Coordinates: 32°55′46″N 36°15′01″E
- PAL: 267/260
- Country: Syria
- Governorate: Daraa
- District: Izraa
- Subdistrict: Izraa

Population (2004 census)
  - Total: 603

An-Najih (Arabic: النجيح) is a village in southern Syria, administratively part of the Izraa District in the Daraa Governorate. According to the Syria Central Bureau of Statistics (CBS), An-Najih had a population of 603 in the 2004 census. Its inhabitants are predominantly Sunni Muslims.

== History ==
In 1596 it appeared in the Ottoman tax registers as Nujaym (Nujayj). part of the nahiya (subdistrict) of Bani Kilab in Hauran Sanjak. It had an entirely Muslim population consisting of 25 households and 14 bachelors. The villagers paid a fixed tax-rate of 40% on wheat (5500 a.), barley (1260 a.), summer crops (190 a.), goats and/or beehives (300 a.), in addition to "occasional revenues" (350 a.); a total of 7,650 akçe. Half of the revenue went to a waqf.

In 1838, En-Nujeih was noted as having Muslim inhabitants, and situated "in the Luhf, west of the Lejah".

== Religious buildings ==
- Abu Hurairah Mosque

== Bibliography ==
- Hütteroth, W.-D.; Abdulfattah, K. (1977). Historical Geography of Palestine, Transjordan and Southern Syria in the Late 16th Century. Erlanger Geographische Arbeiten, Sonderband 5. Erlangen, Germany: Vorstand der Fränkischen Geographischen Gesellschaft. ISBN 3-920405-41-2.
- Robinson, E.; Smith, E. (1841). Biblical Researches in Palestine, Mount Sinai and Arabia Petraea: A Journal of Travels in the year 1838. Vol. 3. Boston: Crocker & Brewster.
