= Qiratah, Daraa =

Qiratah قيراطة
- Village
- Location in Syria
- Coordinates: 32°56′48″N 36°16′03″E
- PAL: 269/261
- Country: Syria
- Governorate: Daraa
- District: Izraa
- Subdistrict: Izraa

Population (2004 census)
  - Total: 682

Qiratah (Arabic: قيراطة) is a village in southern Syria, administratively part of the Izraa District in the Daraa Governorate. According to the Syria Central Bureau of Statistics (CBS), Qiratah had a population of 682 in the 2004 census. Its inhabitants are predominantly Sunni Muslims.

== History ==
In 1838, Kiratah was noted as being situated "in the Luhf, west of the Lejah", and having Druze inhabitants.

== Religious buildings ==
- Mosque

== Bibliography ==
- Robinson, E.; Smith, E. (1841). Biblical Researches in Palestine, Mount Sinai and Arabia Petraea: A Journal of Travels in the year 1838. Vol. 3. Boston: Crocker & Brewster.
