= Hamer, Daraa =

Hamer حامر
- Village
- Location in Syria
- Coordinates: 32°56′41″N 36°17′26″E
- PAL: 271/261
- Country: Syria
- Governorate: Daraa
- District: Izraa
- Subdistrict: Izraa

Population (2004 census)
  - Total: 430

Hamer (Arabic: حامر) is a village in southern Syria, administratively part of the Izraa District in the Daraa Governorate. According to the Syria Central Bureau of Statistics (CBS), Hamer had a population of 430 in the 2004 census. Its inhabitants are predominantly Sunni Muslims.

== History ==
In 1838, Hamir was noted as a ruin, situated "in the Luhf, west of the Lejah".

== Religious buildings ==
- Mosque

== Bibliography ==
- Robinson, E.; Smith, E. (1841). Biblical Researches in Palestine, Mount Sinai and Arabia Petraea: A Journal of Travels in the year 1838. Vol. 3. Boston: Crocker & Brewster.
