= Tannunah =

Tannunah تنونة
- Village
- Location in Syria
- Coordinates: 34°45′17″N 36°34′4″E
- Country: Syria
- Governorate: Homs
- District: Homs
- Subdistrict: Khirbet Tin Nur

Population (2004)
  - Total: 882
- Time zone: UTC+2 (EET)
  - Summer (DST): +3

Tannunah (Arabic: تنونة, also spelled Tannoula or Tenuny) is a village in northern Syria located northwest of Homs in the Homs Governorate. According to the Syria Central Bureau of Statistics, Tannunah had a population of 882 in the 2004 census. Its inhabitants are predominantly Alawites.

== Bibliography ==
- Robinson, E.; Smith, E. (1841). Biblical Researches in Palestine, Mount Sinai and Arabia Petraea: A Journal of Travels in the year 1838. Vol. 3. Boston: Crocker & Brewster.
