= Marj al-Qata =

Marj al-Qata مرج القطا
- Village
- Location in Syria
- Coordinates: 34°45′28″N 36°31′47″E
- Country: Syria
- Governorate: Homs
- District: Homs
- Subdistrict: Khirbet Tin Nur

Population (2004)
  - Total: 893
- Time zone: UTC+3 (AST)

Marj al-Qata (Arabic: مرج القطا) is a village in northern Syria located northwest of Homs in the Homs Governorate. According to the Syria Central Bureau of Statistics, Marj al-Qata had a population of 893 in the 2004 census. Its inhabitants are predominantly Turkmen.

== Bibliography ==
- Robinson, E.; Smith, E. (1841). Biblical Researches in Palestine, Mount Sinai and Arabia Petraea: A Journal of Travels in the year 1838. Vol. 3. Boston: Crocker & Brewster.
