= Kunaysah =

Kunaysah كنيسة
- Village
- Location in Syria
- Coordinates: 34°45′39″N 36°29′42″E
- Country: Syria
- Governorate: Homs
- District: Homs
- Subdistrict: Khirbet Tin Nur

Population (2004)
  - Total: 1,504
- Time zone: UTC+3 (AST)

Kunaysah (Arabic: كنيسة, also spelled Knisa) is a village in northern Syria located northwest of Homs in the Homs Governorate. According to the Syria Central Bureau of Statistics, Kunaysah had a population of 1,504 in the 2004 census. The village was noted in 1838 by Eli Smith.

== Bibliography ==
- Robinson, E.; Smith, E. (1841). Biblical Researches in Palestine, Mount Sinai and Arabia Petraea: A Journal of Travels in the year 1838. Vol. 3. Boston: Crocker & Brewster.
