= UMM =

UMM may refer to:

- UN/CEFACT's Modeling Methodology (UMM), a business process modeling methodology of the United Nations
- União Metalo-Mecânica, a metal works factory and former Portuguese automobile manufacturer
- University of Minnesota Morris
- Underground Music Movement, an Italian dance music label, later turned clothing line
- Urban Male Magazine, a Canadian men's magazine
- Umm Kulthum, Egyptian singer
- "Um" or "umm", an instance of speech disfluency
- UMM blocks, Urea-molasses multinutrient blocks
- Arabic word for mother
- University of Maine at Machias, a college in Machias, Maine
- University of Muhammadiyah Malang, a college in Malang, Indonesia
- University of Medicine, Mandalay, a medical institute in Mandalay.
- Unified Markov model

== See also ==
- Umm (disambiguation)
