= Umm al-Qasab =

Umm al-Qasab أم القصب
- Village
- Location in Syria
- Coordinates: 34°45′11″N 36°37′29″E
- Country: Syria
- Governorate: Homs
- District: Homs
- Subdistrict: Khirbet Tin Nur

Population (2004)
  - Total: 904
- Time zone: UTC+2 (EET)
  - Summer (DST): +3

Umm al-Qasab (Arabic: أم القصب, romanized: Umm al-Kāsāb, also spelled Umm al-Kasab) is a village in northern Syria located northwest of Homs in the Homs Governorate. According to the Syria Central Bureau of Statistics, Umm al-Qasab had a population of 904 in the 2004 census. Its inhabitants are predominantly Turkmens.
