= Yesodot =

- Location within Central Israel
- Coordinates: 31°48′52″N 34°51′57″E
- Country: Israel
- District: Central
- Subdistrict: Rehovot
- Council: Nahal Sorek
- Affiliation: Poalei Agudat Yisrael
- Founded: 1948
- Founder: Hungarian and Polish immigrants
- Population (2024): 1,179

Yesodot (Hebrew: יְסוֹדוֹת, lit. 'Foundations') is a Haredi moshav shitufi in central Israel. Located in the Shephelah, it falls under the jurisdiction of Nahal Sorek Regional Council. In 2024 it had a population of 1,179.

== History ==
The village was established at a control point on the Burma Road in 1948 during the Arab–Israeli War on land near the depopulated Palestinian village of Umm Kalkha. The community had been established two years earlier by immigrants from Hungary and Poland.
