= Umm Haratayn =

Umm Haratayn (also spelled Umm Hartein) could refer to the following villages in Syria:

- Umm Haratayn, Hama, in the Hama Governorate
- Umm Haratayn, al-Suwayda, in the al-Suwayda Governorate
