= Abasan al-Saghira =

Town in Khan Yunis Governorate, Gaza Strip

- Municipality type B

Arabic transcription(s)
  - Arabic: عبسان الصغيرة
  - Latin: Abasan al-Jadida (official)
- Location of Abasan al-Saghira within Palestine
- Coordinates: 31°20′25.85″N 34°20′40.57″E
- State: State of Palestine
- Governorate: Khan Yunis

Government
  - Type: Municipality
  - Control: Israel

Population (2017)
  - Total: 9,290

Abasan al-Saghira (Arabic: عبسان الصغيرة) is a Palestinian agricultural town located in the Khan Yunis Governorate of the State of Palestine, in the southern Gaza Strip. It is located 2 km southeast of Khan Yunis. According to the 2017 census conducted by the Palestinian Central Bureau of Statistics, Abasan al-Saghira had a population of 9,290.

== History ==
In 1886, at the end of the Ottoman era, Abasan al-Saghira consisted of about ten huts, with old building stones.

=== British Mandate Period ===
In the 1922 census of Palestine conducted by the British Mandate authorities, Abassan (presumably both Abasan al-Kabira and Abasan al-Saghira) had a population of 695; all Muslims, increasing in the 1931 census (when they were clearly counted together) to 1144, still all Muslim, in 186 houses.

In the 1945 statistics the two Abasans were still counted together, and had a population of 2,230, all Muslims, with 16,084 dunams of land, according to an official land and population survey. Of this, 92 dunams were for plantations and irrigable land, 15,616 used for cereals, while 69 dunams were built-up land.

== Bibliography ==
- Barron, J.B., ed. (1923). Palestine: Report and General Abstracts of the Census of 1922. Government of Palestine.
- Government of Palestine, Department of Statistics (1945). Village Statistics, April, 1945.
- Hadawi, S. (1970). Village Statistics of 1945: A Classification of Land and Area ownership in Palestine. Palestine Liberation Organization Research Center. Archived from the original on 2018-12-08.
- Mills, E., ed. (1932). Census of Palestine 1931. Population of Villages, Towns and Administrative Areas. Jerusalem: Government of Palestine.
- Schumacher, G. (1886). "Researches in Southern Palestine". Quarterly statement - Palestine Exploration Fund. 18: 171–194.
