= Umm al-'Adam =

Umm al'-Adam أُمُّ الْعِظَام Ümmü’l-İzâm
- Village
- Location in Syria
- Coordinates: 34°42′27″N 36°31′23″E
- Country: Syria
- Governorate: Homs
- District: Homs
- Subdistrict: Khirbet Tin Nur

Population (2004)
  - Total: 1,930
- Time zone: UTC+2 (EET)
  - Summer (DST): +3

Umm al-'Adam (Arabic: أُمُّ الْعِظَام, also spelled Ümmü’l-İzâm) is a village in northern Syria located northwest of Homs in the Homs Governorate. According to the Syria Central Bureau of Statistics, Umm al-'Adam had a population of 1,930 in the 2004 census. Its inhabitants are predominantly Alawites.

== Bibliography ==
- Robinson, E.; Smith, E. (1841). Biblical Researches in Palestine, Mount Sinai and Arabia Petraea: A Journal of Travels in the year 1838. Vol. 3. Boston: Crocker & Brewster.
