= Umm Waghfah =

Umm Waghfah أم وغفة Sarspido
- Village
- Location of Umm Waghfah in Syria
- Coordinates: 36°39′47″N 40°17′27″E
- Country: Syria
- Governorate: al-Hasakah
- District: al-Hasakah
- Subdistrict: Tell Tamer
- Time zone: UTC+3 (AST)
- Geocode: n/a

Umm Waghfah (Arabic: أم وغفة), also known as Sarspido (سرسبيدو), is a village near Tell Tamer in western al-Hasakah Governorate, northeastern Syria. Administratively it belongs to the Nahiya Tell Tamer.

The village is inhabited by Assyrians belonging to the Assyrian Church of the East.

== See also ==
- Assyrians in Syria
- List of Assyrian settlements
- Al-Hasakah offensive (February–March 2015)
