= Mount Umm Daraj =

Mountain in Jerash and Ajloun Governorates, Jordan

Mount Umm Al-Daraj
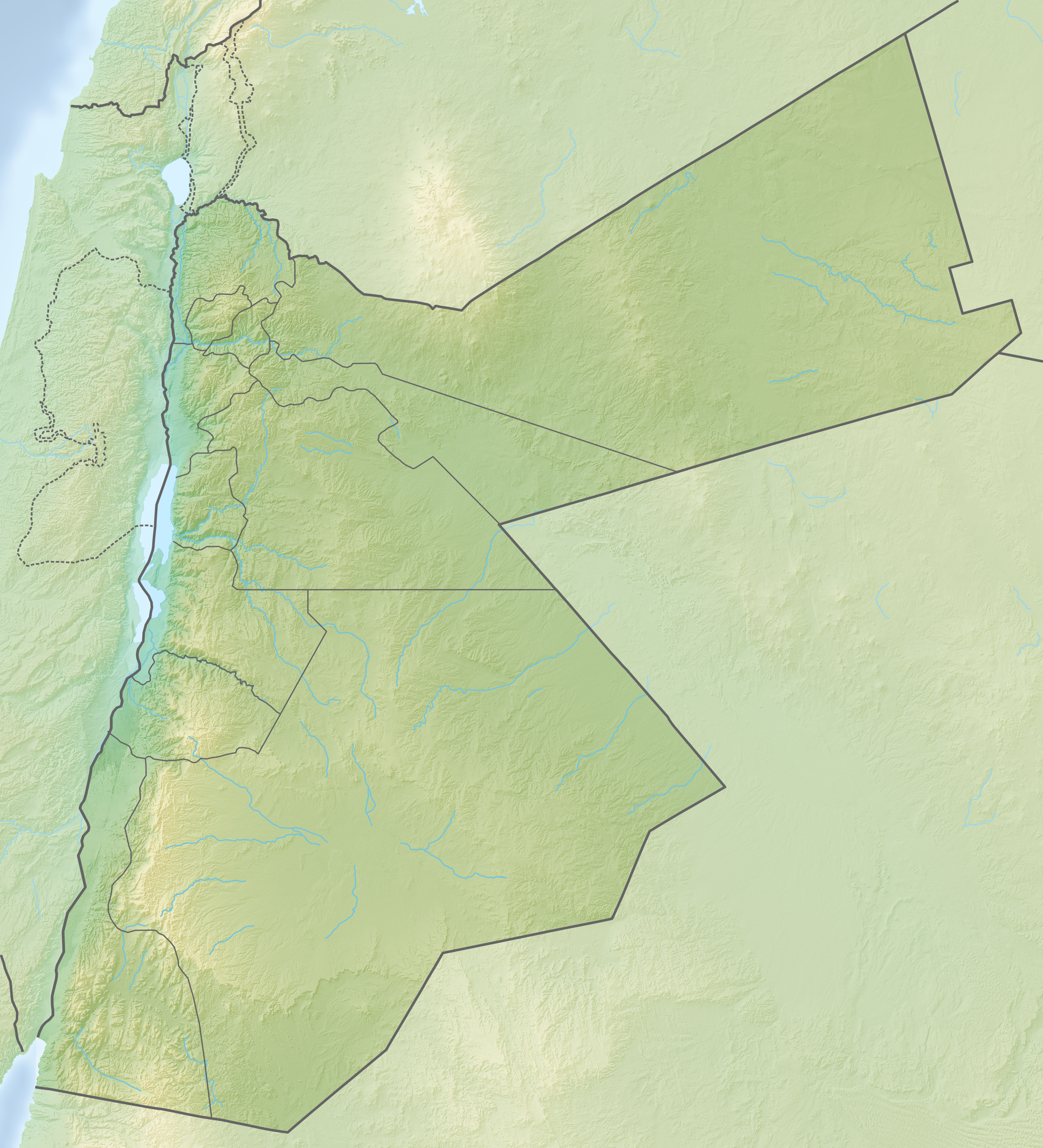
- Location within Jordan

Highest point
- Elevation: 1,247 m (4,091 ft)
- Coordinates: 32.31421°N 35.79826°E

Geography
- Location: Jerash Governorate, Ajloun Governorate

Mount Umm Al-Daraj (Arabic: جبل أم الدرج) is a mountain located in the northern part of Jordan, on the borders between Jerash Governorate and Ajloun Governorate. It reaches a height of 1,247 m (4,091 ft), and considered the highest peak in northern Jordan.

== Geography ==
It is located to the northwest of Jerash and east of Ajloun, between the towns: Souf, Anjara, and Sakib.

== Ecology ==
Several types of trees lives in the mountain, that includes Oak, Maple, Cypress, Carob, and Wild Pistachio. Among the plants growing, there are several species such as Black Iris and Wild Daffodil.
