= Abasan al-Kabira =

- Municipality type A (City)

Arabic transcription(s)
  - Arabic: عبسان الكبيرة
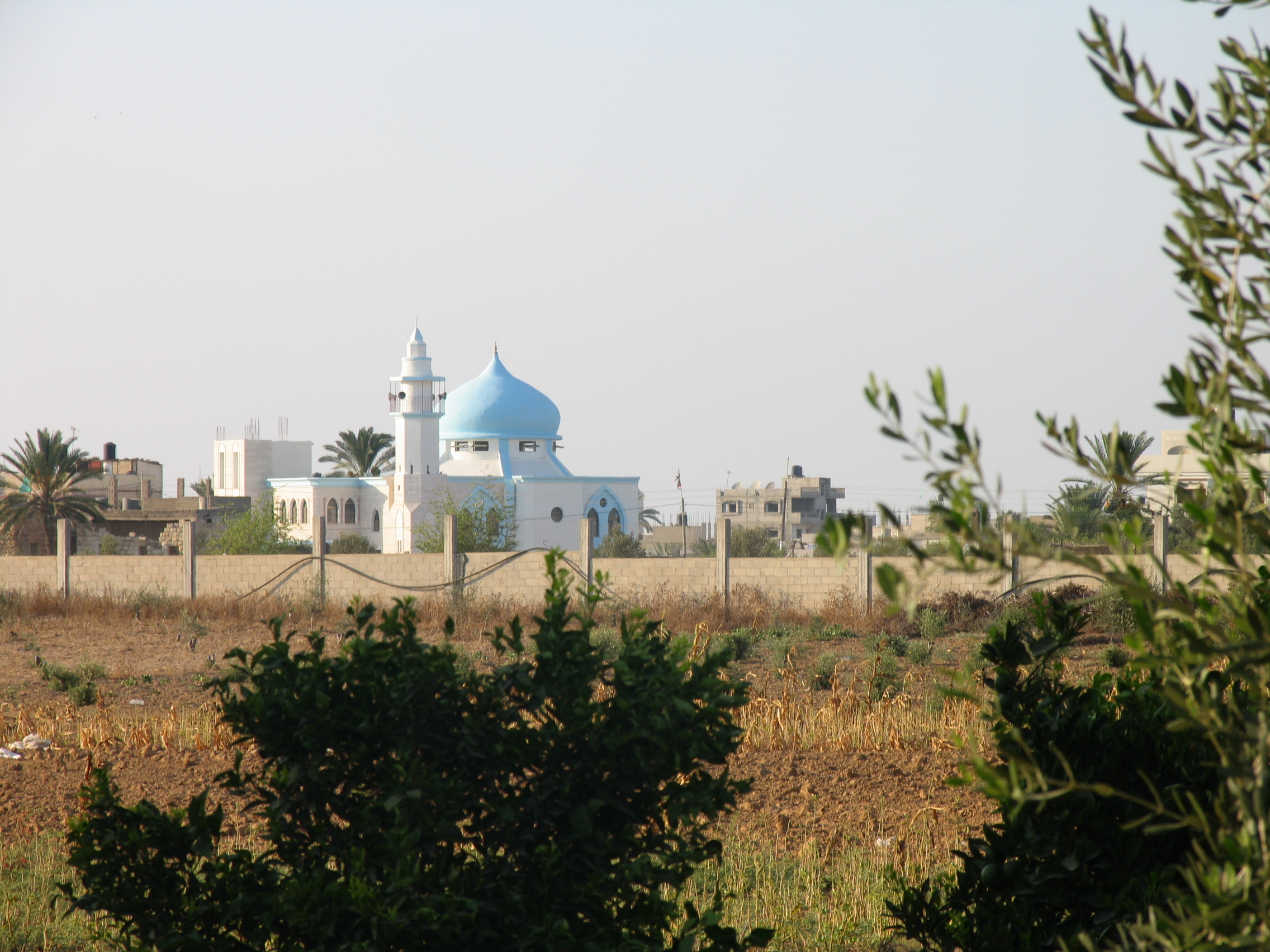
- Abasan al-Kabira

- Location of Abasan al-Kabira within Palestine
- Coordinates: 31°19′24″N 34°20′49″E
- Palestine grid: 087/081
- State: Palestine
- Governorate: Khan Yunis
- Control: Israel

Government
  - Type: City
  - Head of Municipality: Mustafah Alshawaf

Population (2017)
  - Total: 26,767

Abasan al-Kabira (Arabic: عبسان الكبيرة) is a Palestinian city located in the Khan Yunis Governorate of the State of Palestine, in the southern Gaza Strip. It is connected with Khan Yunis city by a local street that crosses other villages like Bani Suheila and Khuza'a. Abasan al-Kabera and the nearby village of Abasan al-Saghira, have in recent years been built up to each other so that they form a larger urban area around Khan Yunis. The town is approximately 75% destroyed as a result of extensive damage sustained during the Gaza War, particularly during Operation Gideon's Chariots.

According to the 2017 census conducted by the Palestinian Central Bureau of Statistics, the city had a population of 26,767. The city primarily depends on agriculture for income. Moreover, small industry is involved with producing construction supplies like bricks and agricultural implements, while some residents work in commerce. The society is strongly influenced by tribal structure so, there are many extended families such as Qudayh in (Arabic: قديح) (the Ashraaf of the Holy Land), Alshawaf, Al-Daghmah, M'ssabih, Abu Yousef, Abu Mustafa, Abu Tair, Abu Dagga, Abu Tabash, Abu Draz, Abu Mutlaq, Abu Hamed, Abu Subha and Abu Amer, Abu Tuaima. The families generally turn to custom to solve disputes amongst themselves.

== History ==
The site of the city was inhabited in the Roman era and under the Byzantine domination (a Greek inscription from 606 CE was founded here), and has several ruins dating from those periods. Furthermore, there are also some archaeological sites that are related to the Islamic era and the period prior to Islam like the "Ibrahim" shrine. Some historians link the people of Abasan to the "Abes family".

Archaeological findings in Abasan al-Kabira include a Greek dedication depicted in a mosaic. The mosaic, measuring approximately 9x4 meters, also displays geometrical and floral patterns, birds, cups filled with fruits, and parts of a plaited band.

=== Ottoman era ===
Abasan appeared in the 1596 Ottoman tax registers as being in the Nahiya of Gaza of the Liwa of Gazza. It had a population of 28 households, all Muslim, who paid taxes on wheat, barley, summer crops, fruit trees, occasional revenues, goats and/or bee hives.

In 1886, Abasan al-Kabera was described as a small flourishing village, built of stone. Four ancient white marble pedestals had been excavated at the village site, three remained.

=== British mandate era ===
In the 1922 census of Palestine conducted by the British Mandate authorities, Abassan (presumably both Abasan al-Kabira and Abasan al-Saghira), located in Gaza Subdistrict, had a population of 695; all Muslims, increasing in the 1931 census to 1144, still all Muslim, in 186 houses.

In the 1945 statistics the two Abasans were still counted together, and had a population of 2,230, all Muslims, with 16,084 dunams of land, according to an official land and population survey. Of this, 92 dunams were for plantations and irrigable land, 15,616 used for cereals, while 69 dunams were built up (urban) land.

=== 1948, and aftermath ===
While under control of Egyptian authorities, Egypt complained to the Mixed Armistice Commission that on the 7 and 14 October 1950 Israeli military forces had shelled and machine-gunned the Arab villages of Abasan al-Kabera and Beit Hanoun in Egyptian controlled territory of the Gaza strip. This action caused the death of seven and the wounding of twenty civilians.

=== Gaza war ===
Between the end of May 2025 and early July the Israeli military caused extensive damage to Abasn al-Kabira through demolition work.
