= Qabr Umm al Hishah =

Desert oasis town in Al Wahat district, Libya

Qabr Umm al Hīshah قبر أم الهيشة
- Town
- Location in Libya
- Coordinates: 30°09′02″N 020°03′15″E
- Country: Libya
- Region: Cyrenaica
- District: Al Wahat
- Elevation: 252 m (827 ft)
- Time zone: UTC+2 (EET)

Qabr Umm al Hishah is a desert oasis town in the Al Wahat District in the Cyrenaica region of northeastern Libya.

Prior to 1983, the town was part of Al Khalji Governorate. After 1983 it was part of the Ajdabiya baladiyah. From 1998 to 2001, it was part of Al Wahat District along with the rest of the old Ajdabiya baladiyah. It became part of the new Ajdabiya District in 2001, but was subsumed back into the enlarged Al Wahat District in 2007.
