= Hawayiz Umm Jurn =

Hawayiz Umm Jurn حوايس أم جرن
- Village
- Location in Syria
- Coordinates: 35°7′17″N 36°53′34″E
- Country: Syria
- Governorate: Hama
- District: Hama
- Subdistrict: Hama

Population (2004)
  - Total: 265
- Time zone: UTC+3 (AST)
- City Qrya Pcode: C3001

Hawayiz Umm Jurn (Arabic: حوايس أم جرن) is a Syrian village located in the Subdistrict of the Hama District in the Hama Governorate. According to the Syria Central Bureau of Statistics (CBS), Hawayiz Umm al-Jurn had a population of 265 in the 2004 census.
