= Umm al-Amad, Salamiyah =

Umm al-Amad أم العمد
- Village
- Location in Syria
- Coordinates: 34°55′55″N 37°3′19″E
- Country: Syria
- Governorate: Hama
- District: Salamiyah
- Subdistrict: Salamiyah

Population (2004)
  - Total: 908
- Time zone: UTC+3 (AST)
- City Qrya Pcode: C3233

Umm al-Amad (Arabic: أم العمد) is a village in central Syria, administratively part of the Salamiyah District of the Hama Governorate. According to the Syria Central Bureau of Statistics (CBS), Umm al-Amad had a population of 908 in the 2004 census.
