= Umm al-Kilab =

Village in southern Gaza Strip

- Municipality type D (Village council)

Arabic transcription(s)
  - Arabic: أُم الكِلاب
  - Latin: Umm el-Kelab (official)
- Interactive map of Umm al-Kilab
- Coordinates: 31°17′44″N 34°17′30″E
- State: State of Palestine
- Governorate: Khan Yunis

Government
  - Type: Village council
  - Control: Israel

Population (2006)
  - Total: 999

Umm al-Kilab (Arabic: أُم الكِلاب, also spelled Umm el-Kelab) is a Palestinian village in the southern Gaza Strip, part of the Khan Yunis Governorate. It is located south of Khan Yunis and east of Rafah, on the border with the Rafah Governorate. According to the Palestinian Central Bureau of Statistics, Umm al-Kilab had a population of 999 in 2006. The village is currently under Israeli control.

In the 1880s Umm al-Kilab was described in the Palestine Exploration Fund's Quarterly Statement as a village that measured about 800 by 600 paces. It had an estimated elevation of 215 feet above sea level. The explorers found sandstone pottery and noted the presence of seven circular cisterns. The surrounding countryside was inhabited by Tarabin Bedouin.

The neighborhood was a frequent target of Israeli bombing during the Israeli invasion of the Gaza Strip.
