= Umm al-Amad, Hama =

Umm al-Amad أم العمد
- Village
- Location in Syria
- Coordinates: 35°2′25″N 36°34′23″E
- Country: Syria
- Governorate: Hama
- District: Hama
- Subdistrict: Hama

Population (2004)
  - Total: 202
- Time zone: UTC+3 (AST)
- City Qrya Pcode: C2974

Umm al-Amad (Arabic: أم العمد) is a Syrian village located in the Subdistrict of the Hama District in the Hama Governorate. According to the Syria Central Bureau of Statistics (CBS), Umm al-Amad had a population of 202 in the 2004 census.

== History ==
In 1838, it was reported as deserted.

== Bibliography ==
- Robinson, E.; Smith, E. (1841). Biblical Researches in Palestine, Mount Sinai and Arabia Petraea: A Journal of Travels in the year 1838. Vol. 3. Boston: Crocker & Brewster.
