= Umm Kalkha =

Umm Kalkha اُم كلخة
- Etymology: Khurbet Umm Kelkhah; The ruin of kelkha (a plant like fennel)
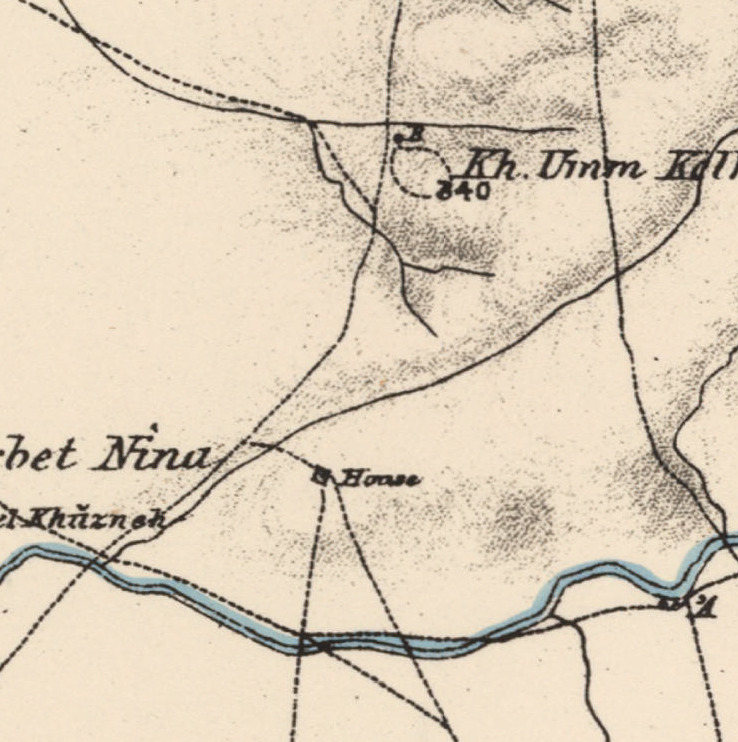
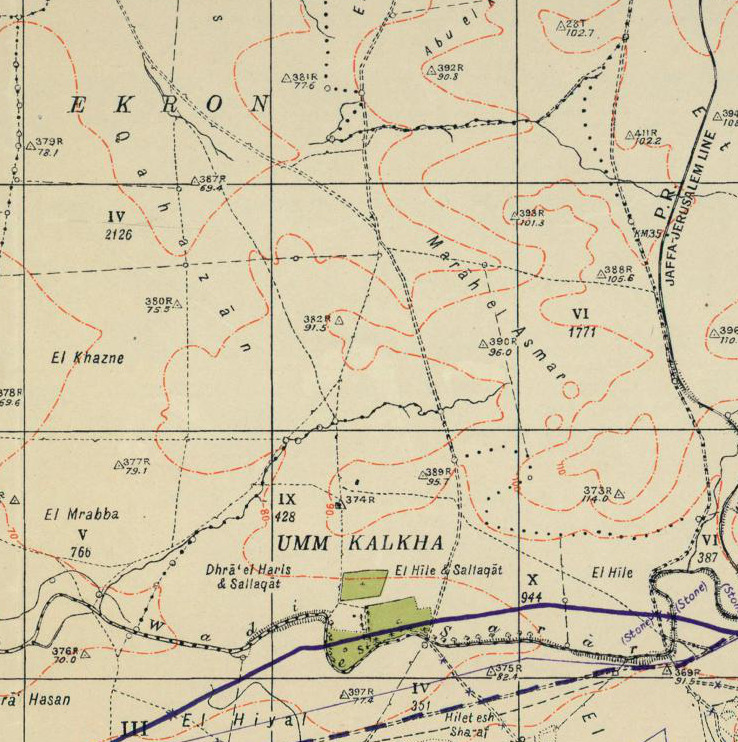
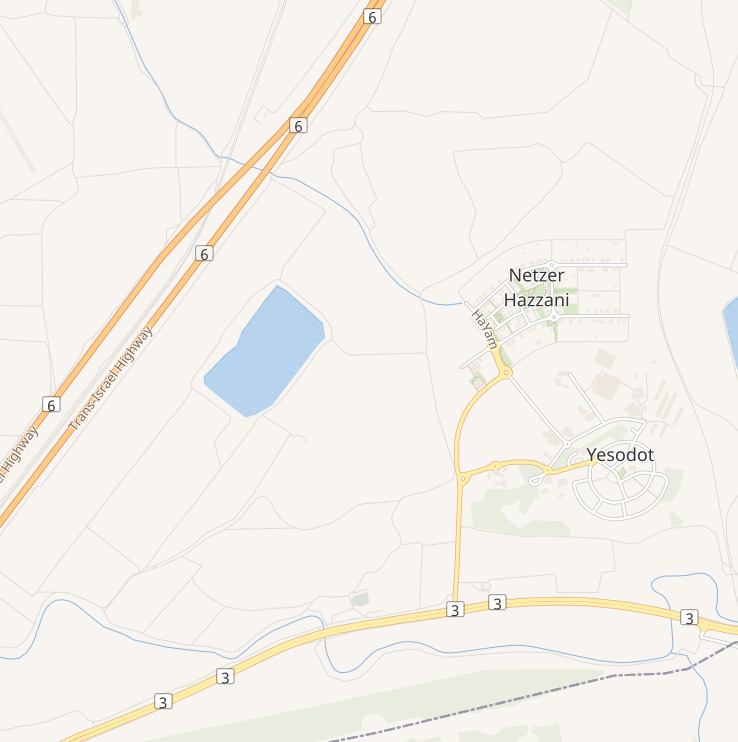
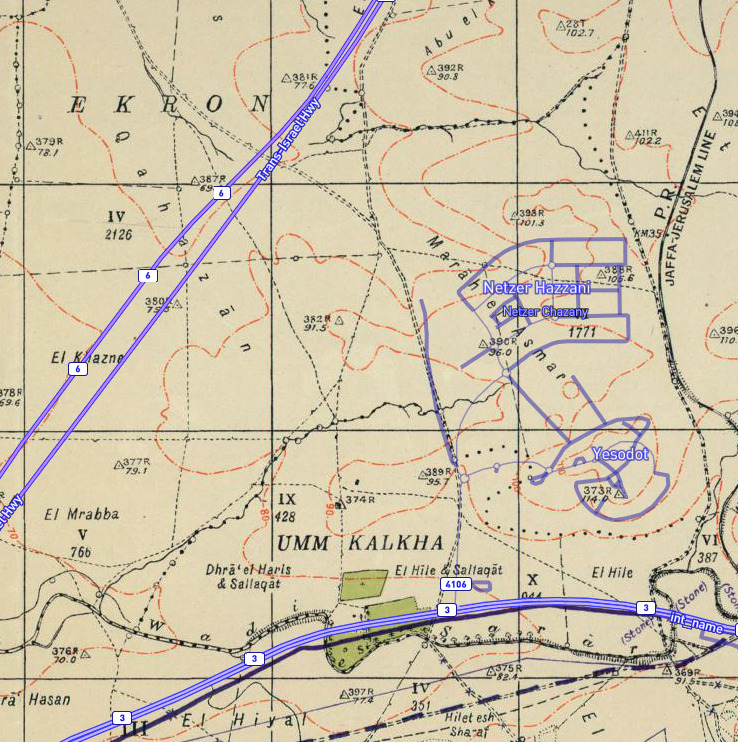
- 1870s map 1940s map modern map 1940s with modern overlay map A series of historical maps of the area around Umm Kalkha (click the buttons)

- Location within Mandatory Palestine
- Coordinates: 31°48′51″N 34°51′57″E
- Palestine grid: 137/135
- Geopolitical entity: Mandatory Palestine
- Subdistrict: Ramle
- Date of depopulation: April 7, 1948

Population (1945)
  - Total: 60
- Current Localities: Yesodot

Umm Kalkha was a small Palestinian village in the Ramle Subdistrict of Mandatory Palestine. It was depopulated during the 1947–48 Civil War in Mandatory Palestine on April 7, 1948, during Operation Nachshon. It was located 12.5 km south of Ramla, situated on the northern banks of Wadi al-Sarar.

== History ==
Umm Kalkha was established during the British Mandate era by the Nashashibi family. Its workers, settling in an area of orchards, came mostly from places near modern Rehovot, including Zarnuqa and al-Qubayba.

=== Ottoman period ===
In 1838, Um Kelkha was noted as a place "in ruins or deserted."

In 1882, the PEF's Survey of Western Palestine (SWP) noted: "There are traces here of an old town, caves, cisterns of rubble, masonry, and pottery fragments."

=== British Mandate era ===
In the 1922 census of Palestine, conducted by the British Mandate authorities, Umm Kalka had a population of 1 Muslim, increasing sharply in the 1931 census 24 Muslims, in 6 houses.

In the 1945 statistics the population was 60, all Muslims, while the total land area was 1,405 dunams, according to an official land and population survey. Of this, 21 dunums of land were used for citrus and bananas, 93 dunums were plantations or irrigated land, 1,119 were for cereals, while a total of 63 dunams were classified as non-cultivable areas.

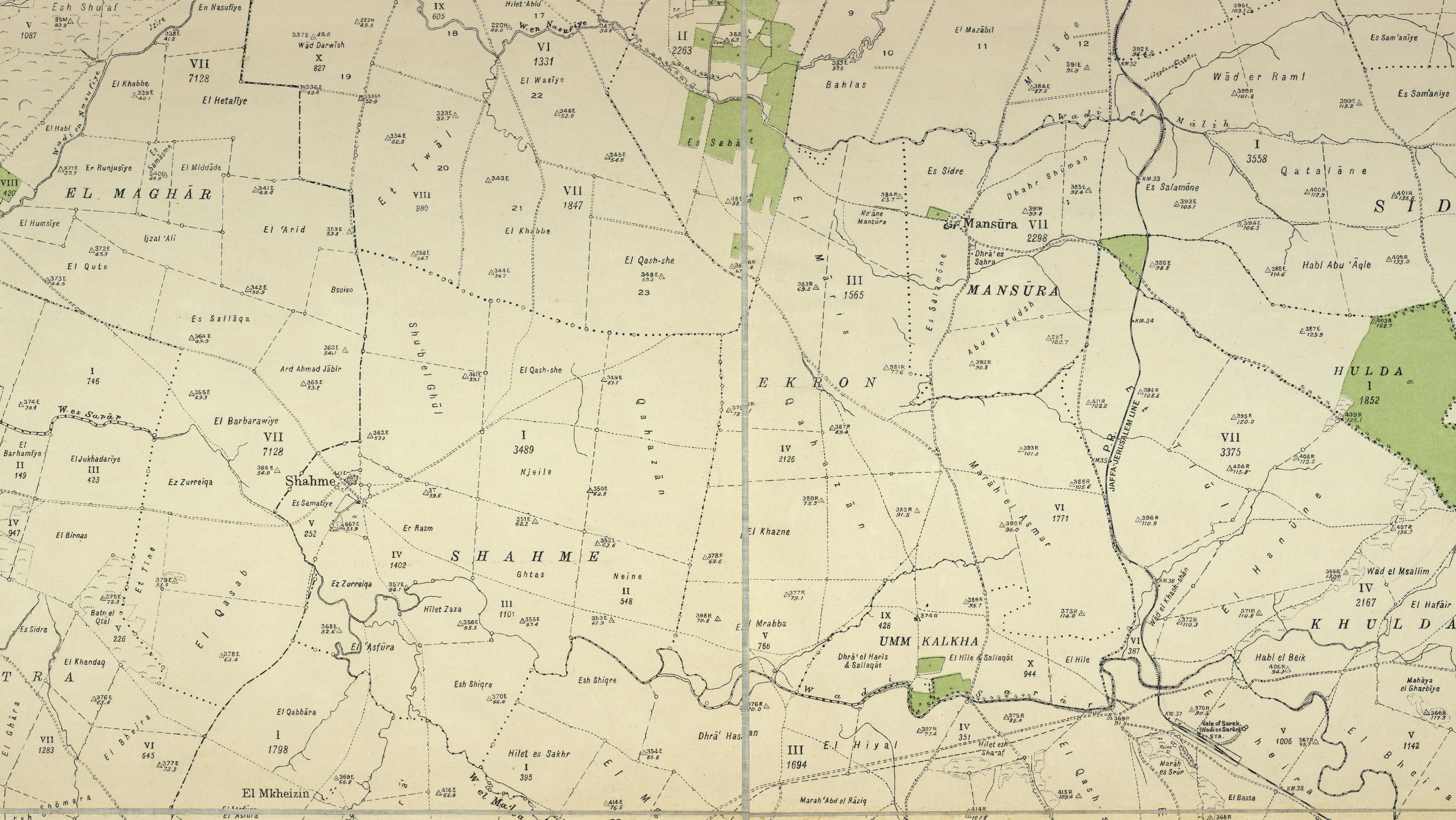
Umm Kalkha 1930 1:20,000

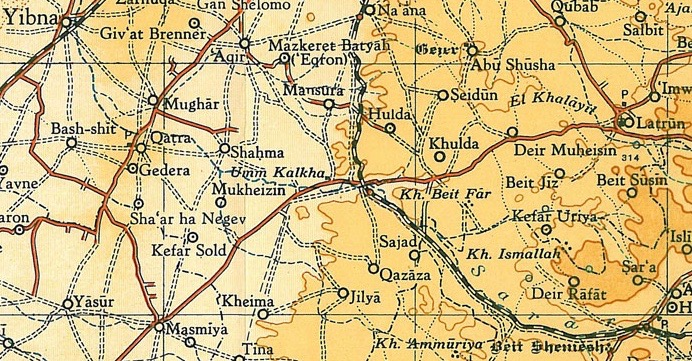
Umm Khalkha 1945 1:250,000

=== 1948, aftermath ===
The Israeli settlement of Yesodot was established on Umm Khalkha land.

== Bibliography ==
- Barron, J. B., ed. (1923). Palestine: Report and General Abstracts of the Census of 1922. Government of Palestine.
- Conder, C.R.; Kitchener, H.H. (1882). The Survey of Western Palestine: Memoirs of the Topography, Orography, Hydrography, and Archaeology. Vol. 2. London: Committee of the Palestine Exploration Fund.
- Department of Statistics (1945). Village Statistics, April, 1945. Government of Palestine.
- Hadawi, S. (1970). Village Statistics of 1945: A Classification of Land and Area ownership in Palestine. Palestine Liberation Organization Research Center.
- Khalidi, W. (1992). All That Remains: The Palestinian Villages Occupied and Depopulated by Israel in 1948. Washington D.C.: Institute for Palestine Studies. ISBN 0-88728-224-5.
- Mills, E., ed. (1932). Census of Palestine 1931. Population of Villages, Towns and Administrative Areas. Jerusalem: Government of Palestine.
- Morris, B. (2004). The Birth of the Palestinian Refugee Problem Revisited. Cambridge University Press. ISBN 978-0-521-00967-6.
- Palmer, E.H. (1881). The Survey of Western Palestine: Arabic and English Name Lists Collected During the Survey by Lieutenants Conder and Kitchener, R. E. Transliterated and Explained by E.H. Palmer. Committee of the Palestine Exploration Fund.
- Robinson, E.; Smith, E. (1841). Biblical Researches in Palestine, Mount Sinai and Arabia Petraea: A Journal of Travels in the year 1838. Vol. 3. Boston: Crocker & Brewster.
