= Khan Yunis Governorate =

Governorate of Palestine

Coordinates: 31.35°N 34.3°E

Khan Yunis Governorate محافظة خان يونس
- Governorate
- Interactive map of Khan Yunis Governorate
- Country: Palestine
- Territory: Gaza Strip

Area
  - Total: 108 km^{2} (42 sq mi)

Population (2017)
  - Total: 270,979
  - Density: 2,510/km^{2} (6,500/sq mi)
- ISO 3166 code: PS-KYS

The Khan Yunis Governorate (Arabic: محافظة خان يونس, romanized: Muḥāfaẓat Ḫān Yūnis) is one of 16 Governorates of Palestine, located in the southern Gaza Strip. Its district capital is Khan Yunis. According to the Palestinian Central Bureau of Statistics, the governorate had a population of 426,056 in mid-2022. Its land area is 69.61% urban, 12.8% rural, and 17.57% comprising the Khan Yunis refugee camp.

== Localities ==
=== Cities ===
- Abasan al-Kabira
- Bani Suheila
- Khan Yunis (Khan Younis/Khan Yunus) (seat)

=== Municipalities ===
- Abasan al-Saghira
- Al-Qarara (Al Qarara)
- Khuzaʽa

=== Village councils ===
- Al-Fukhari (al-Fokari/al-Fukhkhari)
- Qizan an-Najjar (Qizan al-Najar)
- Umm al-Kilab (Umm el-Kelab)
