= Urea-molasses =

Animal feed supplement

Urea-molasses multinutrient blocks may be used as a source of nitrogen and energy for animals. Urea is a nitrogen-based compound produced in the kidneys. It is formed as a side compound during the process of producing protein.

== Overview ==
Urea is not a protein but it contains nitrogen which is capable of being used by the microbial population in the rumen to produce protein. Molasses is the main by-product of sugarcane refining and is a suitable source of energy. Preparing an adequate source of energy and nitrogen under grazing conditions is necessary for grazing animals. Molasses blocks are palatable for the animals and the molasses has the ability to cover undesirable flavors that can be associated with some other chemicals added to the block. This gives the block the ability to contain high levels of unpalatable feedstuffs like urea. Urea is a cheap source of nitrogen, in comparison with other sources, and adding urea to the molasses blocks will reduce the cost of supplementation programs.

== Medicated blocks ==
In tropical countries, inadequate nutrition and gastro-intestinal nematodes are amongst the commonest problems, particularly in sheep and goats. Molasses, urea and other components are used for producing molasses/urea feeds (blocks, pastes or licks). These preparations are a suitable way of supplying degradable protein and fermentable energy to ruminant animals, and they help increase the protein supply to them. Furthermore, medicated feed-supplement blocks have been used in an effort to deliver anthelmintic medication but with varying success. Kioumarsi and others have examined the effects of introducing molasses/mineral feed blocks beside the use of medicated blocks on growth, efficiency, carcass traits, blood metabolites and control of gastro-intestinal nematode infection in grazing goats. With regard to the observed results, the use of urea molasses mineral blocks and medicated urea molasses mineral blocks is recommended.
