= Umm al-Zaytoun =

Umm al-Zaytoun أم الزيتون Umm az-Zeitoun
- Village
- Location in Syria
- Coordinates: 32°54′21″N 36°36′20″E
- PAL: 300/257
- Country: Syria
- Governorate: Suwayda
- District: Shahba
- Subdistrict: Shahba

Population (2004)
  - Total: 1,913
- Time zone: UTC+2 (EET)
  - Summer (DST): UTC+3 (EEST)

Umm al-Zaytoun (Arabic: أم الزيتون, also called Umm az-Zeitoun) is a village in the Suwayda Governorate in southwestern Syria. It is situated along the southeastern edge of the Lajat lava plateau, northwest of the city of Suwayda. Umm al-Zaytoun had a population of 1,913 in the 2004 census. Its inhabitants are predominantly Druze, with a Sunni Muslim Bedouin minority.

== History ==
Umm al-Zaytoun had been abandoned sometime in the middle Ottoman era, but was settled by Druze prior to 1810. It was one of the earliest Druze settlements in the Lejah plateau. The village was controlled by the Bani Amer clan.

In 1838, it was noted as a village, situated "the Luhf, east of the Lejah, i.e. in Wady el-Liwa".

In 1839, Ibrahim Pasha, the Egyptian governor of Syria, sent a conscription expedition of 100 cavalry to subdue the Druze of Hauran. The latter engaged and destroyed Ibrahim Pasha's troops at Umm al-Zaytun. The Egyptian army withdrew from Syria in 1841 and Ottoman rule was restored. Umm al-Zaytun joined the Hauran Druze Rebellion of 1910 was subdued by Ottoman troops commanded by Badr Khan Bey.

== Archaeology ==
Roman Empire-era structures are located in Umm al-Zaytoun. In particular are the ruins of a religious building with a large stone facade and a room with niches suited for statues. The inscription found at the building date to 282 CE and mention and describe the building as a "sacred kalybe". This type of building is relatively unique in Syria, being found only in Umm al-Zaytun and nearby Shaqqa and Hayyat.

== Religious buildings ==
- Maqam Sulayman ibn Dawud (Druze Shrine)

== See also ==
- Druze in Syria

== Bibliography ==
- Butcher, Kevin (2003). Roman Syria and the Near East. Getty Publications.
- Firro, Kais (1992). A History of the Druzes. Vol. 1. BRILL. ISBN 9004094377.
- Murphy, C.C.R. (1921). Soldiers of the Prophet. John Hogg. p. 18.
- Robinson, E.; Smith, E. (1841). Biblical Researches in Palestine, Mount Sinai and Arabia Petraea: A Journal of Travels in the year 1838. Vol. 3. Boston: Crocker & Brewster.
- Socin, A. (1876). Palestine and Syria: Handbook for Travellers. Karl Baedeker.
