= Umm al Quşayr =

Umm al Quşayr or Umm Quşayr may refer to several places in Syria

- Umm Quşayr, As-Suwayda Governorate, a ruin in As-Suwayda Governorate at 32°22′00″N 036°45′00″E
- Umm al Quşayr, As-Suwayda Governorate a ruin in As-Suwayda Governorate at 32°25′00″N 036°53′00″E
- Umm al Quşayr, Al-Hasakah, a village in Al-Hasakah Governorate
