= Umm Haratayn, Suwayda =

Umm Haratayn أم حارتين Umm Hartein
- Village
- Location within Syria
- Coordinates: 33°4′48″N 36°31′26″E
- Country: Syria
- Governorate: Suwayda
- District: Shahba
- Subdistrict: Sawra as-Saghira

Population (2004 census)
  - Total: 574
- Time zone: UTC+2 (EET)
  - Summer (DST): UTC+3 (EEST)

Umm Haratayn (Arabic: أم حارتين, also spelled Umm Hartein) is a village in southern Syria, administratively part of the Suwayda Governorate, located north of Suwayda. Nearby localities include al-Hirak, Khirbet Ghazaleh and Da'el to the west and Umm Walad and Bosra to the south. According to the Syria Central Bureau of Statistics (CBS), Umm Haratayn had a population of 574 in the 2004 census. Its inhabitants are predominantly Druze.

== History ==
Modern-day Umm Haratayn was established by Druze migrants led by the Halabi family between 1867 and 1883. The village is the birthplace of Arab singer Samira Tewfik.

== See also ==
- Druze in Syria

== Bibliography ==
- Firro, Kais (1992). A History of the Druzes. Vol. 1. BRILL. ISBN 9004094377.
