= Khirbet Tin Nur =

Khirbet Tin Nur خربة تين نور Khirbat at-Teen Nour
- Town
- Location in Syria
- Coordinates: 34°42′2″N 36°33′26″E
- Country: Syria
- Governorate: Homs
- District: Homs
- Subdistrict: Khirbet Tin Nur

Government
  - Mayor: Ghada Abdel Karim Qasim
- Elevation: 530 m (1,739 ft)

Population (2004)
  - Total: 2,726
- Time zone: UTC+3 (AST)

Khirbet Tin Nur (Arabic: خربة تين نور, also spelled Khirbat at-Teen Nour) is a town in central Syria, administratively part of the Homs Governorate, west of Homs. Nearby localities include Homs to the east, Qattinah to the southeast, Khirbet al-Sawda to the south, Khirbet Ghazi to the southwest, Khirbet al-Hamam to the west, Umm al-'Adam to the northwest and Khirbet Tin Mahmoud to the north. According to the Central Bureau of Statistics (CBS), Khirbet Tin Nur had a population of 2,726 in the 2004 census. It is the administrative center of a nahiyah ("sub-district") which consists of 43 localities with a combined population of 52,879 in 2004. The town has a total land area of 163 hectares.

The town's name, which is translated as the "Ruins of Nur's Figs," has its origins in the old part of town which was known for its abundance of fig orchards. Most of the trees have since been uprooted and today the old town is covered by shrubbery. The modern town was built southwards of the ruins. In the early 1960s Khirbet Tin Nur's houses were built of basaltic lava stone.

According to Swiss scholar Max van Berchem, in the early 20th-century ruins from a medieval Arab fortress were located just outside Khirbet Tin Nur. Today the fortress is no longer intact.

== Bibliography ==
- Boulanger, Robert (1966). The Middle East, Lebanon, Syria, Jordan, Iraq, Iran. Hachette.
- Hunyadi, Zs (2001). The Crusades and Military Orders: Expanding the Frontiers of Medieval Latin Christianity; in Memoriam Sir Steven Runciman (1903-2000). Central European University Press. ISBN 9639241423.
