= Assad family's cult of personality =

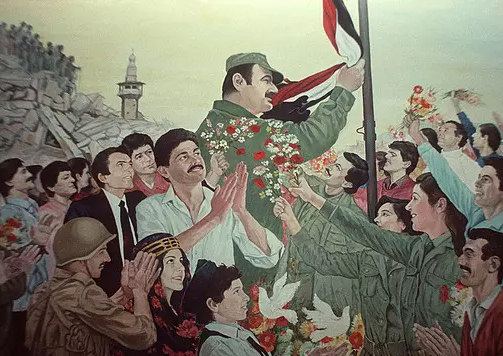
Portrait of Assad raising the Syrian flag over Quneitra in 1974. Around him is a joyful crowd of Syrian citizens with flowers and smiles.

During much of Ba'athist Syria, the ruling Assad family created a cult of personality around the family, first around Hafez al-Assad, who led Syria in various capacities from 1970 to 2000, then following Hafez's death, around his son and successor Bashar al-Assad. This cult developed to incredible proportions, involving numerous portraits, frescoes, images on money and statues, with the Assad family visible everywhere. The government had complete control over all mass media and all spheres of life in Syria, effectively spreading its cult of personality. Although Assad was not a communist or a Marxist-Leninist, he built a personality cult in a similar vein to that of Joseph Stalin.

== Coming to power and first actions ==
Syrian army general Hafez al-Assad came to power in 1970 after a successful and bloodless coup against the regime of Salah Jadid, Syria's first neo-Ba'athist leader. According to Patrick Seale, Assad's rule "began with an immediate and considerable advantage: the government he displaced was so detested that any alternative came as a relief". He first tried to establish national unity, which he felt had been lost under the leadership of Michel Aflaq and Salah Jadid. Assad differed from his predecessor at the outset, visiting local villages and hearing citizen complaints. The Syrian people felt that Assad's rise to power would lead to change; one of his first acts as ruler was to visit Sultan al-Atrash, father of the Aflaqite Ba'athist Mansur al-Atrash, to honor his efforts during the Great Arab Revolution. He made overtures to the Writers' Union, rehabilitating those who had been forced underground, jailed or sent into exile for representing what radical neo-Ba'athists called the reactionary classes. Although Assad did not democratize the country, he eased the government's repressive policies.

But in the 1980s, after a recent Muslim Brotherhood uprising (which had been brutally suppressed), his regime hardened: Assad resumed its version of militaristic Leninism, repealing liberalization introduced when Assad came to power. These years were characterized by an even greater expansion of Assad's personality cult.

== Creation and ideas of the cult of personality ==
=== Ideas of the personality cult ===
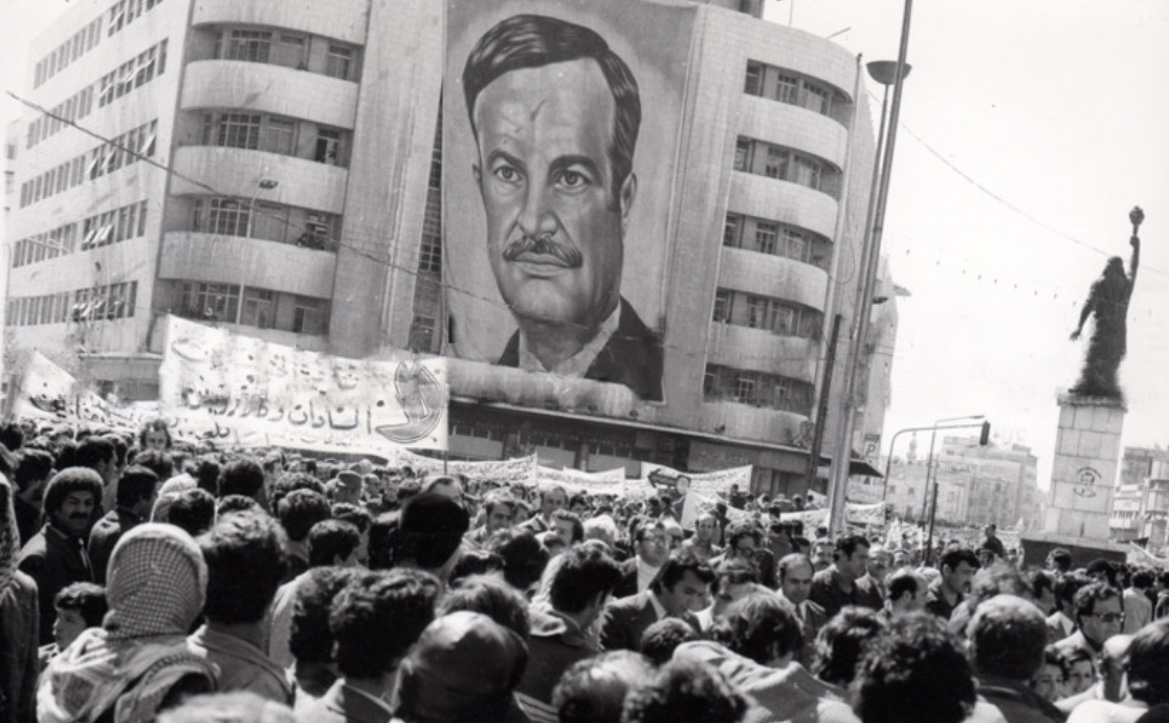
Anti Camp-David agreement demonstration in Yousef al-Azm square in Damascus, with a portrait of Hafez al-Assad hanging from a building

Assad began an intense consolidation of power (known as Assadization), and part of this included the formation of a personality cult, so he was able to quickly develop a state-sponsored cult of personality in order to maintain power. Because he wanted to become an Arab leader, he often represented himself as a successor to Egypt's Gamal Abdel Nasser, having risen to power in November 1970, a few weeks after Nasser's death. He modelled his presidential system on Nasser's, hailed Nasser for his pan-Arabic leadership, and in public he displayed photographs of Nasser alongside posters of himself. Assad also demonstrated his admiration for Salah ad-Din, a Muslim Kurdish leader who in the 12th century unified the Muslim East and defeating the Crusaders in 1187 and subsequently conquered Jerusalem. Assad displayed a large painting of Salah ad-Din's tomb in Damascus in his office and issued a currency bill featuring Salah ad-Din. In his speeches and conversations, Assad frequently hailed Salah ad-Din's successes and his victory over the Crusaders while equating Israel with the Kingdom of Jerusalem, the Crusaders' state.

Assad developed a Stalinist-style personality cult around him; which depicted him as the father figure of Syrian nation. Ba'ath party loyalists designated him as "Al-Abad"; an Arabic terminology with deep religious dimensions. Linguistically, ''Al-Abad'' means "forever, infinite and immortality" and religious clerics use this term in relation to Divine Attributes. By designating Assad as "Al-Abad", Syrian Ba'ath Movement ideologically elevated Hafez al-Assad as its "Immortal", "god-like figure" who is supposed to represent the state as well as the Syrian nation itself. Another meaning of Al-Abad is "permanent", which is used in state propaganda to denote the perpetual status quo of an "eternal political order" created by Hafez al-Assad, who continues to live in Assadist ideology. Arab Socialist Ba'ath party initially manufactured Hafez al-Assad's cult of Arab socialist heroism in consultancy with Soviet state propagandists, mimicking the pervasive personality cults prevalent across Soviet Bloc dictatorships like Communist Romania and North Korea.

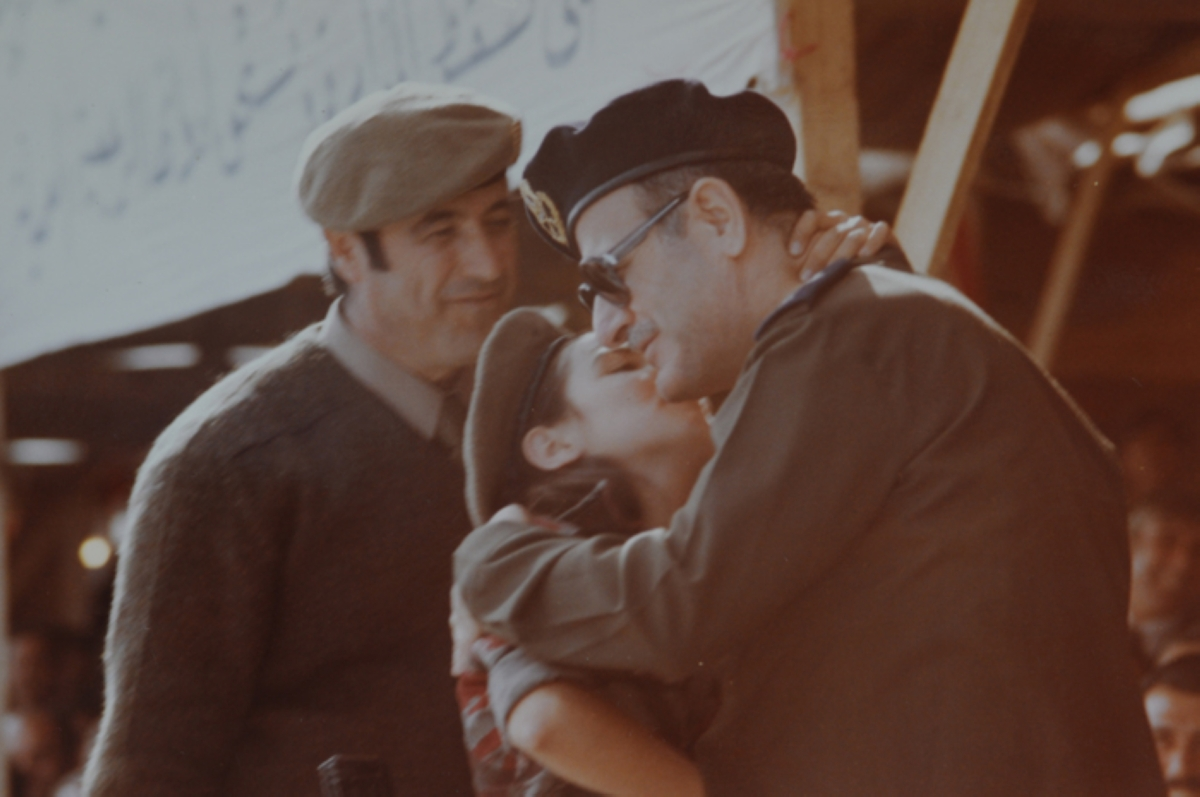
Hafez al-Assad during a military ceremony in Syria

Beginning as a tool to bind every Syrian citizen with the obligation of undying loyalty (bay'ah) to Assad in 1970s, the propaganda was further intensified and personalist depictions reached new heights during the 1980s. Often, to prove their loyalty, ballots in presidential elections were demonstratively marked with blood. Also, on referendum days, solemn marches and celebrations with partisan songs and dances took place all over Syria all day long. The personality cult portrayed Assad as a farmer, a worker surrounded and loved by children, a humble party worker, and especially often a strong military leader. The state began re-writing Syrian history itself, with the Ba'ath party deifying Hafez al-Assad as their "leader for eternity" ["qa'iduna ila l-abad"] and portraying him as "the second Saladin" who guarantees Arab peoples victory over Zionist Crusaders. Through kindergarten, school books, educational institutions and Ba'athist media; Assadist propaganda constructed the image of a homogenous Arab nation protected by a fatherly leader revelling under the "cult of Saladin". Assad regime venerates Hafez al-Assad's personalist iconography perpetually in the public and private spheres of everyday Syrian life. After Hafez's death, the personality cult was extended to his son, Bashar al-Assad. Monuments, pictures, statues, symbols and billboards of both the leaders extensively pervade Syrian society, designed to consolidate the notion of "Assad's Syria". Observers view the state propaganda efforts as a strategy for securing the compliance of the masses and identifying Syrian nationhood with the Assad dynasty. In addition to Assad's ambition to turn Syria into a regional power and to himself become a pan-Arab leader, Assad calculated that working for Arab unity and stepping up the struggle against Israel were likely to strengthen his legitimacy and leadership among the various sections of the Syrian population. Ba'athist propaganda portrayed Hafez al-Assad as a strong leader whose wisdom was "beyond the comprehension of the average citizen." Syrian state propaganda also cast Assadism (state ideology since 1970, based on the ideas and thinking of Hafez Assad) as a neo-Ba'athist current that evolved Ba'athist ideology with the needs of the modern era. The cult of personality portrayed Assad as a defender of the Palestinians against Israel, as a strong military leader, as a wise, modest and just leader of the country.

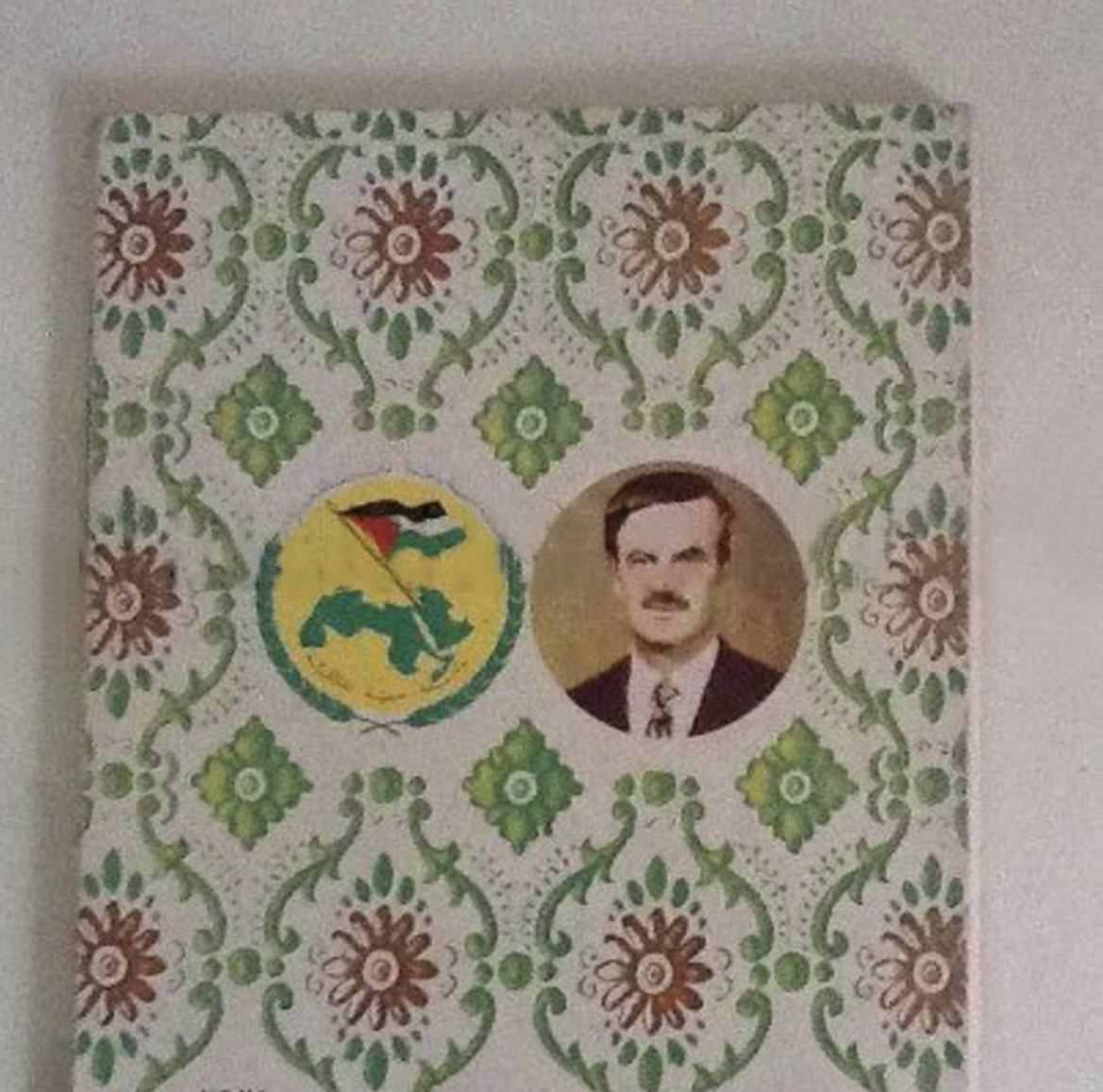
A standard Syrian school notebook in the 1980s. It has images of the president Assad and the emblem of the ruling Ba'ath party.

Portraits of Assad, often depicting him engaging in heroic activities, were placed in public spaces. He named numerous places and institutions after himself and members of his family. In schools, children were taught to sing songs of adulation about Hafez al-Assad. Teachers began each lesson with the song "Our eternal leader, Hafez al-Assad". Assad was sometimes portrayed with apparently divine properties. Sculptures and portraits depicted him alongside the prophet Mohammad, and after his mother's death, the government produced portraits of her surrounded by a halo. Syrian officials were made to refer to him as 'the sanctified one' (al-Muqaddas). This strategy was also pursued by Assad's son and next dictator, Bashar al-Assad. Hafez named myriad numbers of places and institutions in Syria after himself and other members of his family, such as Lake Assad, an artificial reservoir filled during his time in office. School students were taught Ba'athism and Assadist ideas through a course known as "Political Arab Sociology". Propaganda and the cult of personality of Assad were also promoted through Ba'athist youth organizations such as the Revolutionary Youth Union or RYU (membership in which was mandatory). Since Hafez al-Assad's seizure of power in 1970; state propaganda has promoted a new national discourse based on unifying Syrians under "a single imagined Ba'athist identity" and Assadism. Fervently loyalist paramilitaries known as the Shabiha (tr. ghosts) deify the Assad dynasty through slogans such as There is no God except Bashar! (Arabic: لا إله الا بشار) and pursue psychological warfare against non-conformist populations. Many books have been written in praise of Hafez al-Assad. In a state newspapers he was called "Lebanon's Saviour", "Gallant Knight", "Nation's teacher", "The Father", "Comrade" and "Leader", but the title that stuck with him most was "Eternal Leader."

Middle East Insight magazine says: "In no other country in recent memory ... not Mao's China, nor Tito's Yugoslavia, has the intensity of the personality cult reached such extremes. Asad's image, speaking, smiling, listening, benevolent or stern, solemn or reflective, is everywhere. Sometimes there are half a dozen pictures of him in a row. His face envelops telephone poles and trucks, churches and mosques. His is the visage a Syrian sees when he opens his newspaper."

== Outside of Syria ==
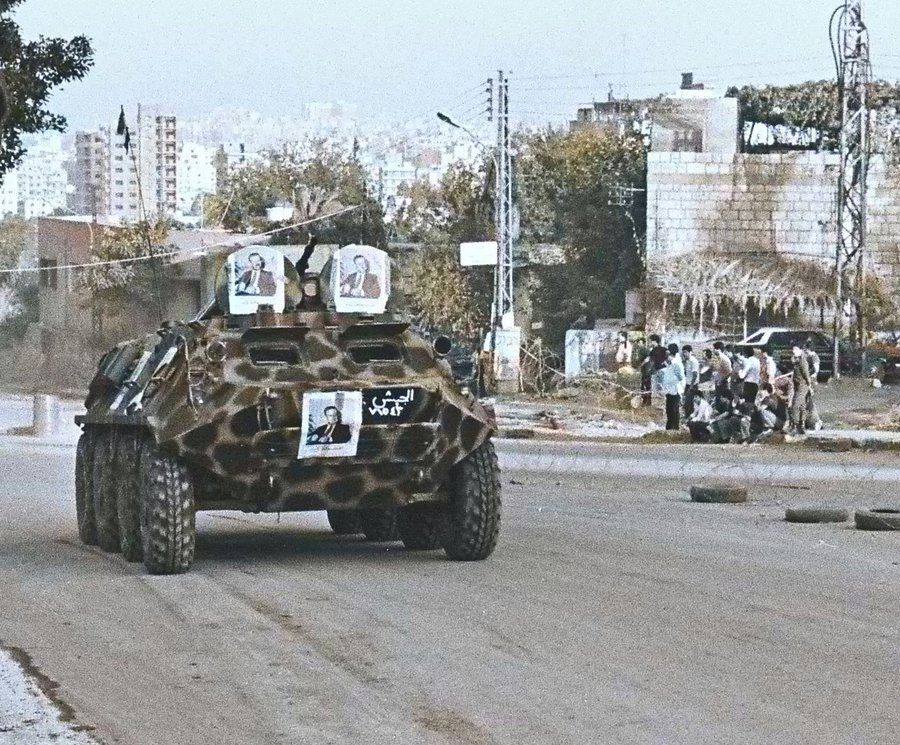
Syrian BTR-60 with portraits of Hafez al-Assad in Lebanon, 1982

Assad also had his supporters and something of a personality cult outside Syria, most notably in neighboring Lebanon. From 1976 to 2005, the Syrian Arab Army was able to occupy much of Lebanon, where soldiers hung portraits of Assad and helped Lebanese citizens do the same. And it wasn't just portraits: in territory controlled by Syria and its ally Hezbollah, there were also huge billboards with portraits of Assad. Hezbollah, for its part, depicted Assad on its propaganda posters next to the organization's longtime leader, Hassan Nasrallah, showing the two men's long-standing partnership.

== The influence of historical events ==
=== Yom Kippur war ===
The Yom Kippur War has been a very important component in Government propaganda and the personality cult of Hafez Assad.

On October 6, 1973, Syria, along with Egypt (led by Anwar Sadat), went to war against Israel. Initially, the two Arab armies made significant gains on both fronts, but later, in the face of vastly superior Israeli forces, lack of coordination, and severe misunderstandings with Egypt, Syria lost its military gains, while Israel advanced deeper into Syria, to the Bashan salient.

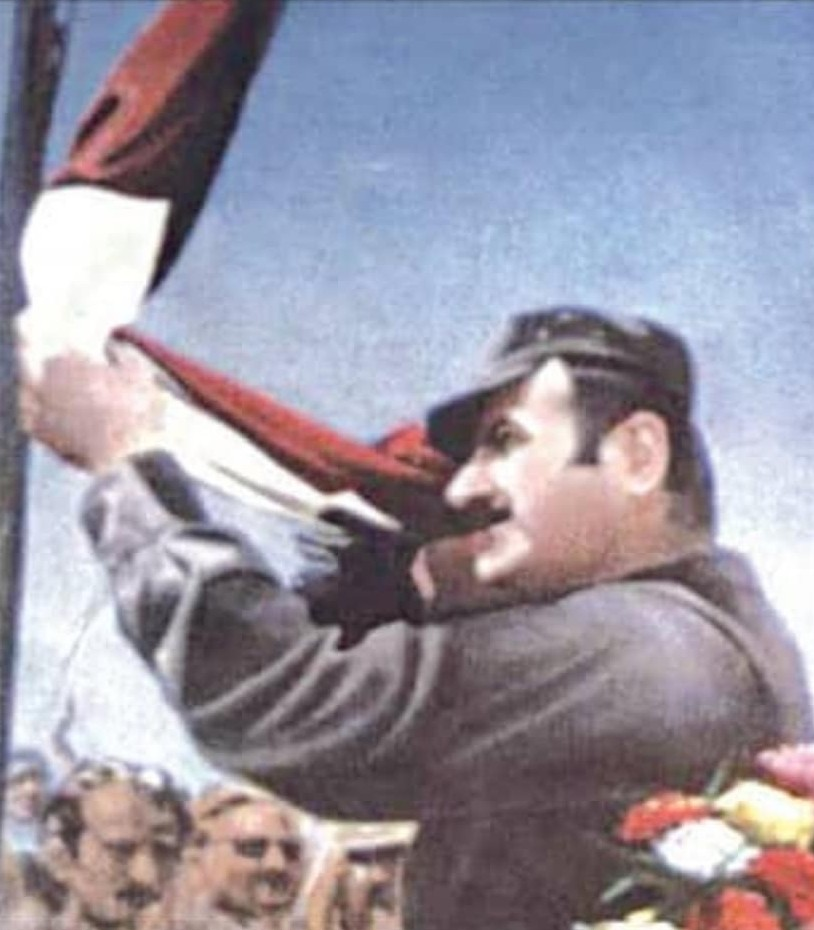
Another portrait of iconic moment of Assad raising Syrian flag over Quneitra

The main reason for the reversal of fortune was Egypt's operational pause from 7 to 14 October. After capturing parts of the Sinai, the Egyptian campaign halted and the Syrians were left fighting the Israelis alone. The Egyptian leaders, believing their war aims accomplished, dug in. While their early successes in the war had surprised them, War Minister General Ahmad Ismail Ali advised caution. In Syria, Assad and his generals waited for the Egyptians to move. When the Israeli government learned of Egypt's modest war strategy, it ordered an "immediate continuous action" against the Syrian military. According to Patrick Seale, "For three days, 7, 8, and 9 October, Syrian troops on the Golan faced the full fury of the Israeli air force as, from first light to nightfall, wave after wave of aircraft swooped down to bomb, strafe and napalm their tank concentration and their fuel and ammunition carriers right back to the Purple Line."

However, unlike in the Six-Day War, the Syrian Arab Army was not routed. While Egypt withdrew from the war by signing unilateral agreements with Israel, Assad continued a war of attrition against Israel, inflicting losses on it and blocking the possibility of increasing Israeli gains. Assad's skill as a cool, proud, tough, and shrewd negotiator in the post war period enabled him to gain the town of Kuneitra and the respect and admiration of many Arabs. Assad signed a disengagement agreement with Israel only in May 1974, emerging from the war as a resilient and strong player. In June, 26, Assad raised the Syrian flag in a grand and public manner over Kuneitra, which he had received after the war, and which became an important symbol of the personality cult. Propaganda and cult of personality portrayed this war as a clear victory for Assad. Many of his followers now regarded Assad as the new pan-Arab leader, and a worthy successor of Nasser. After the war, Assad began to rise even higher and was called the hero of November and October.

=== Collapse of the Eastern bloc ===
When the communist governments in the Eastern Bloc collapsed, an ideological crisis within the government arose. However, Assad and his supporters hit back, stating that because of the "Corrective Movement under the leadership of the warrior Hafez al-Assad", the principles of economic and political pluralism, which had been introduced "some two decades" beforehand, safeguarded the Syrian government from the possibility of collapse.

== Cult after Hafez's death ==
The cult of personality continued to exist even after Hafez al-Assad's death in 2000, when his son, Bashar al-Assad, came to power. After Hafez's death, 40 days of mourning were declared in Syria, as well as outside Syria, in a number of Arab countries: Lebanon (7 days), Egypt, Jordan, Oman, Palestine, Libya, Iran, Morocco, United Arab Emirates, Yemen, Kuwait and Qatar (all of them 3 days of mourning). Syria also saw mass demonstrations in memory of Hafez and in support of Bashar al-Assad.

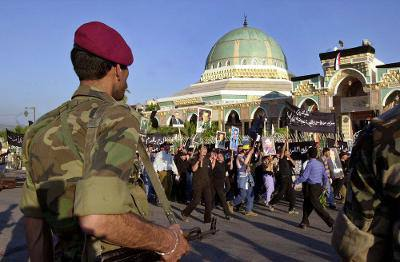
Funeral marches in Damascus, 2000

Bashar continued the cult of his father, whose portraits and statues remained hanging everywhere, but they were also joined by portraits of Bashar himself. As a result, the cult of personality as such continued to exist, albeit without its leader. Bashar continued this tradition and began to appear in numerous portraits himself, sometimes next to his father or older brother, Bassel. In general, Bashar did not introduce anything radically new, doing the same things for his cult as his father. However, Bashar did not want to be feared (as his father was feared), but respected and admired, so he created the image of a modest reformer. His associates even gave him a new title: "hope." To be admired, Bashar sought to appear modest and impressive at the same time. Rumors about his work ethic, love of technology and modest behavior, his love of modernity, posters that magically appeared against his will - all this was actively promoted by propaganda. However, the desire to build such an image did not force Bashar to abandon the military dictatorship regime inherited from his father - the state continued to carry out mass repressions against people who deviated even slightly from the predetermined line or proposed undesirable changes.

Bashar's personality cult gained momentum after the Cedar Revolution in Lebanon in 2005, which led to the forced withdrawal of all Syrian troops from the country. Propaganda songs were composed in honor of Bashar al-Assad. Bashar's portrait was sometimes even painted onto the national flag, and some tanks had a stencil of Bashar's face (sometimes Hafez's) on their night vision lights. Soldiers demonstrated their loyalty at parades, holding numerous portraits of the two Assads and shouting slogans ("With our souls, with our blood, we sacrifice ourselves for you, Bashar!", "God, Syria, and Bashar!" and others). However, similar phenomena also occurred during his father's rule.

== End of the cult ==
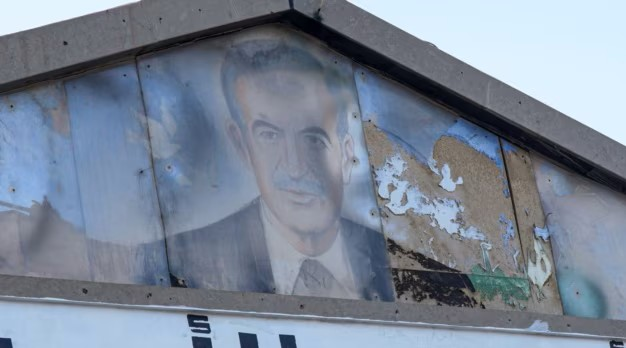
Destroyed portrait of Hafez al-Assad in Damascus, December 2024

In late November and early December 2024, Syrian opposition forces carried out the 2024 Syrian opposition offensives and later captured Damascus. This led to the fall of the Assad regime and the end of the personality cult. After the fall of the regime, the process of De-Assadization emerged as symbols relating to the Assad family were destroyed, such as statues and portraits. As the Assad family was of Alawite origin, the process of de-Assadization has also led to fears of revenge killings among the Alawite population. In particular, the 2025 massacres of Syrian Alawites amidst the continued Western Syria clashes raised concerns of sectarian violence against Alawites.

== Gallery ==
=== Hafez ===
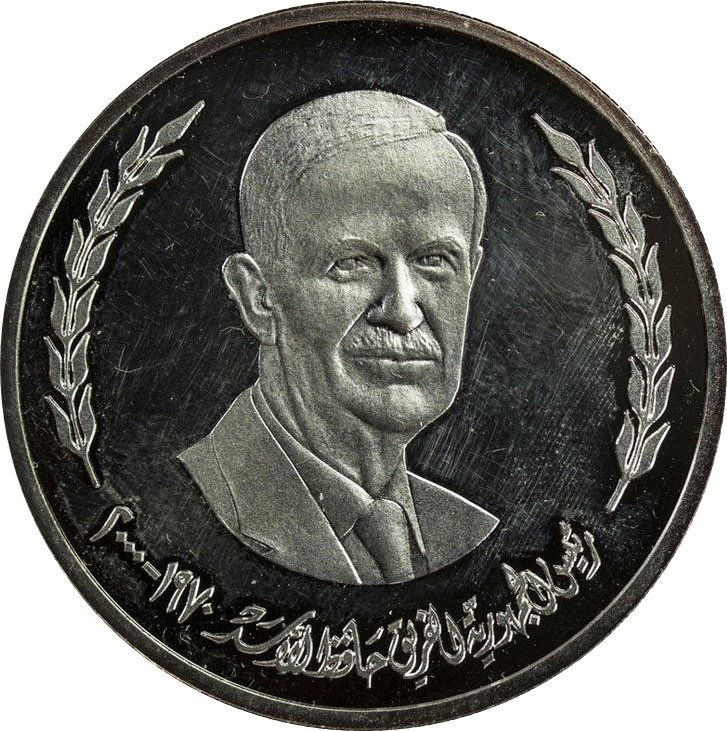
1 Syrian pound coin

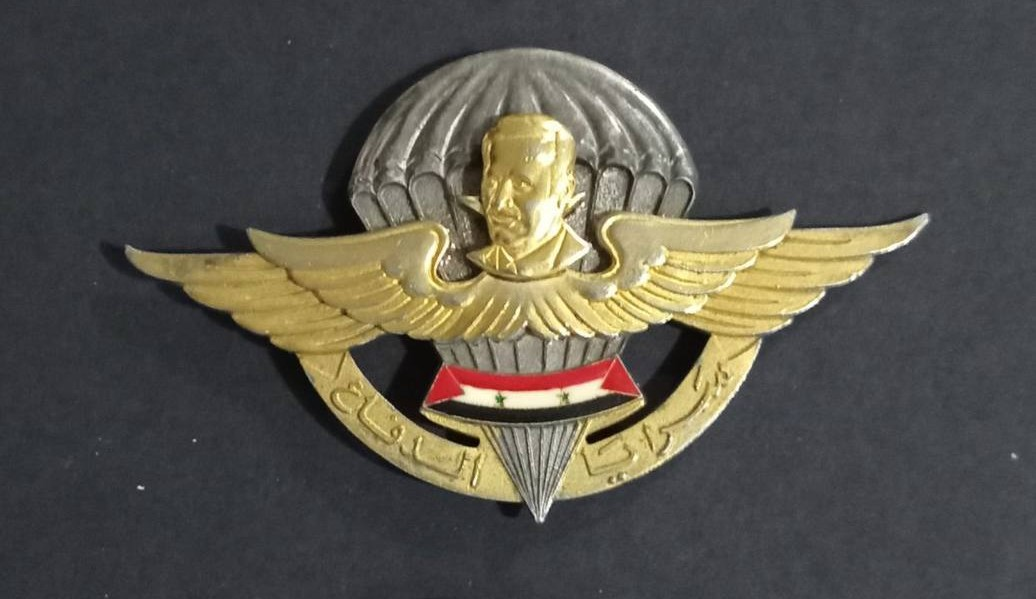
The badge of the Defense Brigades, 2nd design (after 1984)

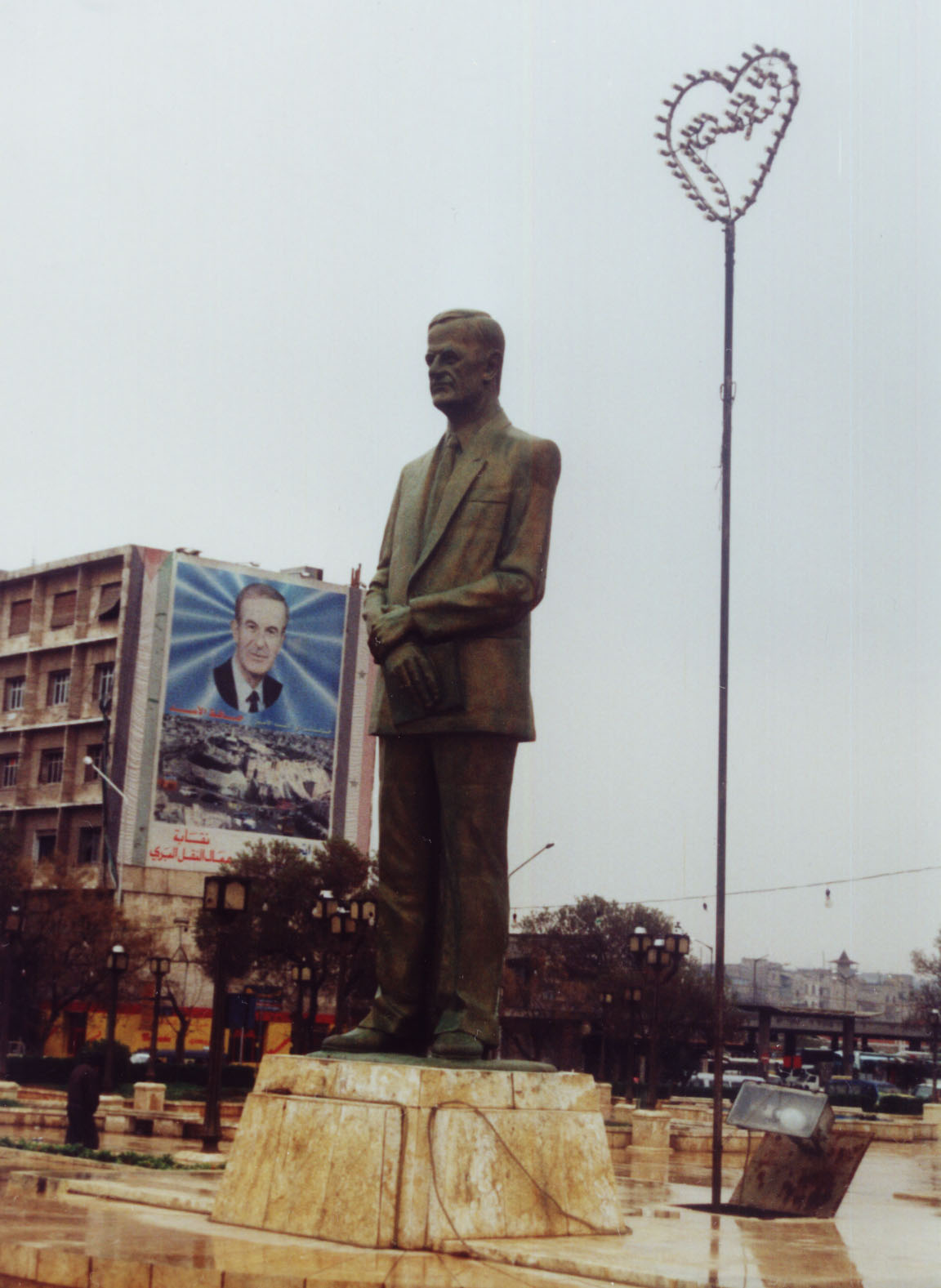
Statue in Aleppo

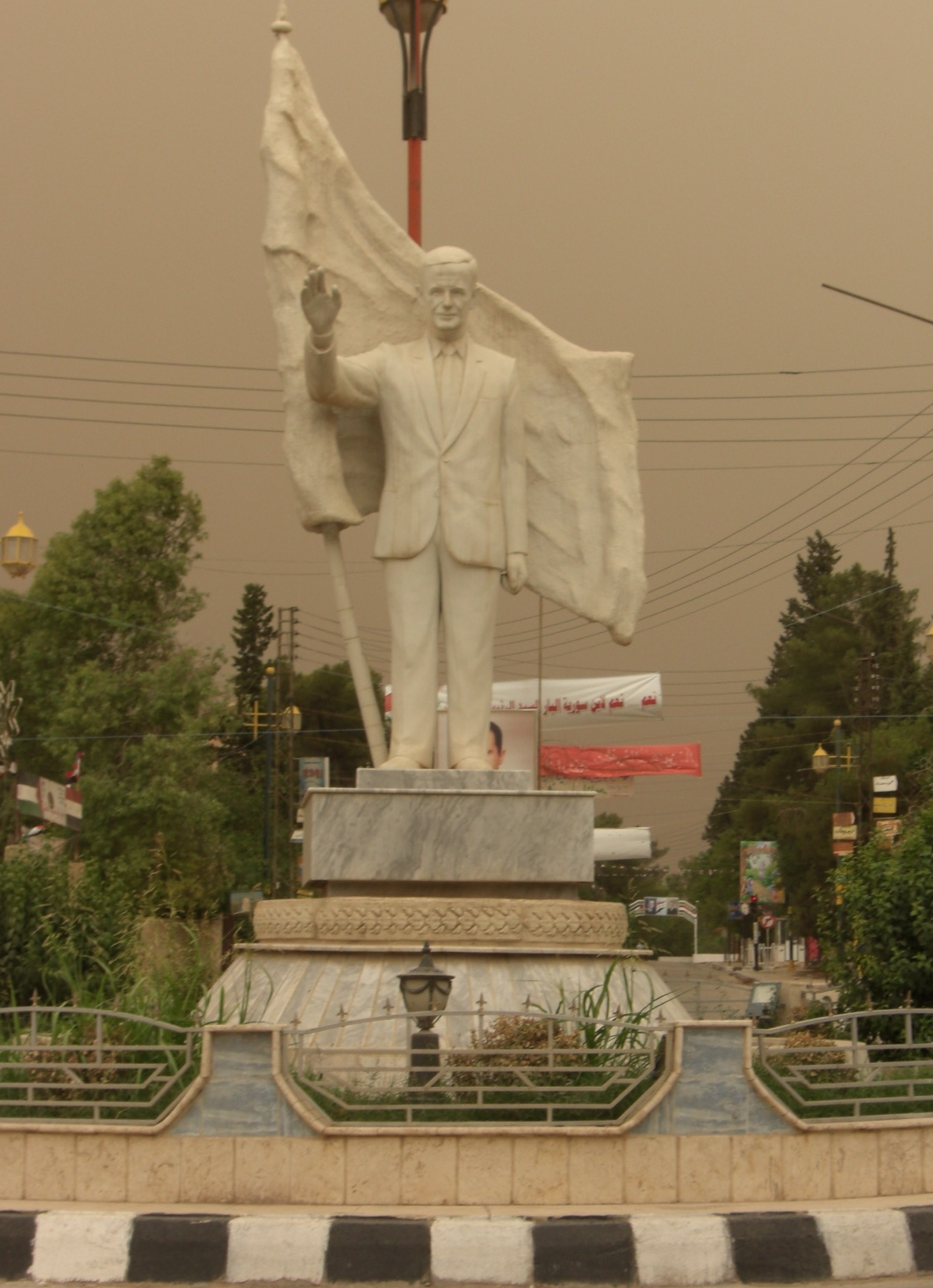
Statue in Qamishli

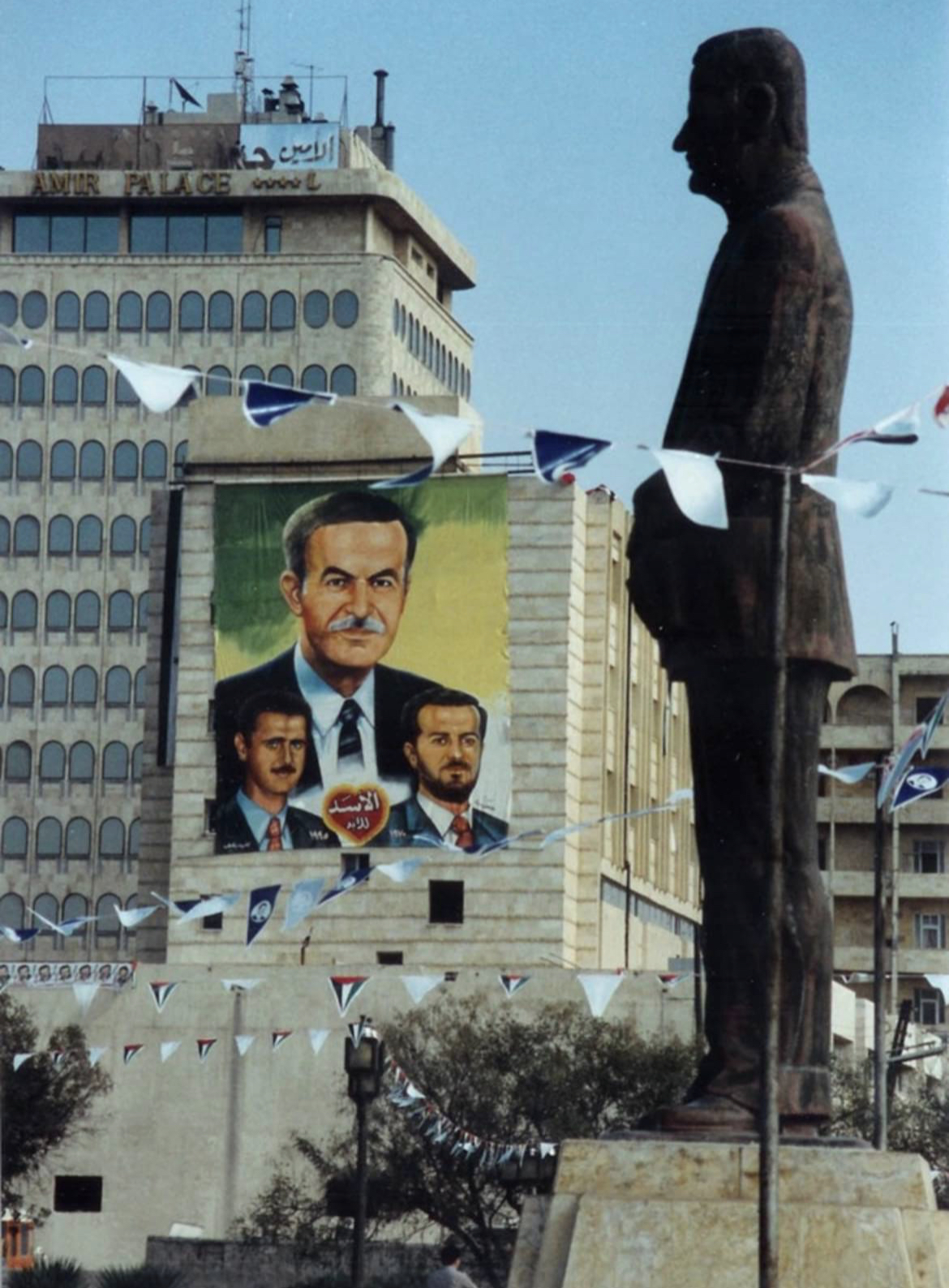
A statue and a portrait of the Assad family, 1994

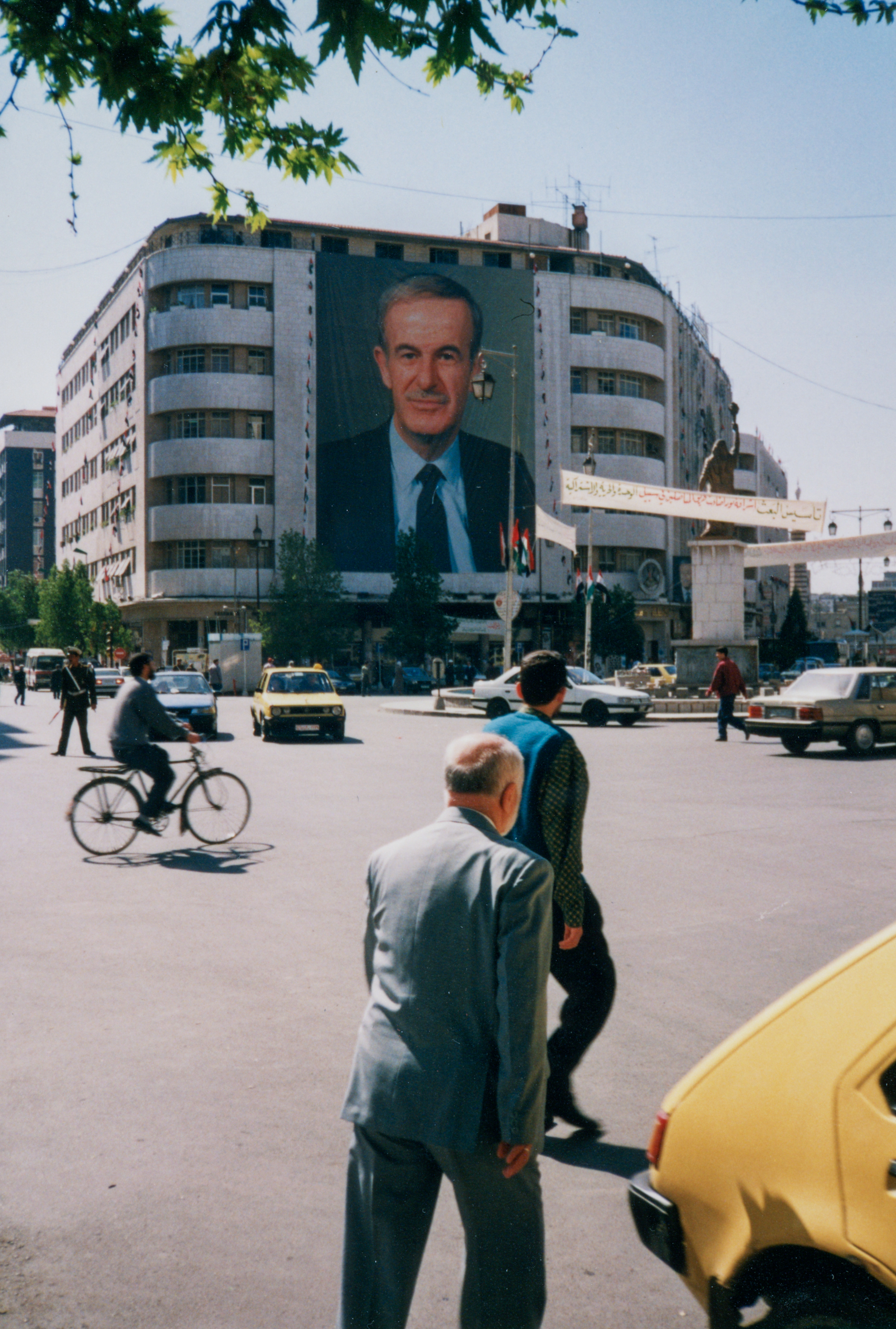
Yusuf al-Azma Square in Damascus

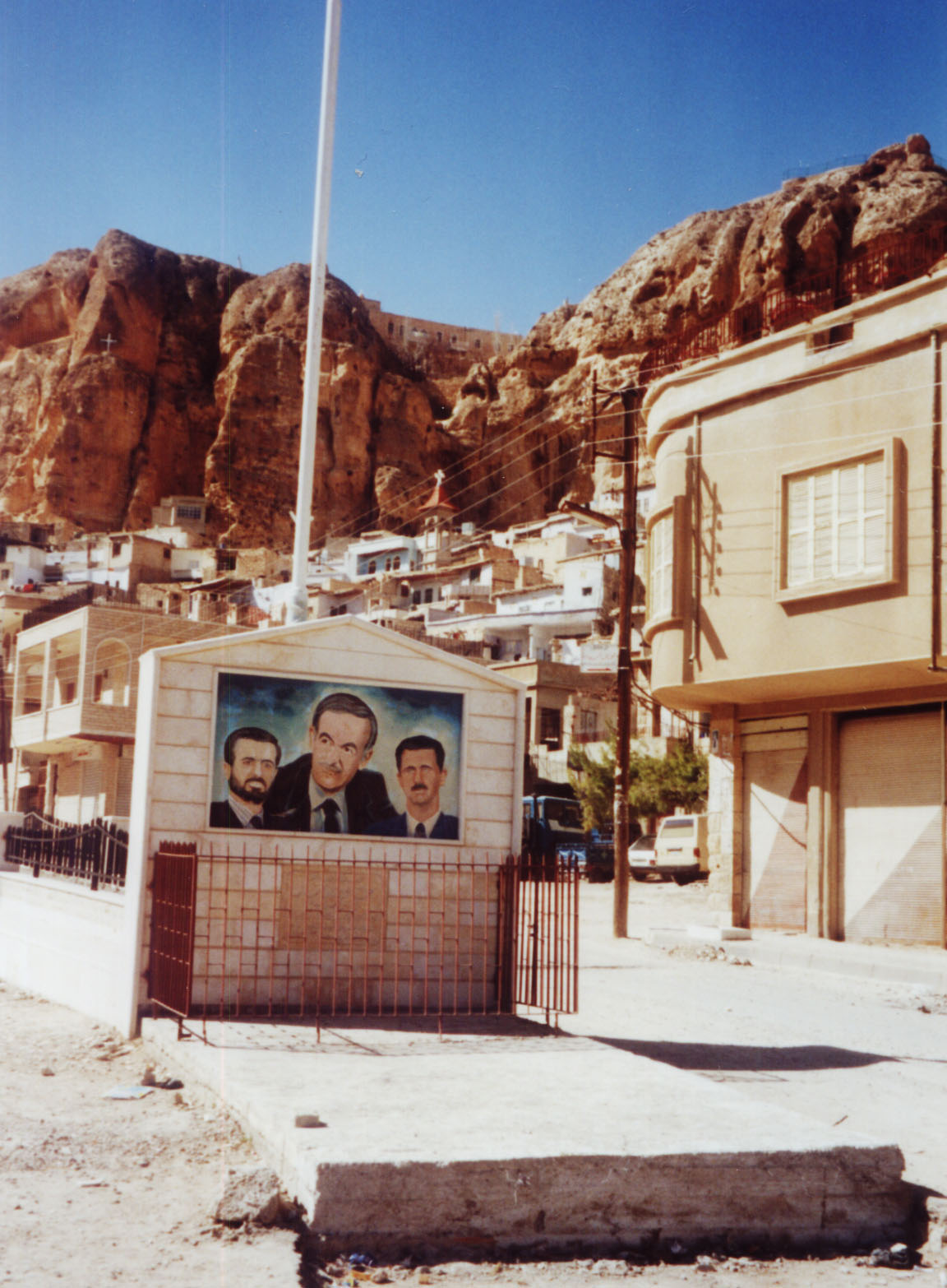
Portrait in Maaloula

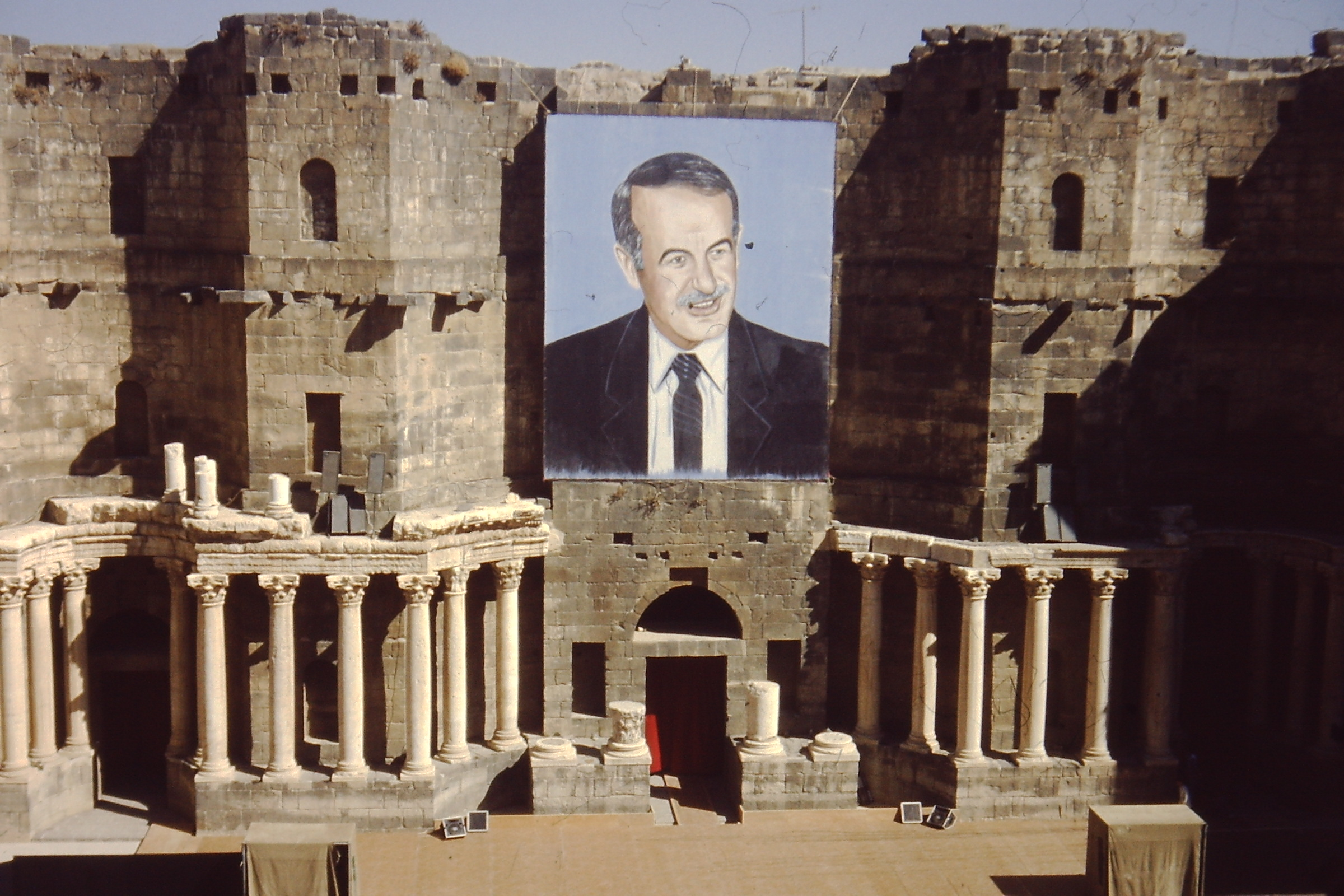
A portrait on an ancient building

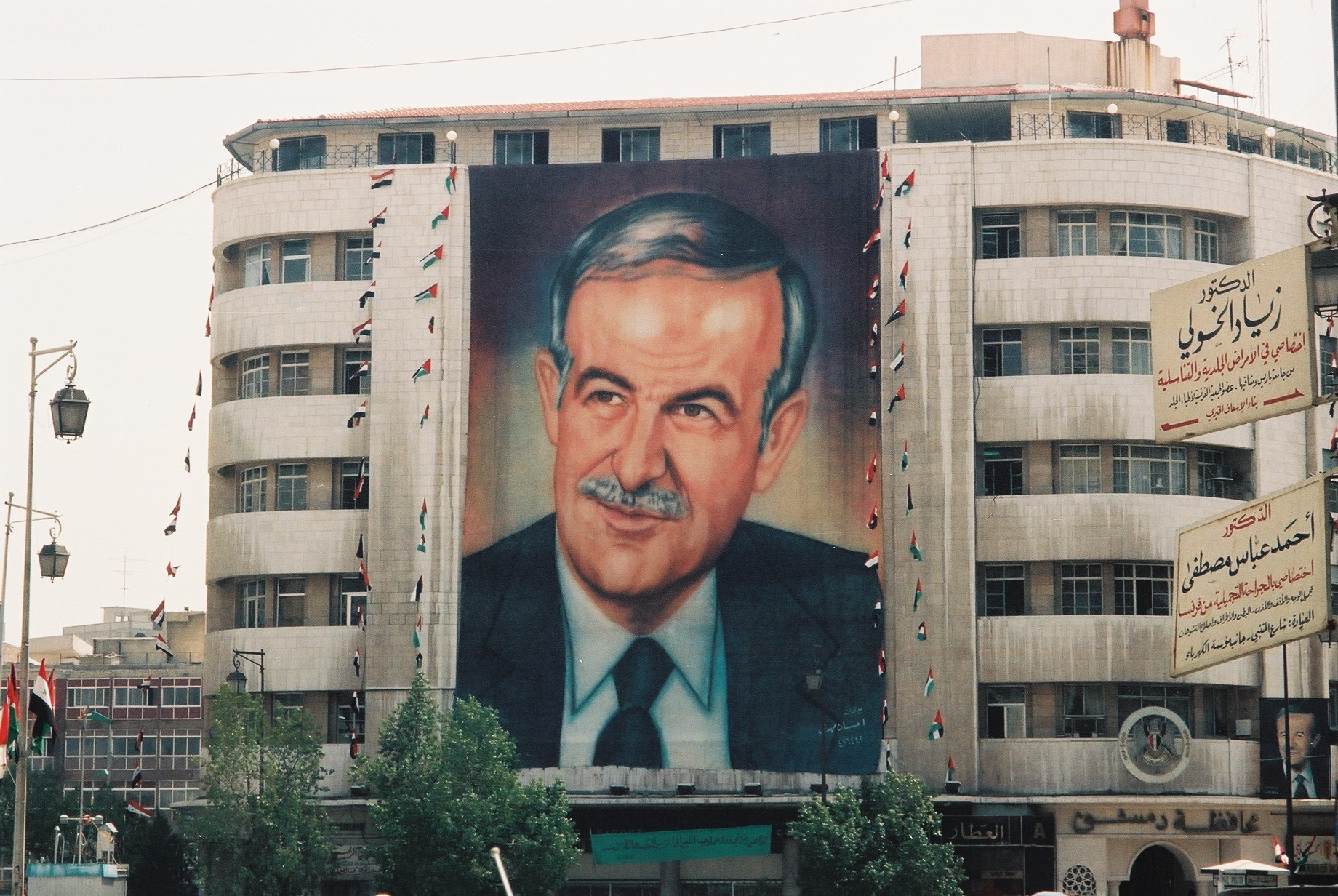
Portrait in Damascus, 1994

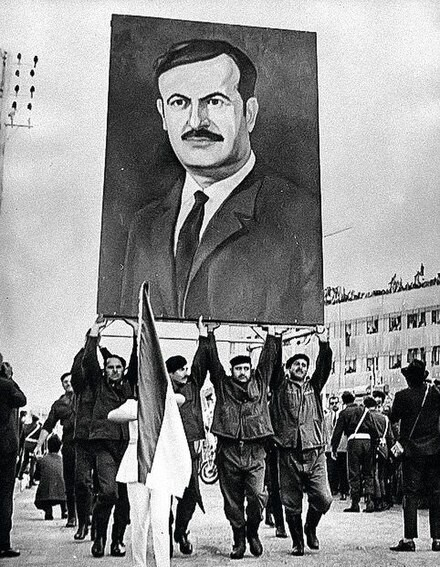
Marching with a portrait in the 1980s

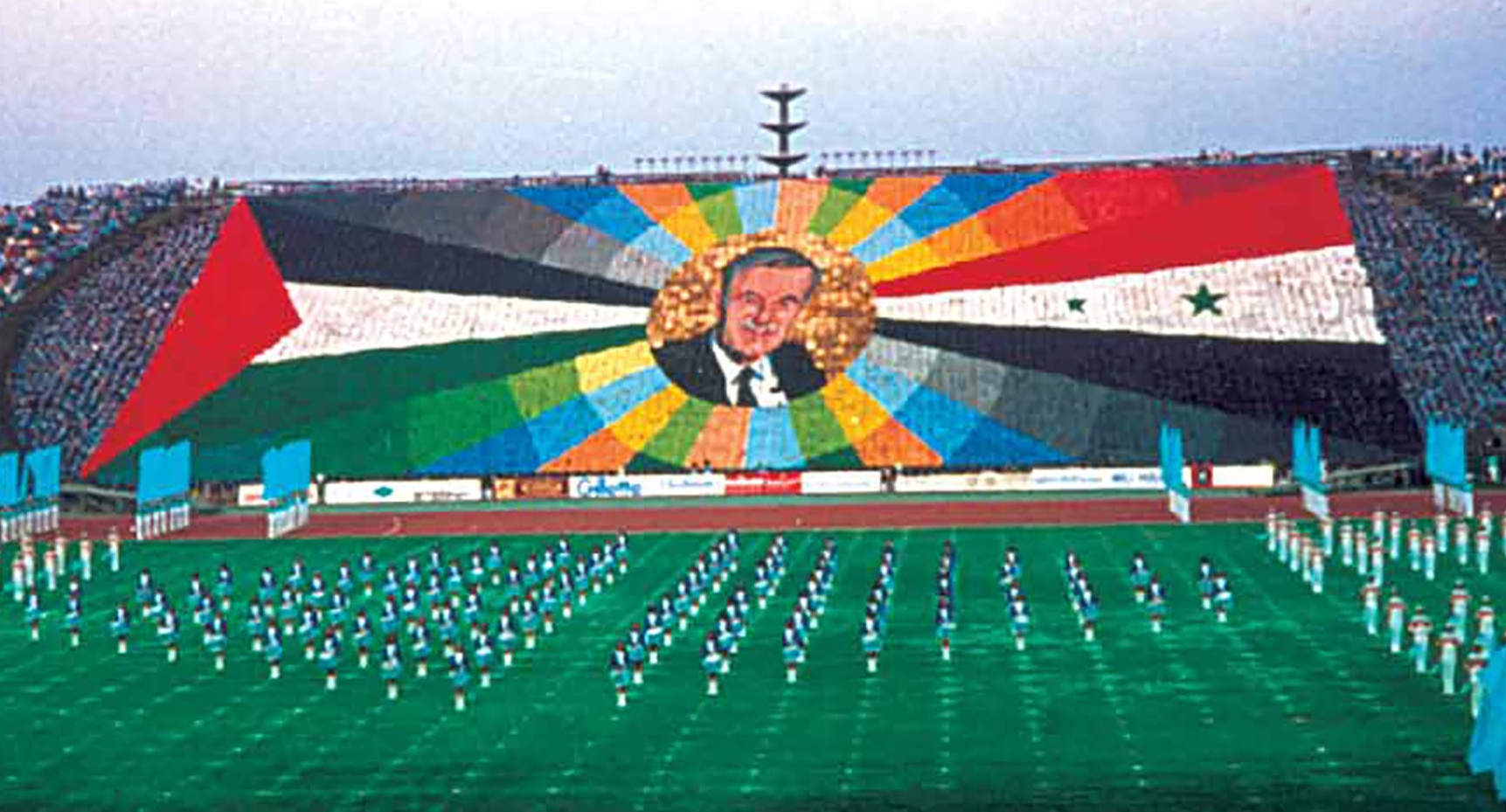
1987 Mediterranean Games opening ceremony

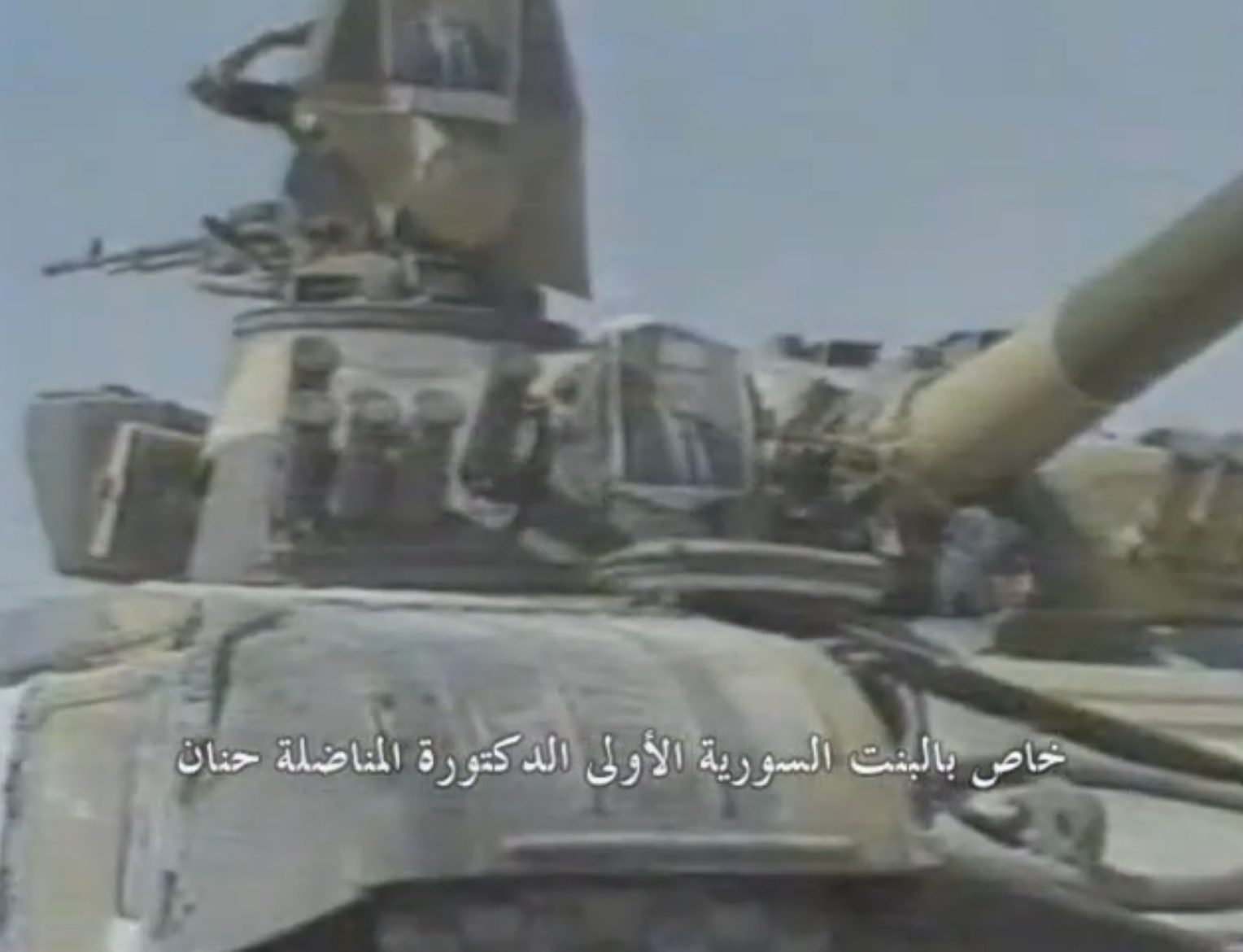
Portrait on the tank during 1990 parade

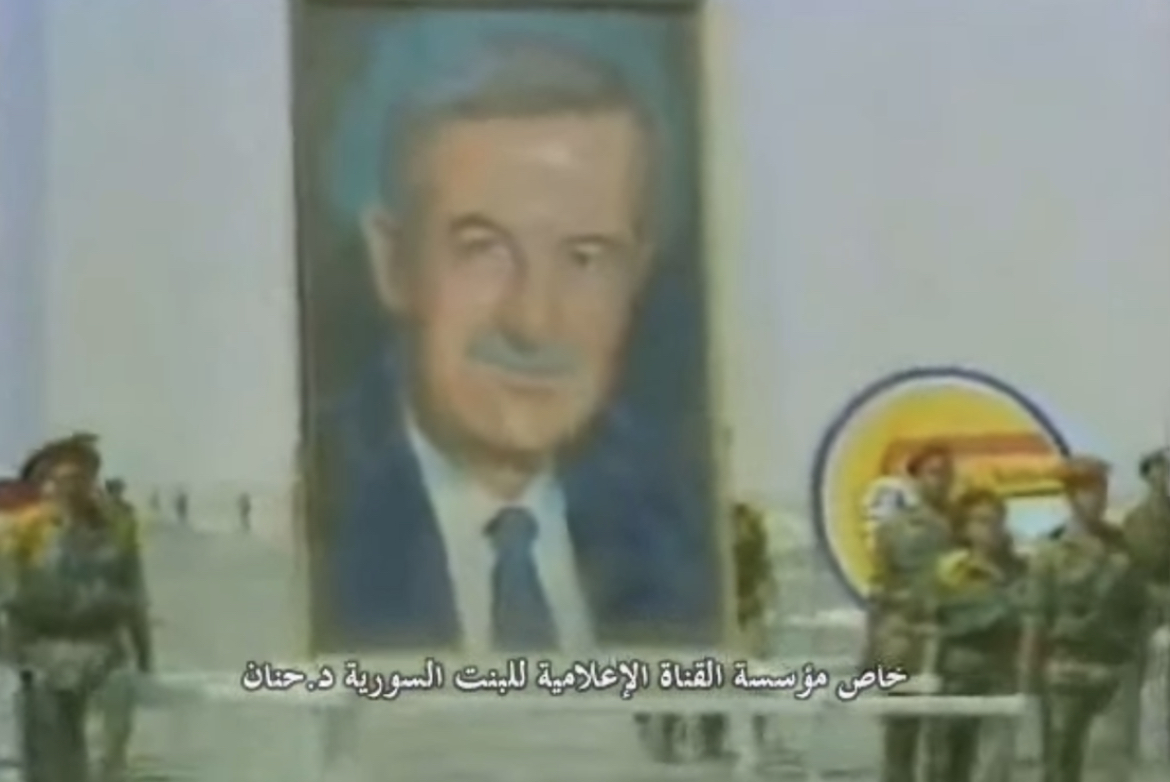
Portrait at the same military parade in 1990

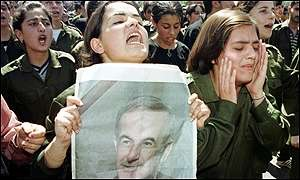
Mourning rally, 2000

=== Bashar ===
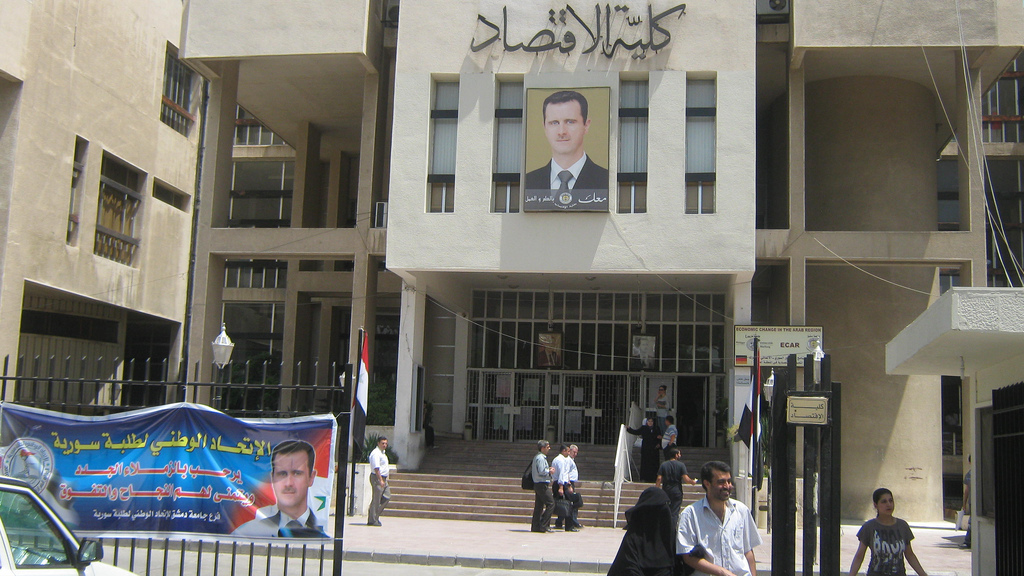
Poster in Damascus University, 2010

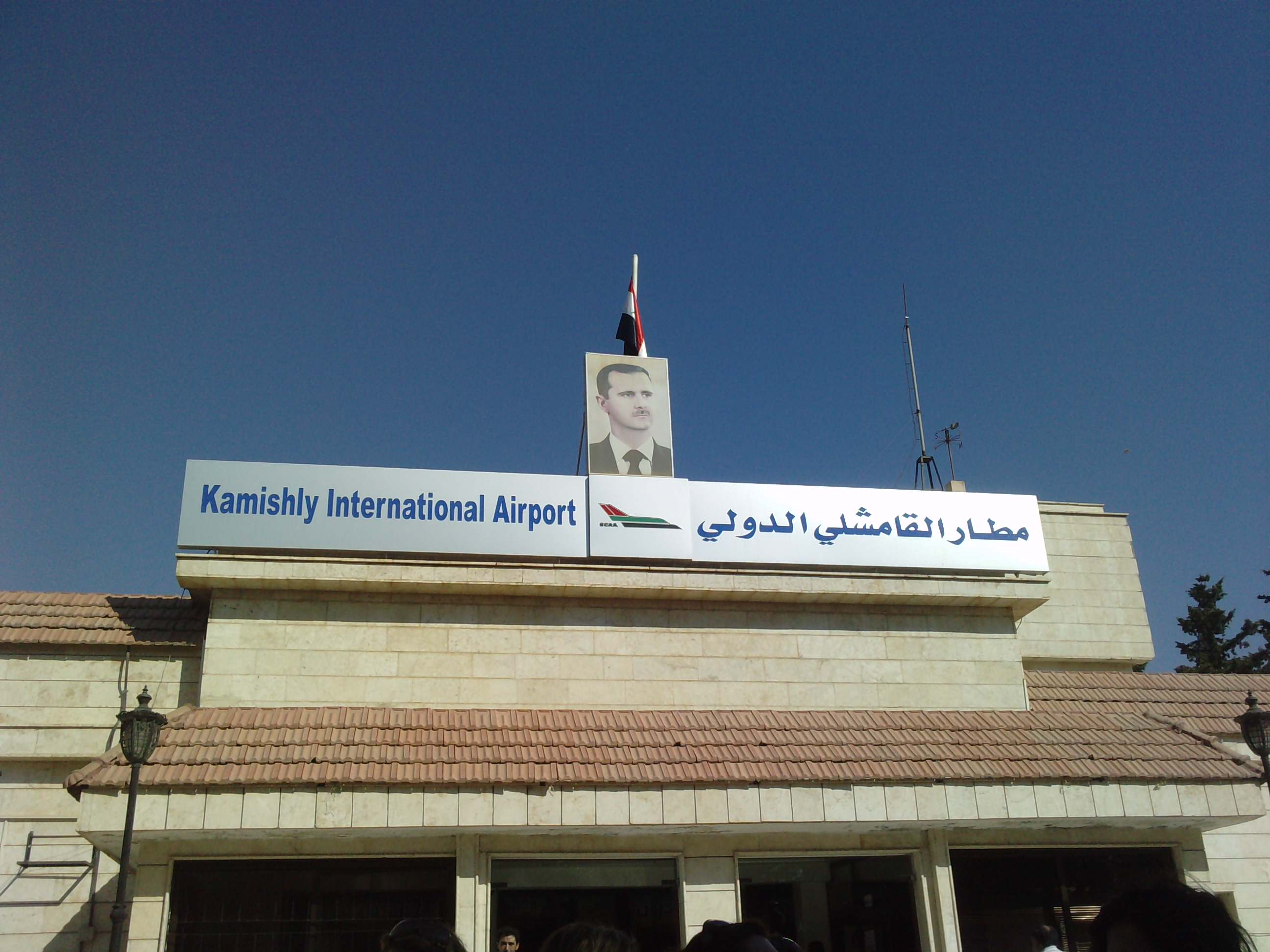
Portrait in Qamishli Airport, 2010

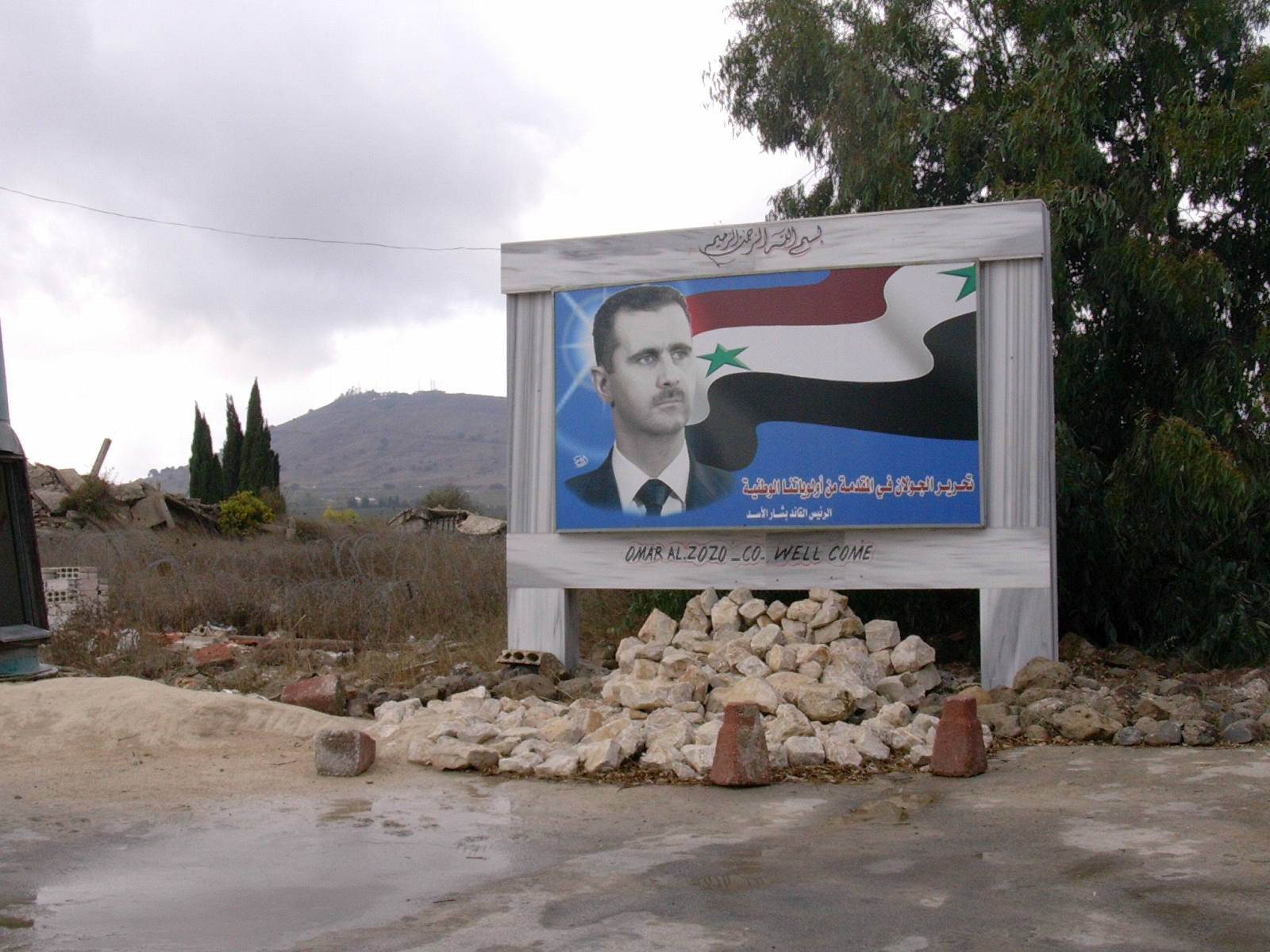
Road sign along the Syrian border with Israel, 2006

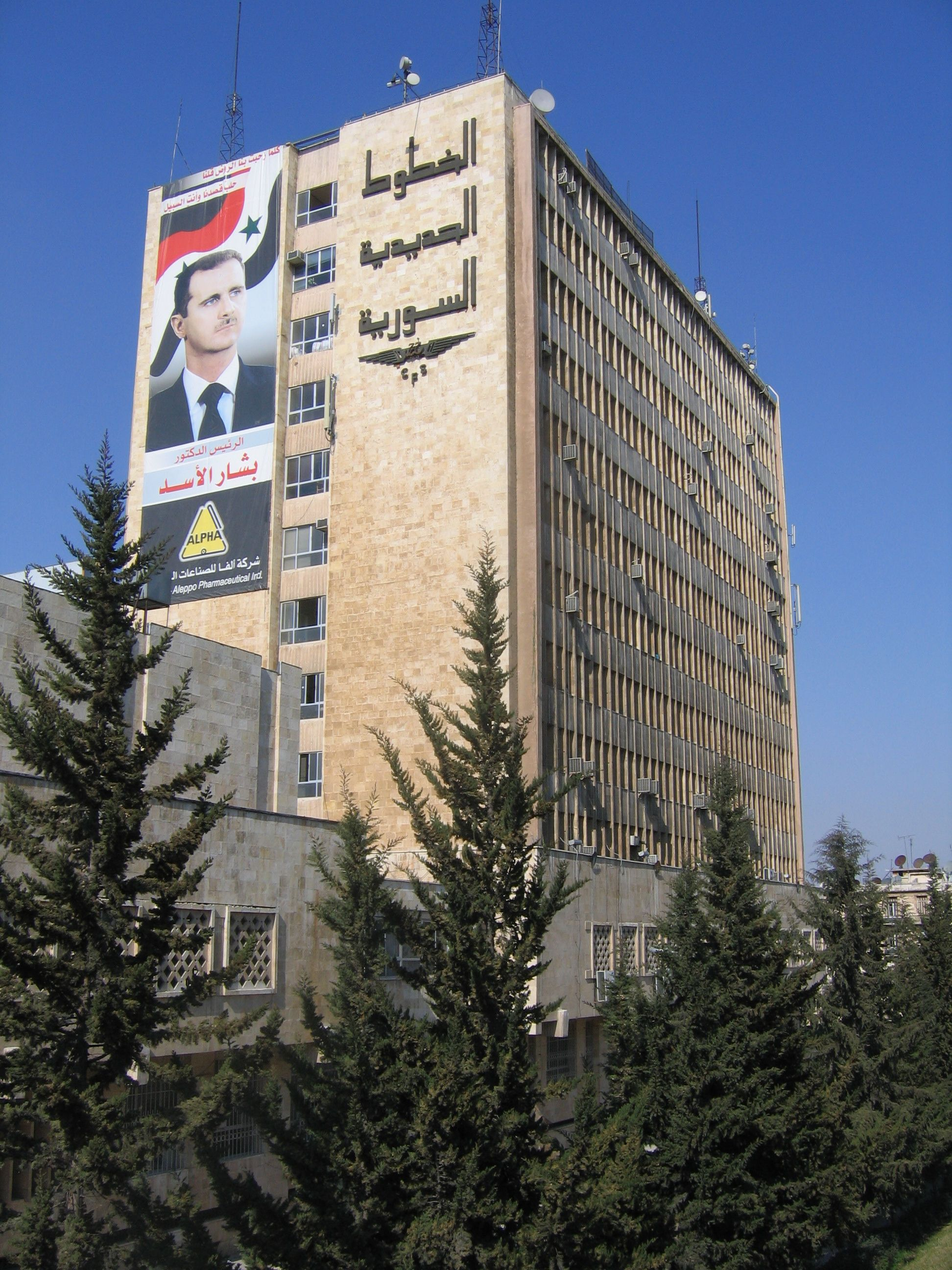
Poster in Aleppo, 2007

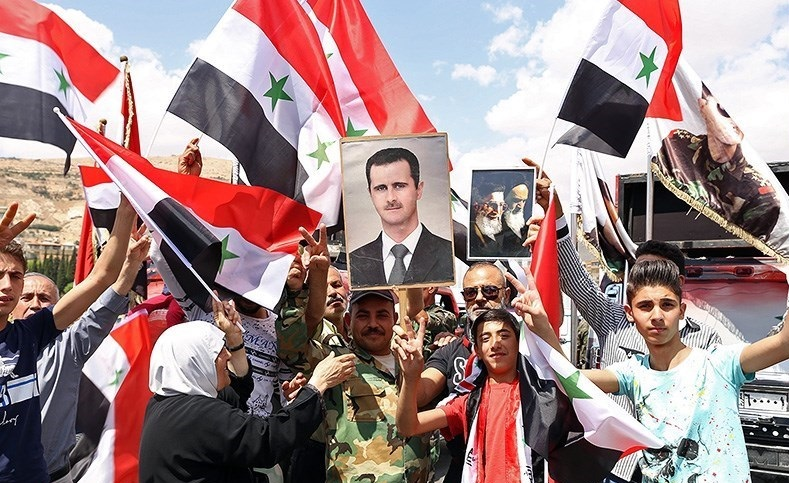
Portrait in pro-government protests, 2018

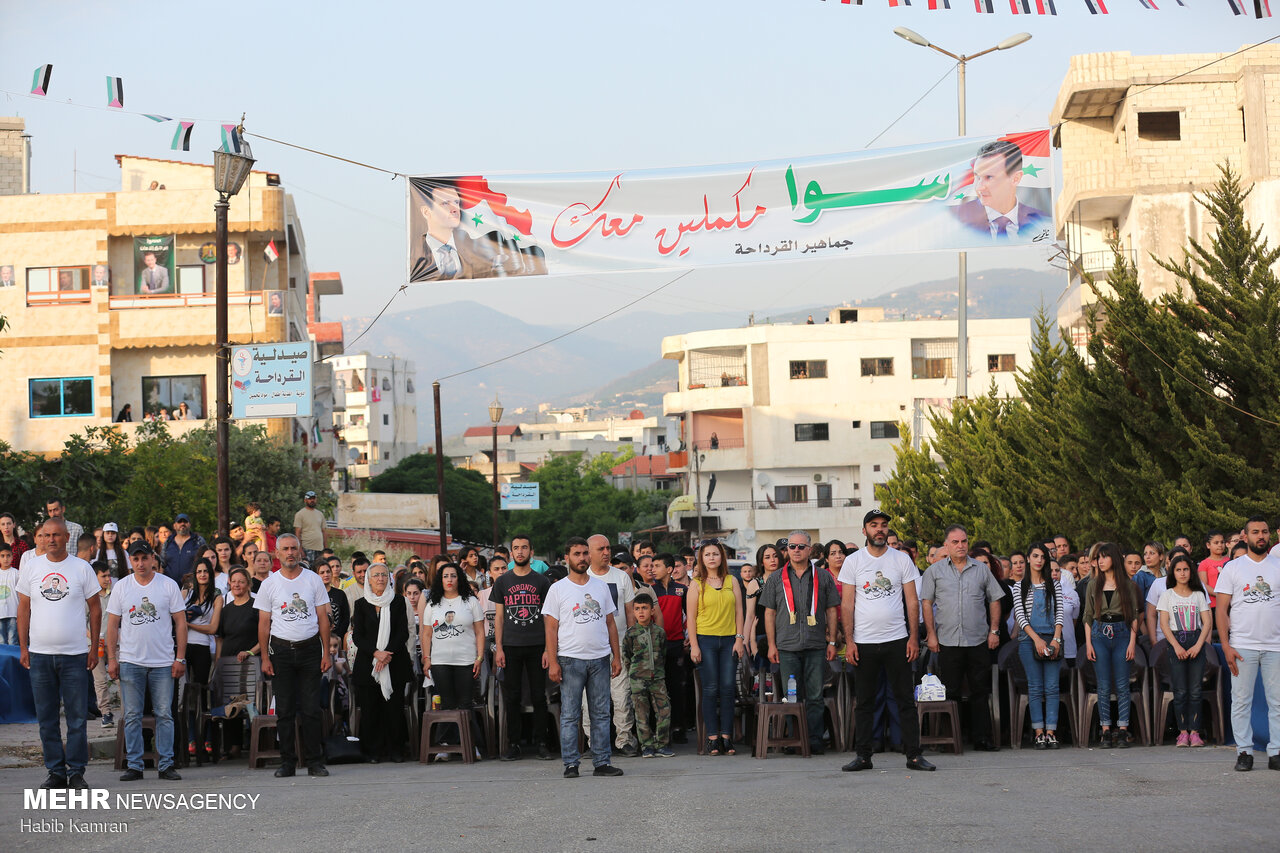
Celebration of Bashar's victory after the 2021 Syrian presidential election

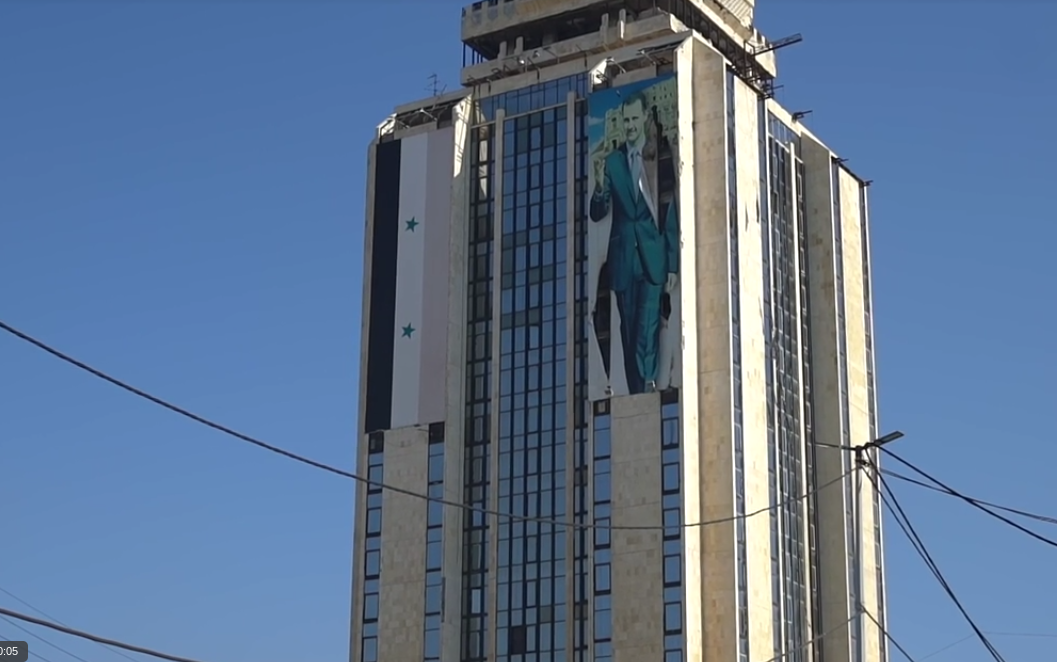
Poster of Bashar destroyed during the 2024 Syrian opposition offensives

== See also ==
- List of cults of personality
- Assadization

== Sources ==
- Hinnebusch, Raymond (2001). Syria: Revolution from Above (1st ed.). Routledge. ISBN 978-0-415-26779-3.
- Seale, Patrick (1990). Asad: The Struggle for the Middle East. University of California Press. ISBN 978-0-520-06976-3.
- Zisser, Eyal (2001). Asad's Legacy: Syria in Transition. London: C. Hurst & Co. ISBN 978-1-85065-450-6.
- Zisser, Eyal (2006). Commanding Syria: Bashar al-Asad and the First Years in Power. I. B. Tauris. ISBN 978-1-84511-153-3.
