= Raising the flag over Quneitra =

26 June 1974 event in Syria

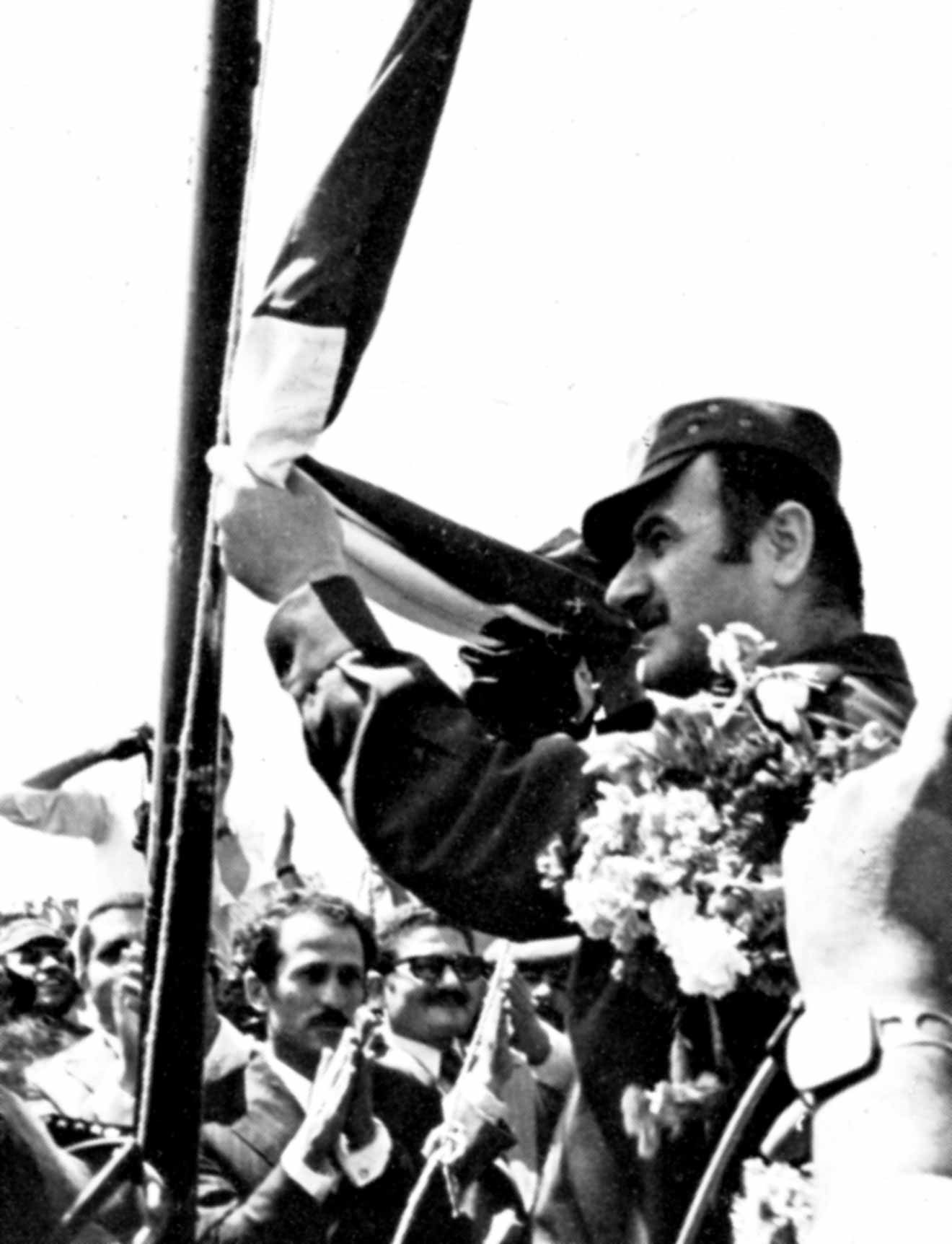
Hafez al-Assad raising flag over Quneitra on 26 June 1974.

Raising the flag over Quneitra was a historic event in Baathist Syria, which took place in the city of Quneitra on 26 June 1974, at the end of the Yom Kippur War (its final stage on the Golan Heights). Syrian President Hafez al-Assad had arrived in Quneitra, which had been handed over to Syria at the end of the war, and he raised the national flag. The event increased Assad's authority in the Arab world and became a part of his propaganda and personality cult. The day was celebrated annually by the Ba'athist government, and Ba'athist media called it, "The Day of Glory and Dignity."

== Background ==
=== Yom Kippur War ===
On October 6, 1973, Syria, along with Egypt (led by Anwar Sadat), went to war against Israel. Initially, the two Arab armies made significant gains on both fronts, but later, in the face of superior Israeli forces, a lack of coordination, and severe misunderstandings with Egypt, Syria lost its military gains, while Israel advanced deeper into Syria, to the Bashan salient. A key reason for the reversal of fortune was Egypt's operational pause from 7 to 14 October.

After capturing parts of the Sinai, the Egyptian campaign halted leaving the Syrians fighting the Israelis alone. Egyptian leaders, believing their war aims accomplished, dug in. War Minister General Ahmad Ismail Ali advised caution. In Syria, Assad and his generals waited for the Egyptians to move. When the Israeli government learned of Egypt's modest war strategy, it ordered an "immediate continuous action" against the Syrian military. According to Patrick Seale, "For three days, 7, 8, and 9 October, Syrian troops on the Golan faced the full fury of the Israeli air force as, from first light to nightfall, wave after wave of aircraft swooped down to bomb, strafe and napalm their tank concentration and their fuel and ammunition carriers right back to the Purple Line."

In contract to the Six-Day War, the Syrian Arab Army was not routed. As Egypt withdrew from the war signing unilateral agreements with Israel, Assad continued a war of attrition against Israel, inflicting losses and blocking any increase in Israeli gains. Assad's skill as a cool, proud, tough, and shrewd negotiator in the post-war period enabled him to gain the town of Kuneitra and the respect and admiration of many Arabs. Assad signed a disengagement agreement with Israel only in May 1974, emerging from the war as a resilient and strong player. Propaganda and cult of personality portrayed this war as a clear victory for Assad. Many of his followers now regarded Assad as the new pan-Arab leader, and a worthy successor of Gamal Abdel Nasser.

== Events ==
The raising of the flag took place after the handover of Quneitra to Syria on 26 June 1974. When President Hafez al-Assad traveled to Quneitra, he also promised to bring the rest of the occupied territories under Syrian control. As TIME magazine declared, "The recovery of the ruined city—a symbol of Damascus’ determination to win back all the land it lost to Israel in the Six-Day War—touched off a day of emotional national celebration."

TIME correspondent Karsten Prager described that event as follows:

"As the Israelis withdrew from their salient inside Syria, thousands of refugees flocked south on the Damascus-Quneitra road to return to their land. When the day finally arrived for the takeover of the capital itself, thousands were packed along the dusty highway, waiting for the barriers to open. Damascus' understandable determination to celebrate "the liberation of Quneitra" added more confusion to an already massive logistical problem. Thousands of Ba'ath party faithful, as well as plain sightseers, trucked and bused toward Quneitra, their vehicles festooned with Syrian flags and homemade banners. A traffic jam several miles long stalled hundreds of official limousines, military vehicles, donkey carts and trucks piled with returning refugees, stoves, bedrolls and furniture. Red-bereted military police struggled to bring order out of chaos, occasionally shooting their AK-47 automatic rifles into the air to get attention. Reminders of the October fighting were plentiful. Occasionally across the fertile plain came the echoing thump of detonating mines. A prairie fire, ignited by exploding ordnance, cast a gray pall over the land."

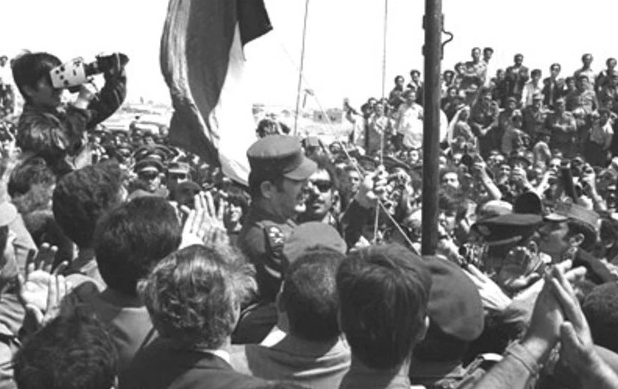
Another photo of raising flag

However, the city of Quneitra was heavily damaged during the war. Western reporters accompanied Syrian refugees returning to the city in early July 1974 and described what they saw on the ground. A TIME correspondent reported that "Most of its buildings are knocked flat, as though by dynamite, or pockmarked by shellfire." But president Hafez al-Assad soon arrived, dressed in military uniform and surrounded by army officers. His arrival greatly excited the assembled crowd, whose joy had cooled when they saw the devastated city - they applauded him, threw flowers at him and chanted slogans in his support ("Welcome Assad, the liberator!"). In front of his citizens and television cameras, Assad kissed the Syrian flag and raised it on a flagpole. After raising the flag, he told the cheering crowd: “No force on earth can prevent us from recovering our rights. We must continue to prepare to oust the enemy from our occupied Arab territory and I am optimistic over victory and the future.” According to some news reports, approximately 20,000 people gathered in the square where the flag was raised.

Ultimately, due to the catastrophic level of destruction, the city's recapture became a purely symbolic event and Quneitra was never rebuilt or restored into the city it was before the war. By some estimates, Israel destroyed over 10,000 buildings in the Quneitra.

== Use in propaganda ==
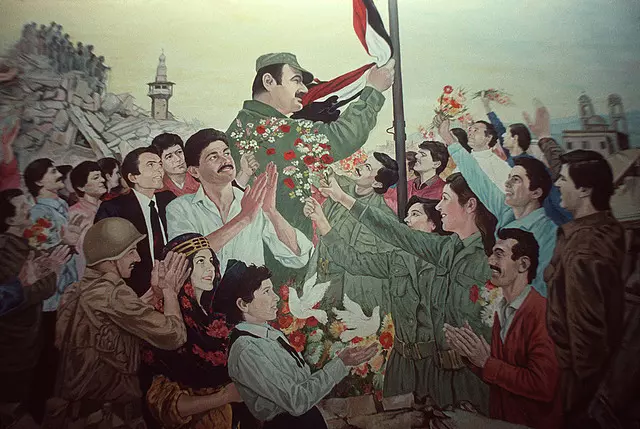
Propaganda fresco, showing the moment of raising the flag

The moment of the raising of the national flag over Quneitra, and the Syrian citizens' celebration around the president, was actively and continually used by state propaganda, and the event would also contribute to the personality cult of President Assad. The day - June 26 - was frequently celebrated and remembered in Ba'athist propaganda becoming a symbol of Syria's "victory" (according to the propaganda) in the war. Video clips of the raising of the flag regularly appeared on state television accompanied by patriotic music.

This event was compared in its symbolism to the raising of the flag over the Reichstag, and symbolized Syria's readiness and determination to liberate all of the Golan Heights. After the war, the October War Panorama museum, dedicated to remembering the Israeli war, was opened in Damascus and it included a fresco painted to remember the specific moment that the Syrian flag was raised in Quneitra.

== See also ==
- Assadism
- Assadization
