= Bashan salient =

Territory in Syria

The Bashan Salient (Hebrew: המובלעת הסורית, romanized: Ha-Muvla'at Ha-Surit, lit. 'The Syrian Enclave') is a territory in Southwestern Syria which was conquered by the Israeli Army during the 1973 Yom Kippur War. The salient was about twenty kilometres wide and encompassed an area of approximately 400 km^{2}, extending to a point 33 kilometres from the Syrian capital of Damascus. The Salient was evacuated by the Israeli army shortly after the signing of a disengagement agreement between the Israeli and Syrian forces on May 31, 1974. The Salient included the summit of Mount Hermon, the town of Beit Jinn, and many other Syrian villages.

Since December 2024, the salient is partially under the control of Israel following the Fall of the Assad regime and the subsequent Israeli invasion.

== Conquest ==
By October 11, 1973, the sixth day of the Yom Kippur War, the Israel Defense Force (IDF) contained the Syrian offensive in the Golan Heights and began a counteroffensive. The 36th division, led by Rafael Eitan, broke through the Syrian lines and passed the Purple Line, advancing to Beit Jinn. The following day, the 36th and 210th divisions continued toward Damascus while the Syrian Air Force conducted airstrikes to halt the Israeli advance. These strikes managed to slow the Israeli forces, with nine Syrian and two Israeli aircraft downed in aerial dogfights and anti-aircraft fire. An expeditionary force of the Iraqi army, which had arrived at the front a day earlier, opened a counteroffensive against two Israeli divisions in Syrian territory. The battle lasted until the following day and halted the advance of the 210th division, which had to reposition its forces to meet the Iraqi attack.

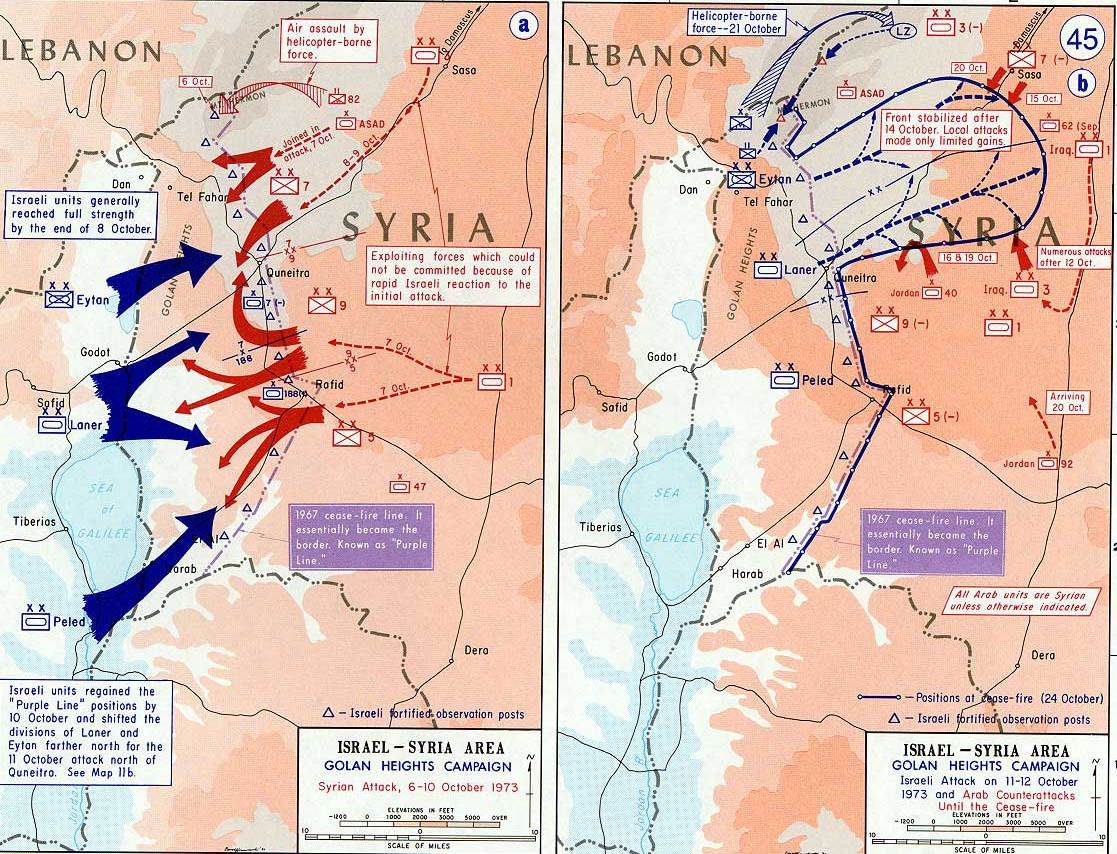
Left: Syrian offensive and Israeli counterattack in the Golan Heights. Right: Creation of the salient

On October 13, the Syrian air force continued its efforts to neutralize the Israeli threat to Damascus, launching more than 100 strikes on Israeli units. In some of these strikes, Syrian and Iraqi forces were hit by mistake, including ten Syrian aircraft which were lost. During this time, the 210th Israeli division ambushed Iraqi forces with some success. On the morning of October 16, a combined Syrian, Iraqi, and Jordanian armoured force attacked Israeli forces in the Salient, with the Syrians attacking from the north, the Iraqis from the east, and the 40th Jordanian armoured brigade from the southeast. This attack was repelled by the Israeli forces. As a result of the constant attack in an exposed Salient, the Israeli forces abandoned their plan to continue their push toward Damascus. From October 19 to 20, the Salient perimeter experienced continuous fighting between the opposing sides.

On the night of October 21, Israeli forces captured the Hermon outposts in a dual operation. The 1st Golani Brigade reclaimed the Israeli outpost, which had been taken by Syrian commandos on the first day of the war. At the same time, fighters of a reserve paratrooper brigade captured the Syrian outpost near the summit. This summit outpost was held until the armistice despite numerous Syrian attempts to retake it.

The Syrians prepared for a massive counteroffensive, scheduled to occur on October 23, to drive Israeli forces out of Syria. A total of five Syrian divisions were to take part, alongside the Iraqi and Jordanian expeditionary forces. The day before the offensive was to begin, the United Nations imposed a ceasefire following the acquiescence of both Israel and Egypt. Ultimately, Syrian President Hafez al-Assad decided to cancel the offensive. On October 23, the day the offensive was to begin, Syria announced it had accepted the ceasefire and ordered its troops to cease hostilities. The Iraqi government ordered its forces home.

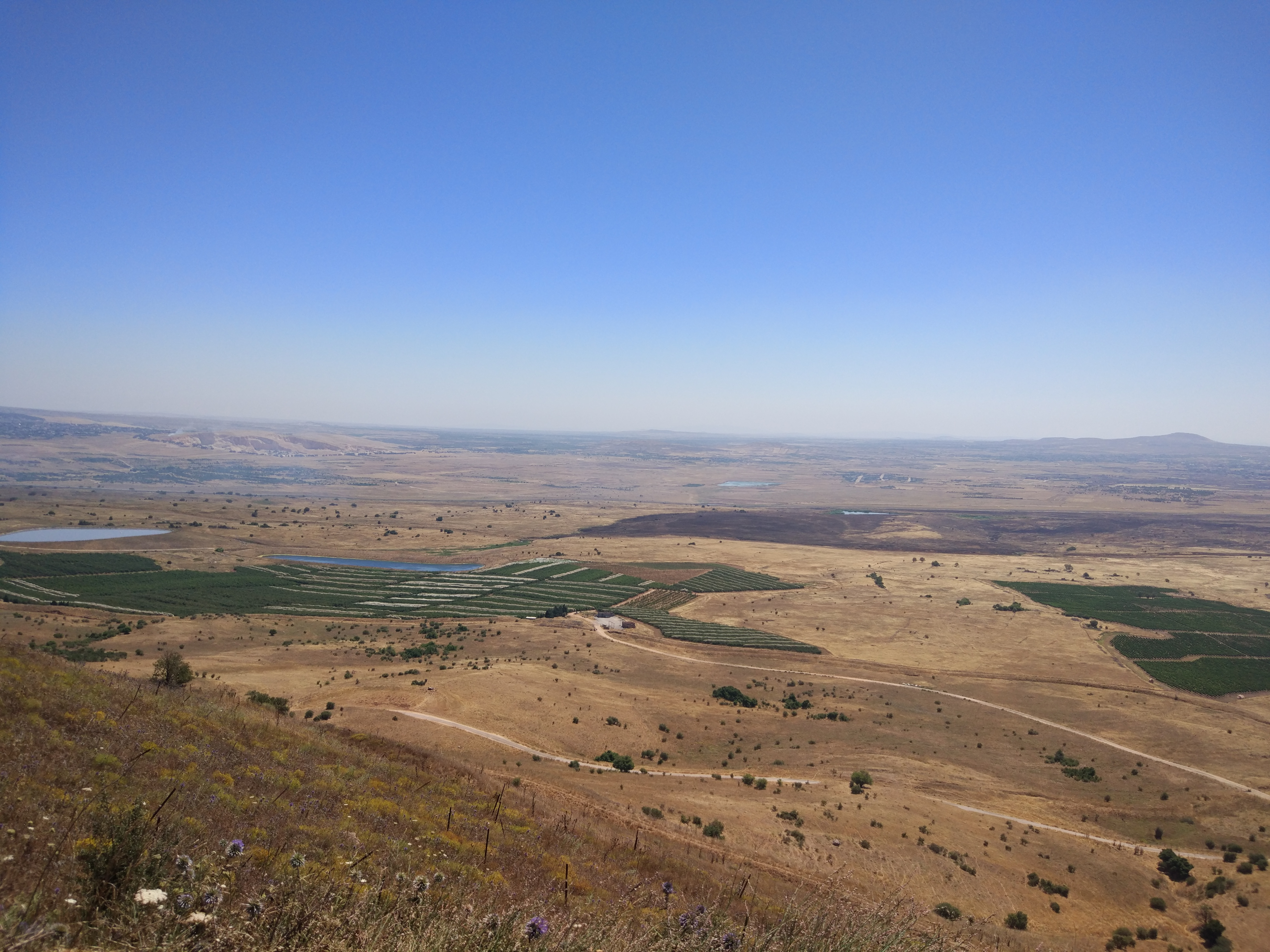
The central area of the Salient in 2018.

== Attrition ==
The Syrians, refusing to accept the presence of Israeli military forces in their territory, continued to harass the IDF during early 1974, with almost daily attacks. By March 1974, the conflict had become a war of attrition subsequently deemed in Israel as the "War of Attrition in the Bashan Salient" or the "Little War of Attrition" (to differentiate it from the War of Attrition fought between Israel and Egypt in 1969–1970). The Syrian army mainly employed artillery bombardments with some attacks by armoured and infantry units also taking place. Between March and May 1974, more than 1,000 such incidents had occurred with some Israeli civilian settlements in the Golan Heights also coming under Syrian fire. The fighting took place alongside armistice negotiations, which started in February 1974 with U.S. Secretary of State Henry Kissinger serving as a go-between. An armistice agreement was finally signed on May 31, 1974, with the Israelis evacuating the Salient shortly after and UN peacekeeping forces (UNDOF) taking a position on a thin strip of land between the opposing sides. This agreement is still in place today but only on a theoretical basis, since as of December 2024 the Assad regime been overthrown in Syria, and the Israeli army has taken full control of the UNDOF demilitarized zone.
