= War of Attrition in the Bashan Salient =

Armed conflict between Israel and Syria, 1974

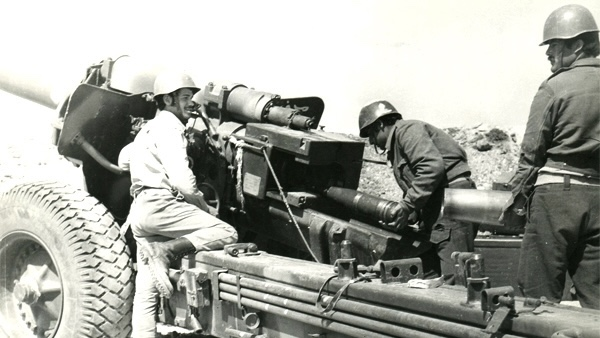
Syrian artillery crew during the October war, 1973-1974.

The War of Attrition in the Bashan Salient was an armed conflict between Israel and Syria in the Bashan Salient from March through May 1974. The region was conquered by the Israeli army (IDF) at the end of the Yom Kippur War in October 1973, and held by Israeli forces until the signing of the disengagement agreement on May 31, 1974, that saw the evacuation of all Israeli forces and the Bashan Salient returned to Syria.

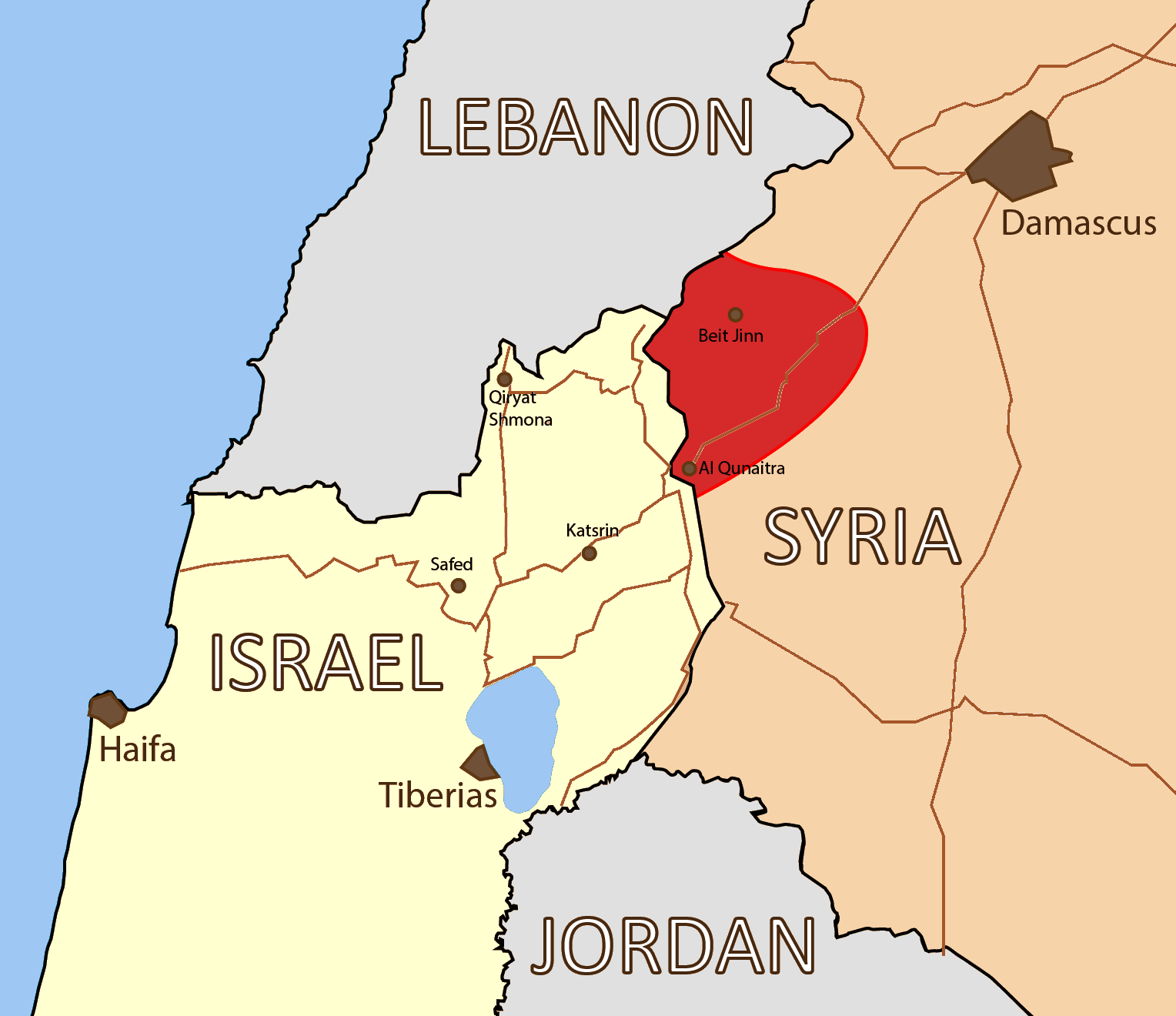
The Salient held by Israel shown in Crimson

== History ==
=== Israeli occupation of the Salient: October 1973 ===
By the time the second ceasefire was imposed to end the Yom Kippur War, the IDF had conquered a 400 km^{2} salient into Syria. Known as the Bashan Salient due to its location in the Bashan region, the Israeli salient included many Syrian villages and several key military outputs. Most notably, it included several positions on Mount Hermon, which were within artillery range of the Syrian capital of Damascus.

=== Low-intensity conflict: November 1973 – March 1974 ===
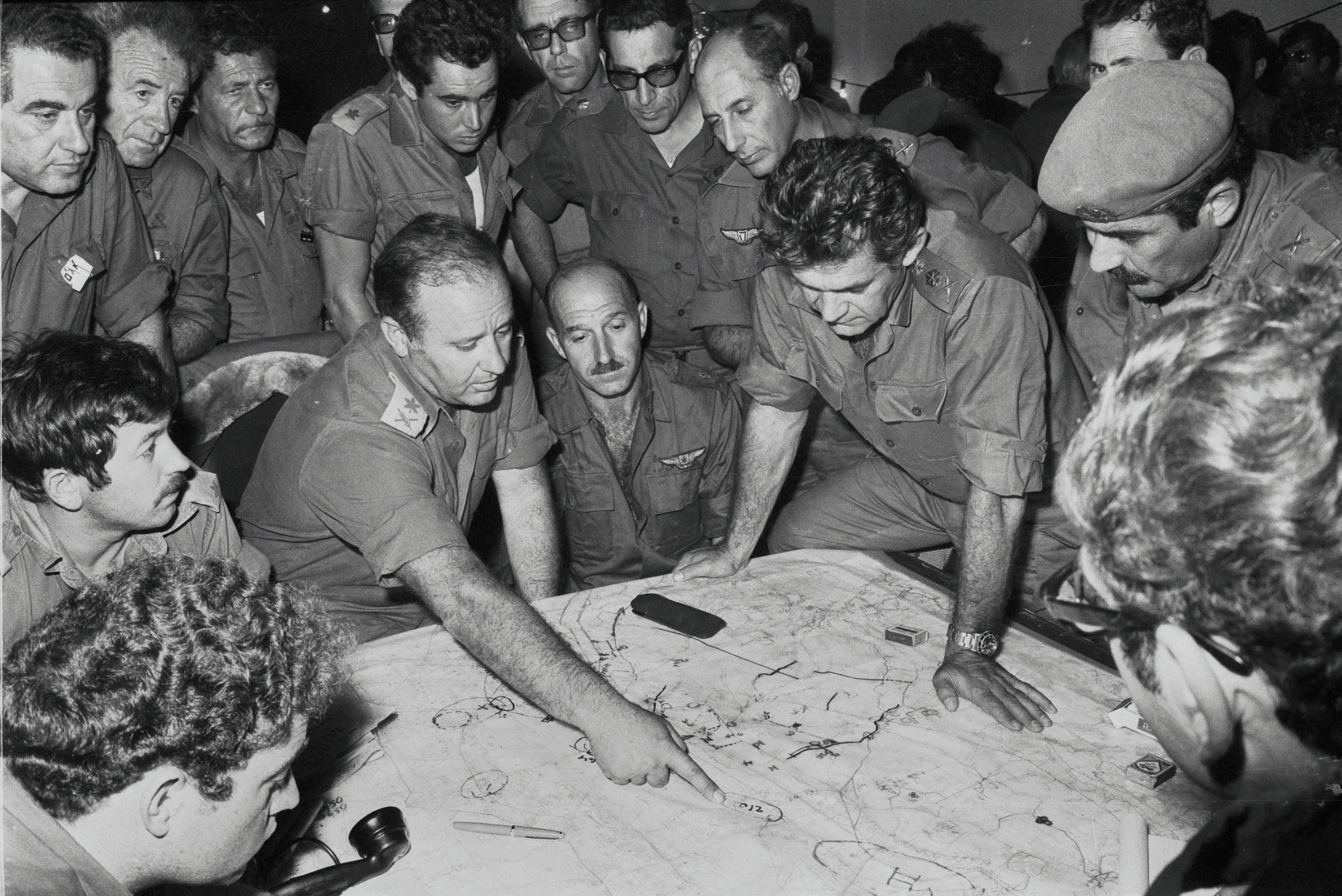
Consultation at Northern Command, October 10, 1973. Head of Northern Command Yitzhak Hofi is pointing at the map, while IDF Chief of Staff David Elazar is leaning on the map with both hands

The Syrians, having lost strategic outposts on Mount Hermon in the Yom Kippur War and with their capital threatened, refused to accept the presence of Israeli troops on their soil. Despite the existing ceasefire, Syrian forces led numerous ambushes and firefights against the Israeli salient. According to Syrian Foreign Minister Abdel Halim Khaddam, Syria's constant artillery attacks were "part of a deliberate war of attrition designed to paralyze the Israeli economy", and were intended to pressure Israel into yielding the occupied territory. Aerial engagements also took place, and both sides lost several aircraft during the escalating conflict.

=== War of attrition: March – May 1974 ===
In February 1974, negotiations between Israel and Syria began under the mediation of Henry Kissinger, the US Secretary of State. Alongside these negotiations, the fight went on, slowly growing in intensity, with over 1,000 incidents between March and May. The Israelis called these incidents, which included the shelling of Israeli civilian settlements in Golan territory, the "War of Attrition in the Syrian Salient" or the "Little War of Attrition", to distinguish from the War of Attrition against Egypt in 1969–70.

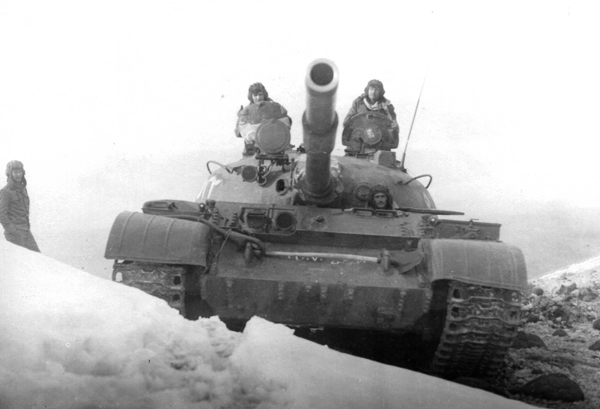
Syrian T-62 tank during the war of atrittion.The tank appears to have been delivered by the Soviet Union quite recently: it doesn't even have the standard Syrian army camouflage.

Due to harsh winter weather and logistical difficulties, the Israeli army removed the permanent garrison on Hermon Summit's outpost, relying on occasional patrols to secure the asset. The vacating of the outpost was noticed by the Syrians, who started paving a road toward the summit in late March 1974. For the two months of April and May 1974, in parallel to the armistice negotiations, the conflict in the salient escalated to days of almost full combat. On April 6, 1974, Israeli observation posts observed that Syrian commando forces had scaled the non-garrisoned Hermon summit. The IDF retaliated with artillery and airstrikes, and on that same night, a small Israeli force reached the summit and claimed it after a short firefight. After this incident, Israeli forces equipped for the harsh weather conditions were permanently stationed at the outpost. These forces took shelter in a natural cave near the summit.

On April 16, 1974, the Israeli Engineering Corps completed a paved road to the summit, even while suffering heavy Syrian artillery bombardment, with a D-9 tractor becoming the first mechanized vehicle to ever reach the peak. After the road was complete, Israeli tanks and APCs were placed at the outpost, and its defenses were fortified. These armored vehicles would prove crucial in repelling Syrian attacks on the Israeli outpost on April 18–19, and again on April 22. Several aerial dogfights also took place over the salient at this time, with both sides losing aircraft.

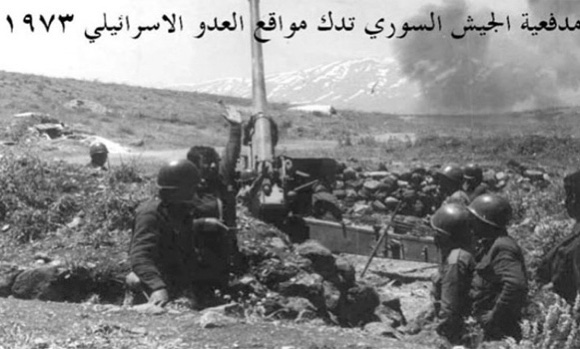
Syrian artillery during the fighting.

On April 27, 1974, the Syrians shelled one of the forts on the summit, killing eight Israeli soldiers and wounding seven. An Israeli Yas'ur helicopter sent to evacuate the wounded soldiers crashed on the mountain, killing the six crew members. The Syrians also shelled the surrounding forts, as well as the daily convoys bringing men and equipment. The Israeli Air Force retaliated with airstrikes on Syrian army camps on the slopes of the mountain. On May 1–2, 1974, Syrian commandos raided an Israeli tank park, killing two Israeli soldiers and taking several others prisoner. This raid proved to be the final Syrian military action in the salient.

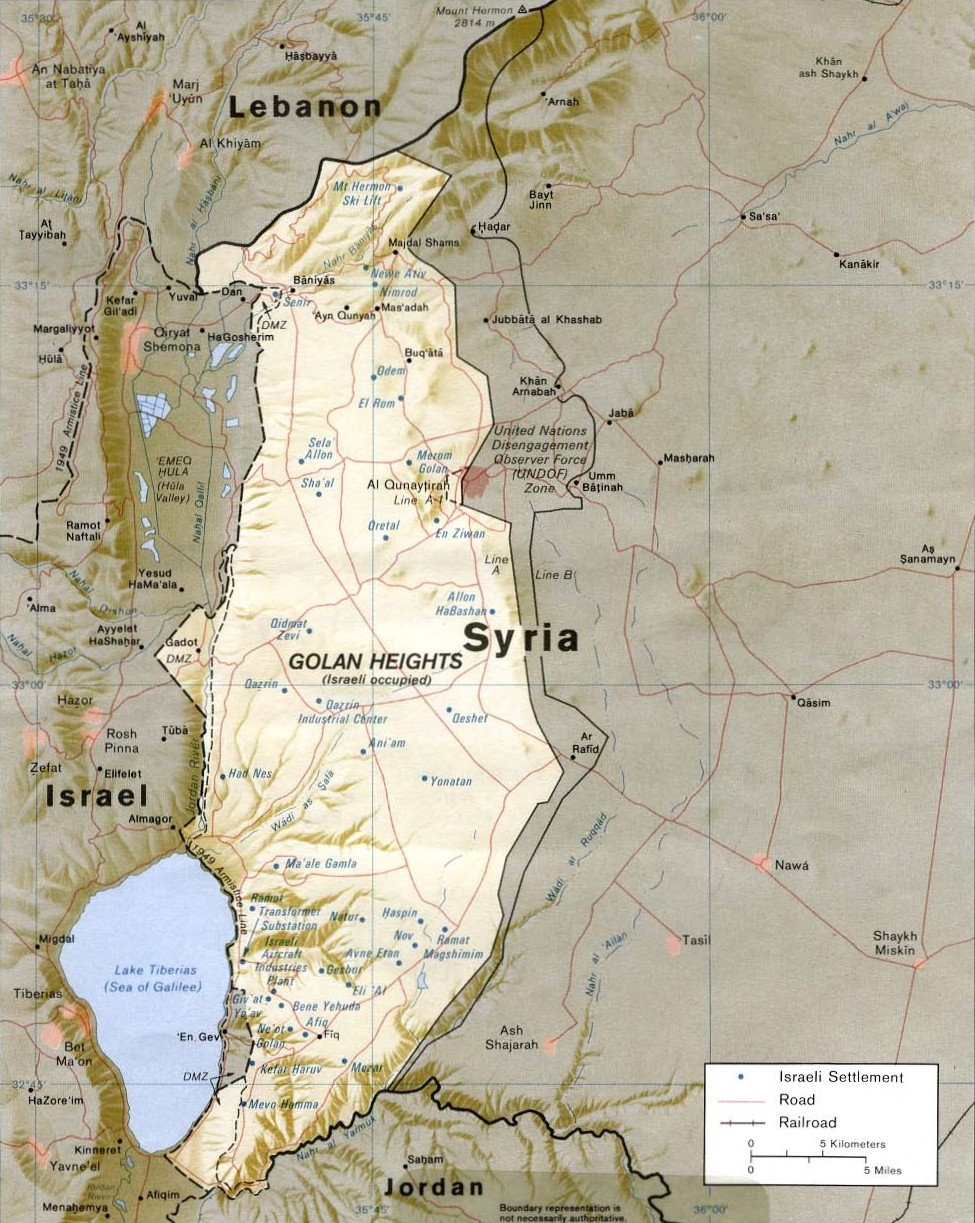
Golan Heights

Yom Kippur War ribbon

=== The signing of the armistice ===
On May 31, 1974, a disengagement agreement was signed between Israel and Syria. In line with the agreement, Israel evacuated all its forces from Syrian territory, including the Hermon Summit outpost, in the following three weeks. Israeli forces returned to the pre-war Purple Line, which remained the de facto border between the countries, except for minor changes such as Israel's handing the abandoned city of Quneitra to the Syrians. A buffer zone was created on the Syrian side of the border held by UNDOF, a UN peace-keeping force, with Syria retaining the civil administration. In December 2024, amid the fall of the Assad regime in Syria, Israel invaded Syria and occupied areas in the buffer zone and beyond.

=== Campaign medal ===
Israeli soldiers who served in the Bashan Salient for a period of at least 18 continuous days received the Yom Kippur War medal and ribbon.
