= Agreement on Disengagement between Israel and Syria =

Israeli–Syrian ceasefire after the Yom Kippur War

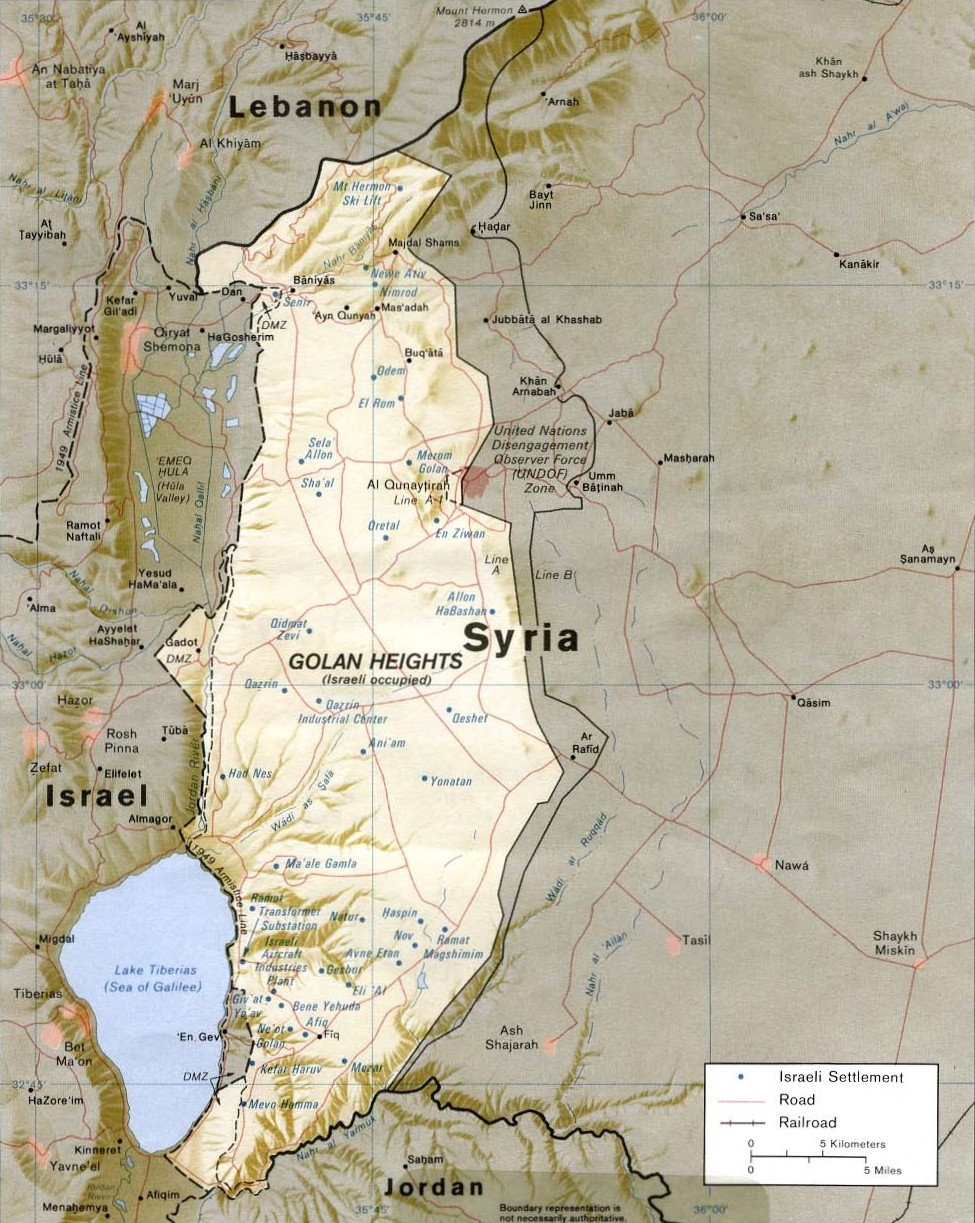
Sites on the Golan in blue are Israeli settlements. Sites on the Golan in black are Syrian villages. Areas of the Golan occupied by Israel are light-coloured while those under Syrian control are grey.

The Agreement on Disengagement between Israel and Syria, which was signed on May 31, 1974, provided for the continuation of the cease-fire already in effect and for the separation of opposing parties by a UN Peacekeeping Force. The Agreement specifically states that “H. This agreement is not a peace agreement. It is a step toward a just and durable peace on the basis of Security Council Resolution 338 dated October 22, 1973.”

Fifty years later, following the fall of the Assad regime, Israel said it "considered the agreement void until order is restored in Syria", leading to the 2024 Israeli invasion of Syria. Syrian president Ahmed al-Sharaa reaffirmed his government's commitment to the agreement and entered negotiations for a new security arrangement with Israel in the Golan Heights.

== Background ==
At cease of fire in the Yom Kippur War, Israel had gained control over the pre-war Golan Heights, as well as a substantial portion that Syria had controlled before the war. The newly conquered territory lay east of the northern Golan, along a roughly 20 kilometres (12 mi)-wide strip leading towards Damascus, ending only 40 kilometres (25 mi) from the city. The 400 square kilometres (150 sq mi) in that area contained many small Syrian villages as well as the volcanic cone and peak of Hermon mountain.

Even though the temporary ceasefire was made official, both sides kept exchanging fire, bringing the situation into attrition warfare. It continued throughout the negotiation process, and became more intense every time it was interrupted. Negotiations were repeatedly initiated by the United Nations Security Council Resolution 339, inasmuch as from its very start there were multiple disputes over procedure. Furthermore, the attrition grew more intense as the Agreement on Disengagement between Israel and Egypt was finally signed in January 1974.

Israel demanded that a list of its captives held in Syria be released as a condition for re-opening the negotiations, and asked that they be allowed to receive medical treatment from the Red Cross if needed. Syria denied the request, demanding territorial compensation in exchange. U.S. Secretary of State Henry Kissinger, came for a short shuttling journey between Jerusalem and Damascus in February 1974 (he later wrote in his memoirs that he had decided to mediate due to pressure from the Egyptian President Anwar Sadat and ruler of Saudi Arabia, who wished to bring both the Yom Kippur War and the oil crisis to an end). On February 27, Kissinger returned from Damascus with a list of prisoners, following a promise given to the Syrians that Quneitra will be given back to them, and then began formal negotiations.

Attrition warfare greatly increased in the coming months, and between March and May there were over a thousand different incidents, including heavy bombings on cities in the Golan as well as constant fire at Israel Defense Forces, and battles over the control of Mount Hermon. Throughout this period, fears that the battles will become a full-scale war delayed the release of reserve units in months. Syrians demanded Israeli withdrawal from large territories in the Golan which they had lost.

Eventually Israel agreed to withdraw from all the territories occupied during the war, consisting of approximately 25 square kilometres (9.7 sq mi) on the Israeli side of the Purple Line (1967 armistice line). In exchange, a 235 square kilometer (146 sq mi) United Nations Disengagement Observer Force Zone was formed on the Syrian side of that line. According to testimonies of the participants in the negotiations, there were bargainings about the smallest detail until the agreement was signed in Geneva on May 31, 1974 (more than seven months after the ceasefire declaration). The negotiations led to numerous misunderstandings and indirectly caused the crises of fire incidents, such as when Israel agreed to give back Syria the control over Quneitra, Syria interpreted it as if the area referred to included the Avital and Bental mountains, whilst Israel intended only to the area of the city itself. The negotiations went on with continued U.S. pressure on Israel.

== Details and implementation ==
It was decided in the agreement that the two countries will maintain the ceasefire and immediately return prisoners of war on both sides. Then, it said, Israel will withdraw from all the enclaved areas and the Hermon top it occupied during the war, and a surface of about 25 km^{2} around the city of Quneitra and other small areas occupied during the Six-Day War. Finally, two separation lines were put into place: Israeli (marked in blue) and Syrian (marked in red), including a 235 km^{2} United Nations Disengagement Observer Force buffer zone on the Syrian side.

The agreement stated that the Syrian civilians that were forced to leave their homes in the buffer zone will be able to return to them, as it pledged to fight terrorist activities in the Golan Heights. These two undertakings were given as an oral commitment to the United States. Following the agreement was the establishment of the United Nations Disengagement Observer Force buffer zone, which appointed 1,043 soldiers to oversee the buffer zone.

Prisoners were returned immediately after the signing of the agreement (June 1–6, 1974), and Israel withdrew from Mount Hermon and the enclave areas. The new separation line was completed on June 26, 1974.

== Violations by Israel ==
The disengagement between Israel and Syria, which had been in place for more than 50 years, was disrupted by Israel after the fall of the Assad regime in 2024, leading to regular Israeli incursions into Syrian territory.. This included occupying parts of the United Nations Disengagement Observer Force buffer zone.

== See also ==
- 1949 Armistice Agreements
