= Purple Line (ceasefire line) =

De facto border between Israel and Syria since the 1967 Six-Day War

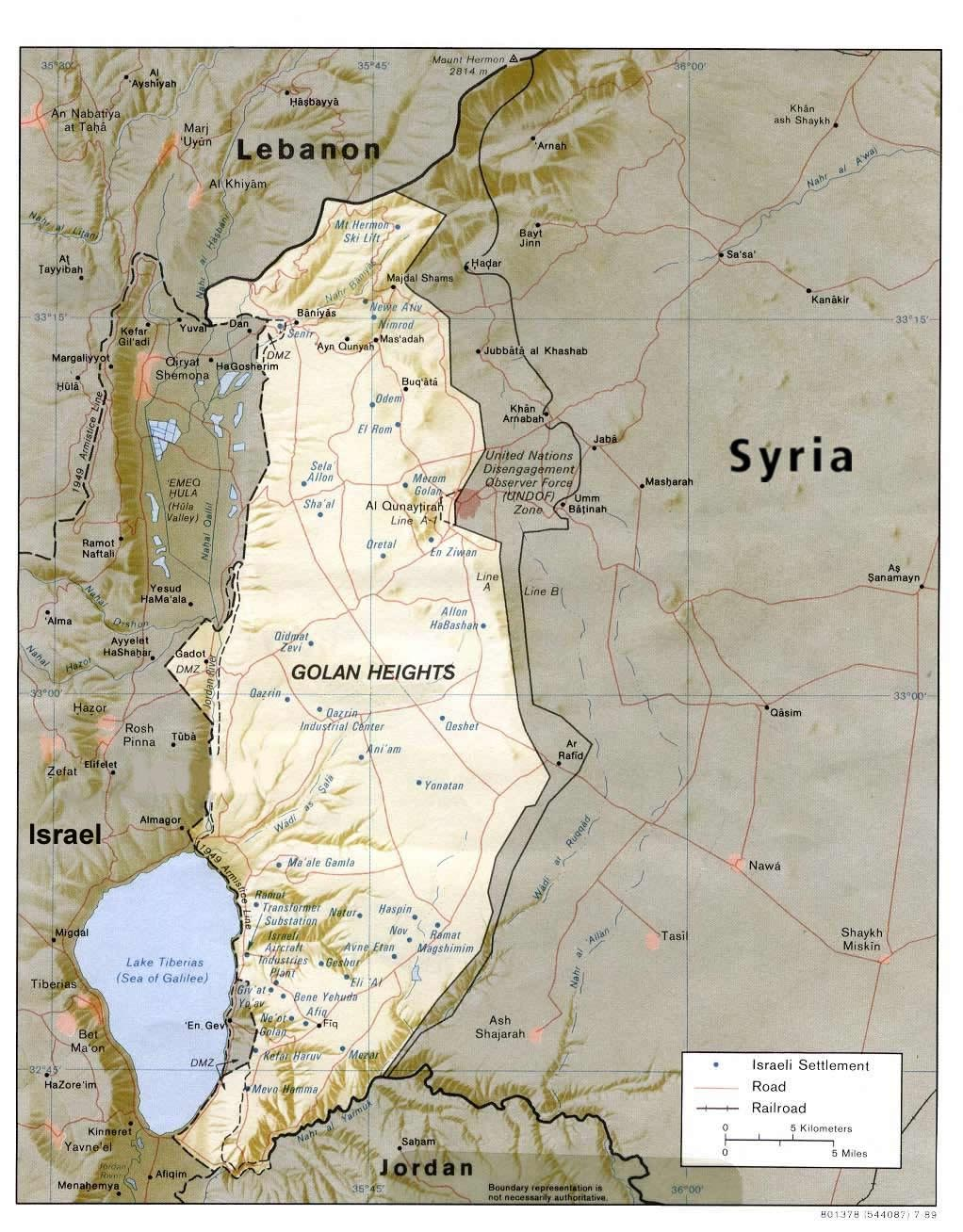
The UNDOF Zone (Purple Line) in the Golan Heights serves as the de facto border between Israel and Syria

The Purple Line was the ceasefire line between Israel and Syria after the 1967 Six-Day War which serves as the de facto border between the two countries today. Following the fall of the Assad regime in 2024, Israel broke the Purple Line during its invasion of Syria.

== History ==
Syria gained independence from France in 1946 and on 14 May 1948, the British withdrew from Palestine as Israel declared its independence. Syrian forces participated in the 1948 Arab–Israeli War between Arab forces and the newly established State of Israel. In 1949, armistice agreements were signed and a provisional border between Syria and Israel was delineated (based on the 1923 international border; see San Remo conference). Syrian and Israeli forces clashed on numerous occasions in the spring of 1951. The hostilities, which stemmed from Syrian opposition to an Israeli drainage project in the demilitarized zone, ceased on 15 May, after intercession by the United Nations Security Council.

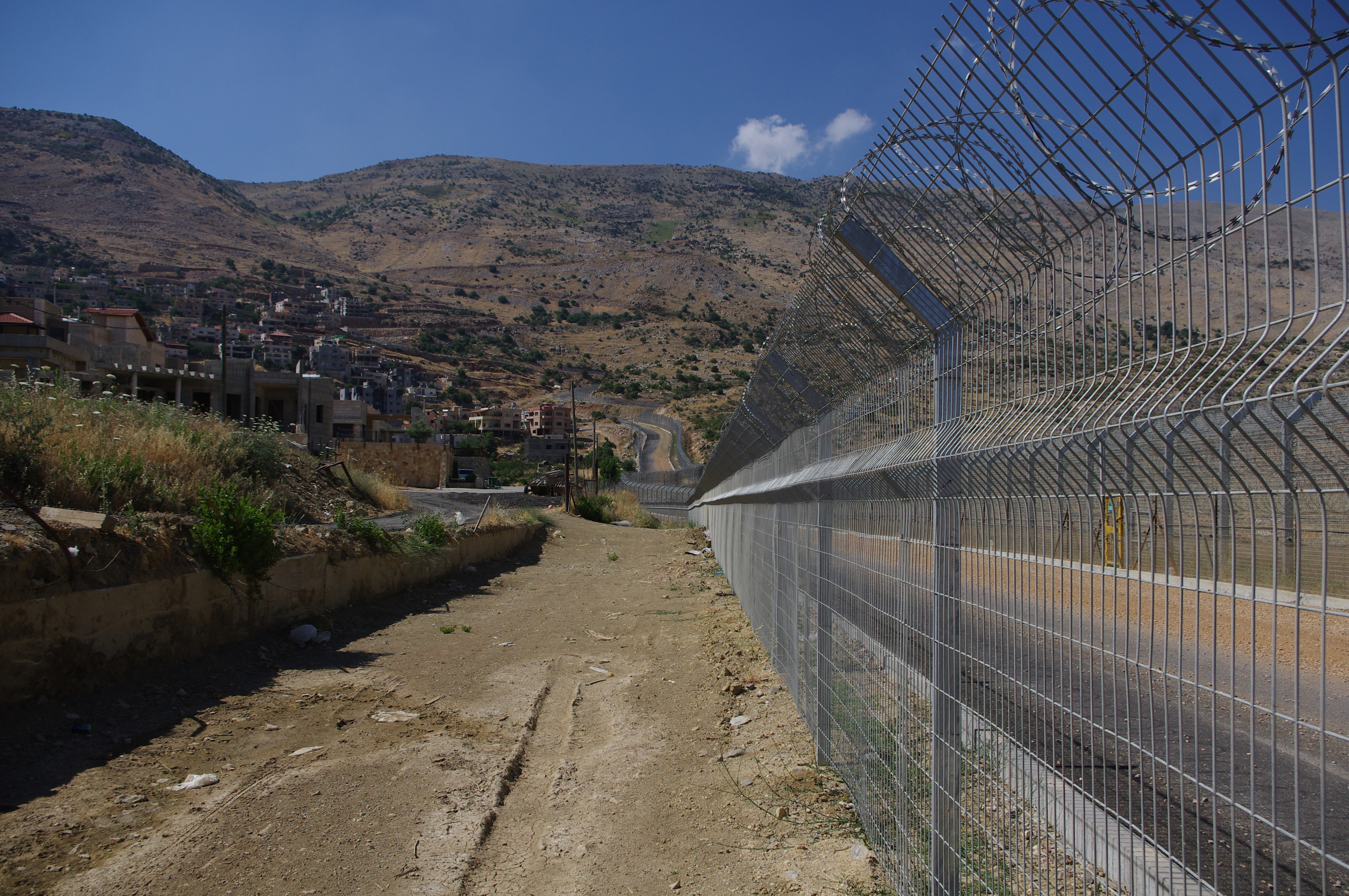
The Purple Line through Majdal Shams in the Golan Heights

In June 1967 after battling Syria, Jordan and Egypt in the Six-Day War, Israel captured the entire length of the Golan Heights including its principal city Quneitra. The resulting ceasefire line (dubbed the "Purple Line" as it was drawn on the UN's maps) was supervised by a series of positions and observation posts staffed by observers of the United Nations Truce Supervision Organization and became the new effective border between Israel and Syria.

In a surprise attack consisting of a massive armored thrust, the Syrians crossed the Purple Line into the Golan Heights during the 1973 Yom Kippur War. After several days of very heavy fighting on the Golan they were pushed back deep into Syria and Israel conquered further territory inside Syria beyond the Purple Line by the time a ceasefire was reached. In the disengagements negotiations after the war, Israel and Syria agreed on 31 May 1974, to pull back their respective forces on the Golan Heights to the Purple Line. On the same day, a United Nations buffer zone was set up and the United Nations Disengagement Observer Force Zone (UNDOF) was established by the United Nations after the adoption of UN Security Council Resolution 350.

== 2024 Israeli invasion of Syria ==
On 8 December 2024, Israel invaded the buffer zone in southwestern Syria adjacent to the Israeli-occupied Golan Heights, and carried out an aerial campaign targeting the Syrian Army's military capabilities, following the fall of the Assad regime.

== See also ==
- Agreement on Disengagement between Israel and Syria
- Blue Line (Lebanon)
- Green Line (Israel)
- Green Line (Lebanon)
- Yellow Line
