= Ahmad al-Sayyed =

Syrian politician

His Excellency Ahmad al-Sayyed
- أحمد السيد

Minister of Justice
- In office 30 August 2020 – 10 December 2024
- President: Bashar al-Assad
- Prime Minister: Hussein Arnous; Mohammad Ghazi al-Jalali
- Preceded by: Hisham Al Shaar
- Succeeded by: Shadi al-Waisi

Personal details
- Born: 1965 (age 60–61) Quneitra, Quneitra Governorate, Syria
- Party: Independent
- Children: 4
- Education: University of Damascus

Ahmad Awad al-Sayyed (Arabic: أحمد عوض السيد) is a Syrian politician who served as minister of justice, he was a member of the Cabinet of Syria.

== Political career ==
He was appointed minister of justice in the First Hussein Arnous government in 2020. In 2021 he was reappointed to the role in the Second Hussein Arnous government.

He has carried out an agenda of judicial reform.
