= United Nations Disengagement Observer Force =

Peacekeeping mission overseeing Israeli–Syrian ceasefire

Coordinates: 33°7′N 35°52′E

- UNDOF deployment
- Abbreviation: UNDOF
- Formation: 31 May 1974
- Type: Peacekeeping mission
- Legal status: Active (occupied by Israel)
- Headquarters: Camp Faouar, Syria
- Head: Anita Asmah
- Parent organization: UN Security Council
- Website: undof.unmissions.org

The United Nations Disengagement Observer Force (UNDOF) is a United Nations peacekeeping mission tasked with maintaining the ceasefire between Israel and Syria in the aftermath of the 1973 Yom Kippur War. The mission was established by United Nations Security Council Resolution 350 on 31 May 1974, to implement Resolution 338 (1973) which called for an immediate ceasefire and implementation of United Nations Security Council Resolution 242.

The resolution was passed on the same day as the Agreement on Disengagement. It was signed by Israeli and Syrian forces on the Golan Heights, finally establishing a ceasefire to end the war. From 1974 to 2012, UNDOF performed its functions with the full cooperation of both sides. Since 1974 its mandate has been renewed every six months. The United Nations Truce Supervision Organization (UNTSO) and UNDOF operate in the UNDOF Zone, a demilitarized zone between the two sides and continue to supervise the ceasefire.

Before the Syrian Civil War, the situation in the Israel-Syria ceasefire line had remained quiet and there had been few serious incidents. During the Syrian Civil War, clashes in Quneitra spilt into the buffer zone between Israeli and Syrian forces, forcing many UN observer force-contributing nations to reconsider their mission due to safety issues. Following this, a number of troop-contributing countries withdrew their troops from UNDOF, resulting in a reorganization of the force.

After the fall of the Assad regime in December 2024, Israel invaded the buffer zone. As of January 2025, UNDOF forces remain at their pre-invasion positions and call for a "return to full mandate implementation", but acknowledge the IDF as the "de facto authorities". UNDOF has reported the IDF searches, arrests, and roadblocks to their activities during the occupation. Israel has called its occupation "indefinite". Meanwhile, the UN claims it intervenes "whenever any military personnel enters or [tries] to operate in the area of separation."

== Background ==
On 6 October 1973, in a surprise joint attack, Egypt attacked Israeli forces on the Suez Canal and in the Sinai while Syria attacked Israeli forces on the Golan Heights. Israel eventually repulsed the Syrian operation, and crossed the Suez Canal through a gap between Egyptian forces. Israeli forces then pushed further into Syria, and encircled elements of the Egyptian 3rd Army. Fighting continued until 22 October 1973, when United Nations Security Council Resolution 338 called for a ceasefire. The next day the ceasefire was violated and fighting resumed, resulting in United Nations Security Council Resolution 339. Resolution 339 primarily reaffirmed the terms outlined in Resolution 338 (itself based on Resolution 242). It required the forces of both sides to return to the position they held when the initial ceasefire came into effect, and requested the United Nations Secretary-General to undertake measures toward the placement of observers to supervise the ceasefire.

This second ceasefire was violated as well, specifically by the Egyptian army by crossing the preexisting ceasefire line on October 6, 1973, in Operation Badr. Operation Badr was the start of a wider conflict known as the Yom Kippur War. United Nations Security Council Resolution 340 ended the conflict on October 25, 1973. The United Nations Emergency Force II (UNEF II) moved into place between Israeli and Egyptian armies in the Suez Canal area, stabilizing the situation.

Tension remained high on the Israel-Syria front, and during March 1974 the situation became increasingly unstable. The United States undertook a diplomatic initiative, which resulted in the signing of the "Agreement on Disengagement" (S/11302/Add.1, annexes I and II) between Israeli and Syrian forces. The Agreement provided for a buffer zone and for two equal areas of limitation of forces and armaments on both sides of the area. It also called for the establishment of a United Nations observer force to supervise its implementation. The Agreement was signed on 31 May 1974 and, on the same day, the UN Security Council adopted Resolution 350 to set up UNDOF.

Brigadier General Gonzalo Briceno Zevallos from Peru was appointed as UNDOF's first commander. On 3 June 1974, he arrived at the headquarters of the United Nations Truce Supervision Organization (UNTSO) Israel/Syria Mixed Armistice Commission (ISMAC) House in Damascus and assumed operational command of 90 UNTSO observers detailed to UNDOF. The first phase of the operation was manning the observation posts. The UNTSO observers were transferred to UNDOF, and were joined by advanced parties from both Austria and Peru on 3 June, with Canadian and Polish personnel transferred from UNEF II to the UNDOF Area of Responsibility.

From 6 June 1974 to 25 June 1974, the second phase, which included the physical disengagement of Syrian and Israeli forces, was initiated. According to Canadian veteran Frank Misztal, "the Austrians and Polish shared a base camp at Kanikir near the town of Sassa. The Peruvians were deployed south of Quneitra near Ziouani. The Canadian logistics company and signal element were situated in Ziouani near Quneitra. The force headquarters remained in Damascus".

== History ==
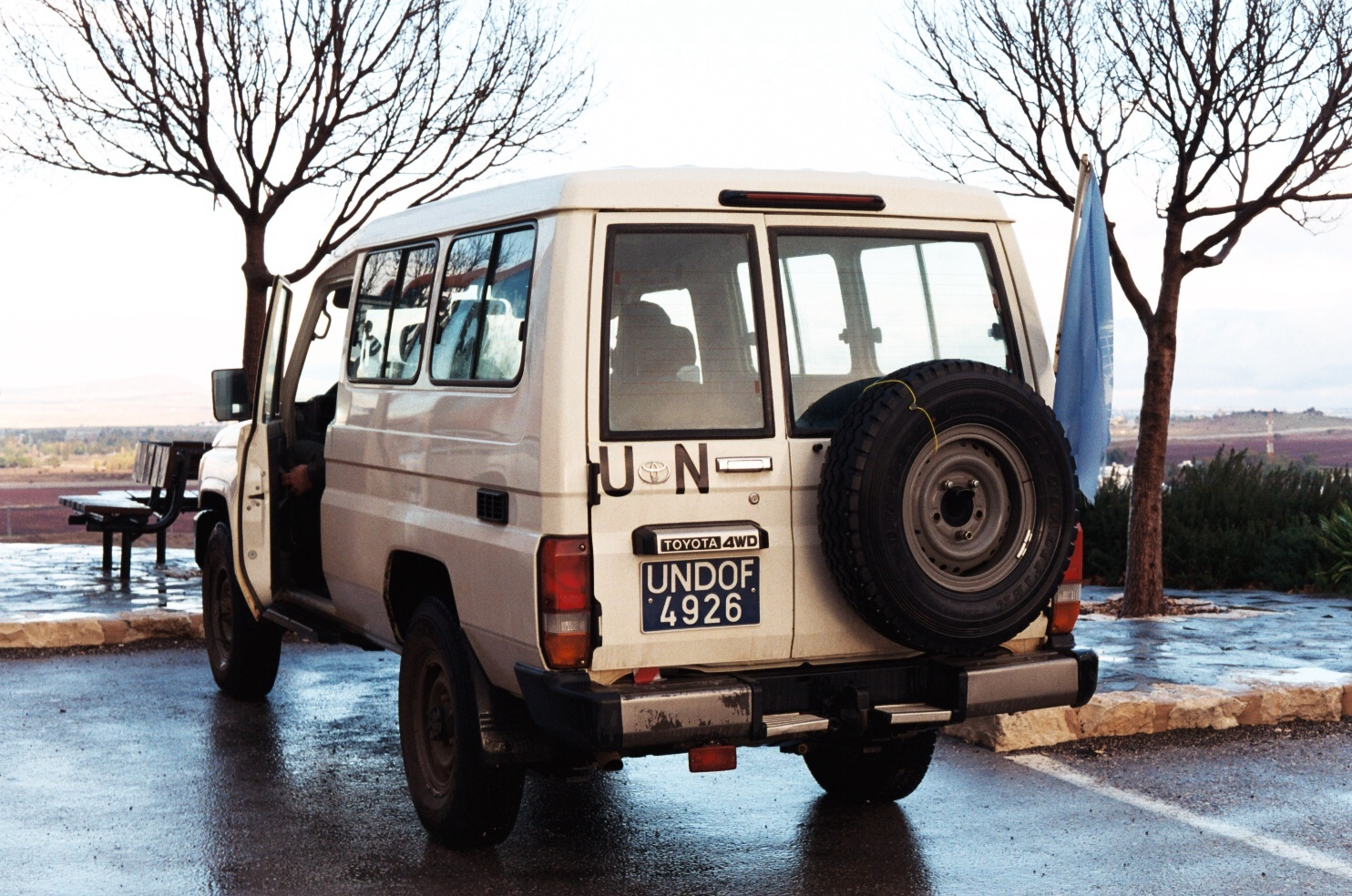
A UNDOF Toyota Land Cruiser parked off Highway 98 near Majdal Shams, displaying UNDOF plates and a UN flag, January 2012

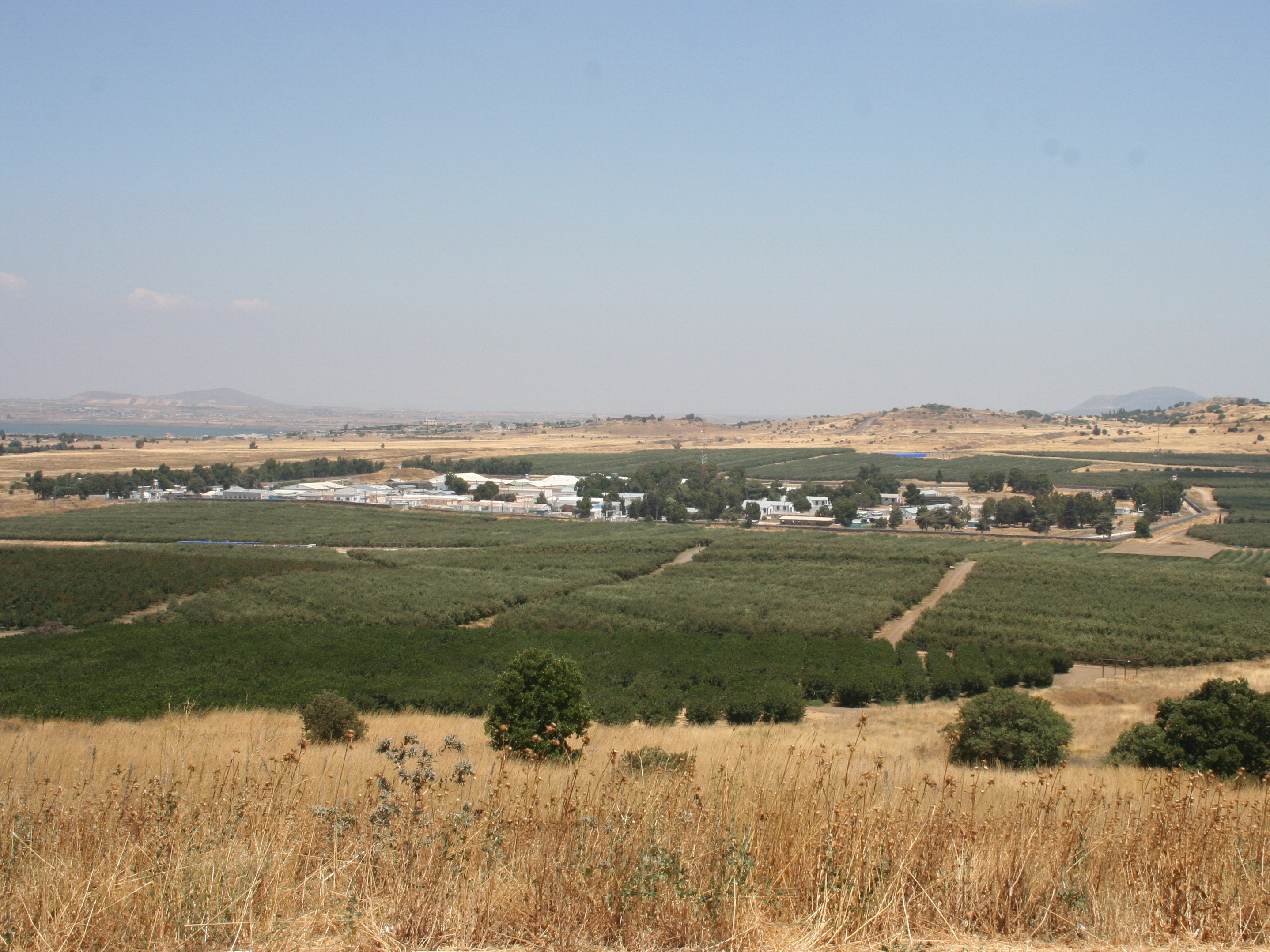
The UNDOF base near the Quneitra Crossing.

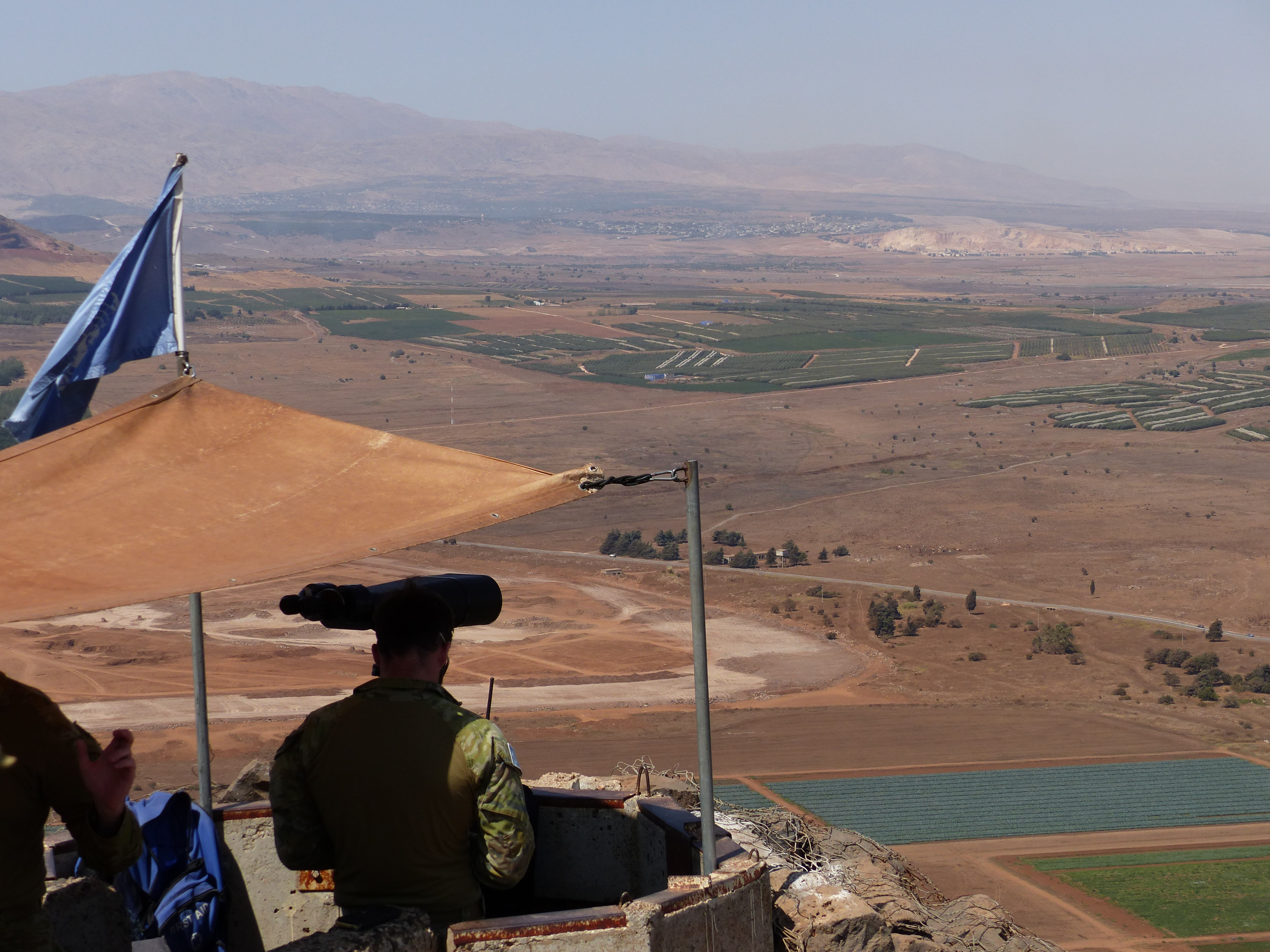
UNDOF position in Mount Bental

The initial composition of UNDOF in 1974 was of personnel from Austria, Peru, Canada and Poland, and later contingents have come from Iran, Finland, Slovenia, Japan, Croatia, India and the Philippines. On 9 August 1974, a Canadian Buffalo transport aircraft (Buffalo 461) was on a routine re-supply flight, from Beirut to Damascus for Canadian peacekeepers in the Golan Heights. Flight 51 was carrying five crew members and four passengers: Capt G.G Foster, Capt K.B. Mirau, Capt R.B. Wicks, MWO G. Landry, A/MWO C.B. Korejwo, MCpl R.C Spencer, Cpl M.H.T. Kennington, Cpl M.W. Simpson and Cpl B.K. Stringer. All were members of the Canadian Forces. At 11:50, while on final approach into Damascus, the aircraft was shot down over the outskirts of the Syrian town of Ad Dimas, killing all on board. This remains the largest single-day loss of life in Canada's peace-keeping history.

Between September 1975 and August 1979, an Iranian battalion was assigned to UNDOF, having replaced the original Peruvian contingent. The Iranians were then replaced by a Finnish battalion. The Finns were then replaced by a Polish battalion in December 1993 after the Poles concluded their initial mission in October of that year. When UNDOF was re-organized in late 1993 (the Finnish Government had decided to pull its troops from UNDOF), the UNDOF HQ moved from Damascus to Camp Faouar in early 1994, the Austrian base camp. A logistics battalion was formed in 1996, when the Japanese deployed a contingent to bolster the Canadian element. The Canadians remained until 2006 when they were replaced by a contingent from India. A Slovak infantry company arrived in 1998, replacing the third company of the Austrian battalion; the Slovaks remained until 2008 when a Croatian company assumed the same role within the Austrian battalion. The following year, the Polish battalion was replaced by a contingent from the Philippines.

The fighting between Syrian Army and Syrian Opposition around Quneitra came to international attention when in March 2013, the al-Qaeda affiliated group al-Nusra Front took 21 Filipino UN Disengagement Observer Force personnel hostage in the neutral buffer zone. According to a UN official, the personnel were taken hostage near Observation Post 58, which had sustained damage and been evacuated the previous weekend, following heavy combat nearby at Al Jamla. The personnel were eventually released, and returned to their base via Jordan and Israel on 12 March.

On 10 May 2013, the Philippine Secretary of Foreign Affairs, Albert del Rosario announced his intentions to pull out their contingent of UN peacekeepers from the UNDOF zone. He suggested the risks in the area had gone "beyond tolerable limits". The announcement followed the kidnapping of four peacekeepers, shown on video to be kept as human shields by the Yarmouk Martyrs Brigade. The total Philippine contingent numbered 342, approximately one third of the UN contingent at the time. On 6 June 2013, the Austrian chancellor Werner Faymann and Austrian foreign minister Michael Spindelegger announced that Austria would withdraw its troops from the UNDOF mission. This decision was made after Syrian rebels had attacked and temporarily captured the border crossing at Quneitra. A Filipino peacekeeper was wounded in the fighting. The Japanese and Croatians also withdrew around this time.

To replace the Austrians, a contingent of Nepalese troops, some 130 strong, were redeployed from Lebanon where they had formed part of the United Nations Interim Force in Lebanon; the Fijians also deployed 170 more troops. Ireland also deployed 115 peacekeepers to serve with UNDOF in September 2013, based at Camp Faouar. The Irish peacekeepers were attacked by Syrian rebels on 29 November 2013. The Irish convoy came under small arms fire and was hit with an explosion before the rebels retreated.

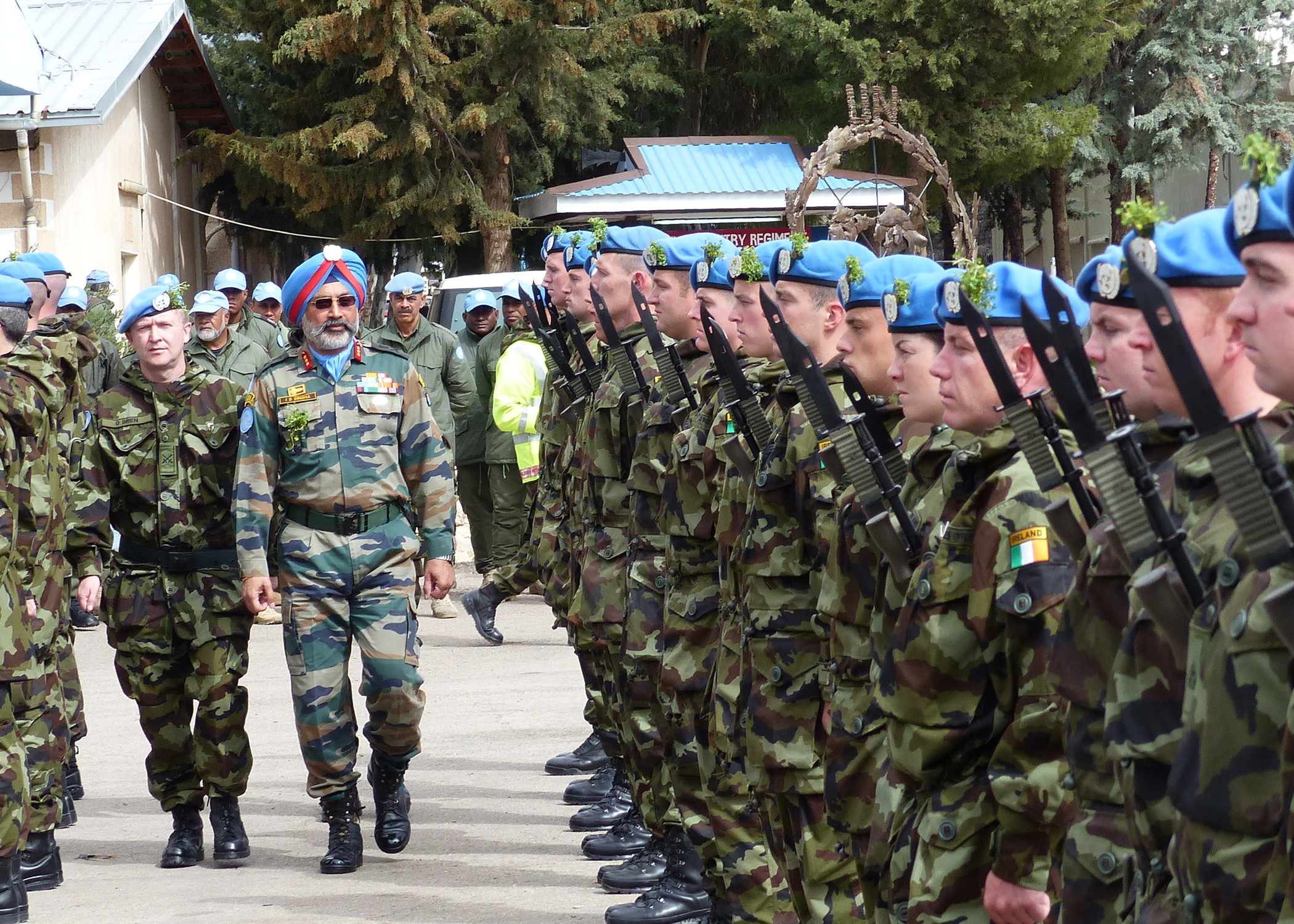
Lieutenant General Iqbal Singh Singha inspecting the Irish and Fijian contingents in March 2014

In August 2014, Syrian rebels captured Fijian peacekeepers and surrounded Filipinos manning two separate UN posts. A group of 72 Filipino troops were also surrounded, but later managed to escape after engaging about 100 Islamist militants surrounding them in a seven-hour firefight. Irish UNDOF troops helped in the rescue. The 45 captured Fijian peacekeepers were released by al-Nusra Front rebels on 11 September 2014.

On 13 October 2017, Major General Francis Vib-Sanziri of Ghana was appointed as Head of Mission and Force Commander of UNDOF. He succeeded Major General Jai Shanker Menon of India, whose assignment ended on 30 September 2017.

UNDOF's budget is approved on an annual basis by the UN General Assembly. Its budget for July 2017 – June 2018 was US$57,653,700, representing less than 1% of the UN peacekeeping budget. As of 2017, there have been 58 fatalities, including one civilian staff, since 1974.

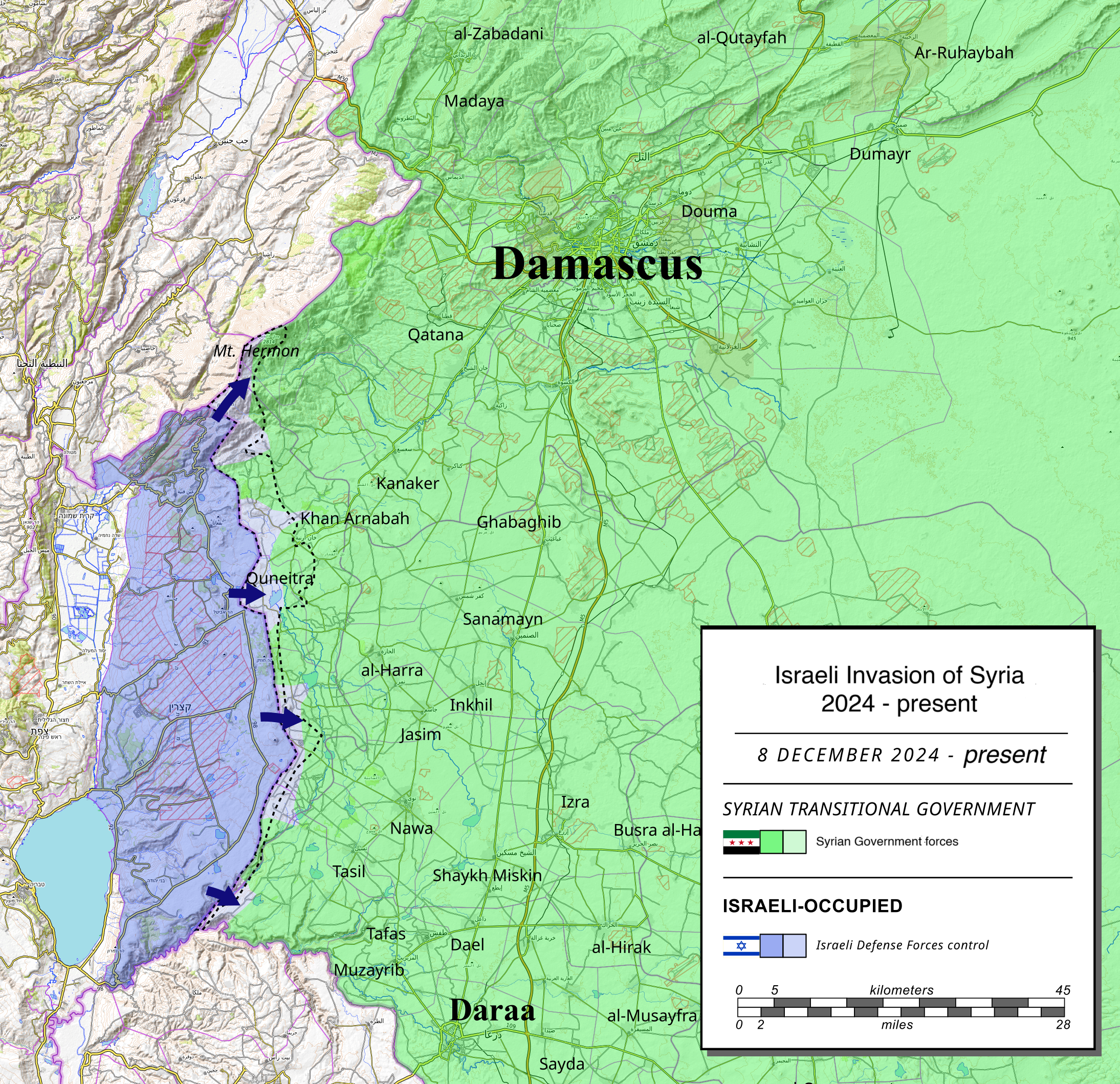
Israeli-occupied Golan Heights and Israeli invasion of Syria in December 2024

As of March 2021, UNDOF consisted of 1,096 troops provided by Nepal, India, Uruguay, Fiji, Ireland, Ghana, the Czech Republic and Bhutan. The troops are assisted by military observers from UNTSO's Observer Group Golan, along with international and local civilian staff.

On 7 December 2024 armed individuals penetrated UNDOF position 10A near Hader, exchanged fire with peacekeepers and looted equipment, which was partially recovered afterwards.

After the fall of the Assad regime on 8 December 2024, Israel launched an invasion into the Quneitra Governorate, advancing into the UNDOF buffer zone. As of January 2025, UNDOF forces remain at their pre-invasion positions and call for a "return to full mandate implementation", but acknowledge the IDF as the "de facto authorities". UNDOF has reported the IDF searches, arrests, and roadblocks to their activities during the occupation. In February 2025, Israeli Defense Minister Israel Katz said that Israeli forces would remain in southern Syria "for an indefinite period of time to protect our communities and thwart any threat."

== Mandate and tasks ==
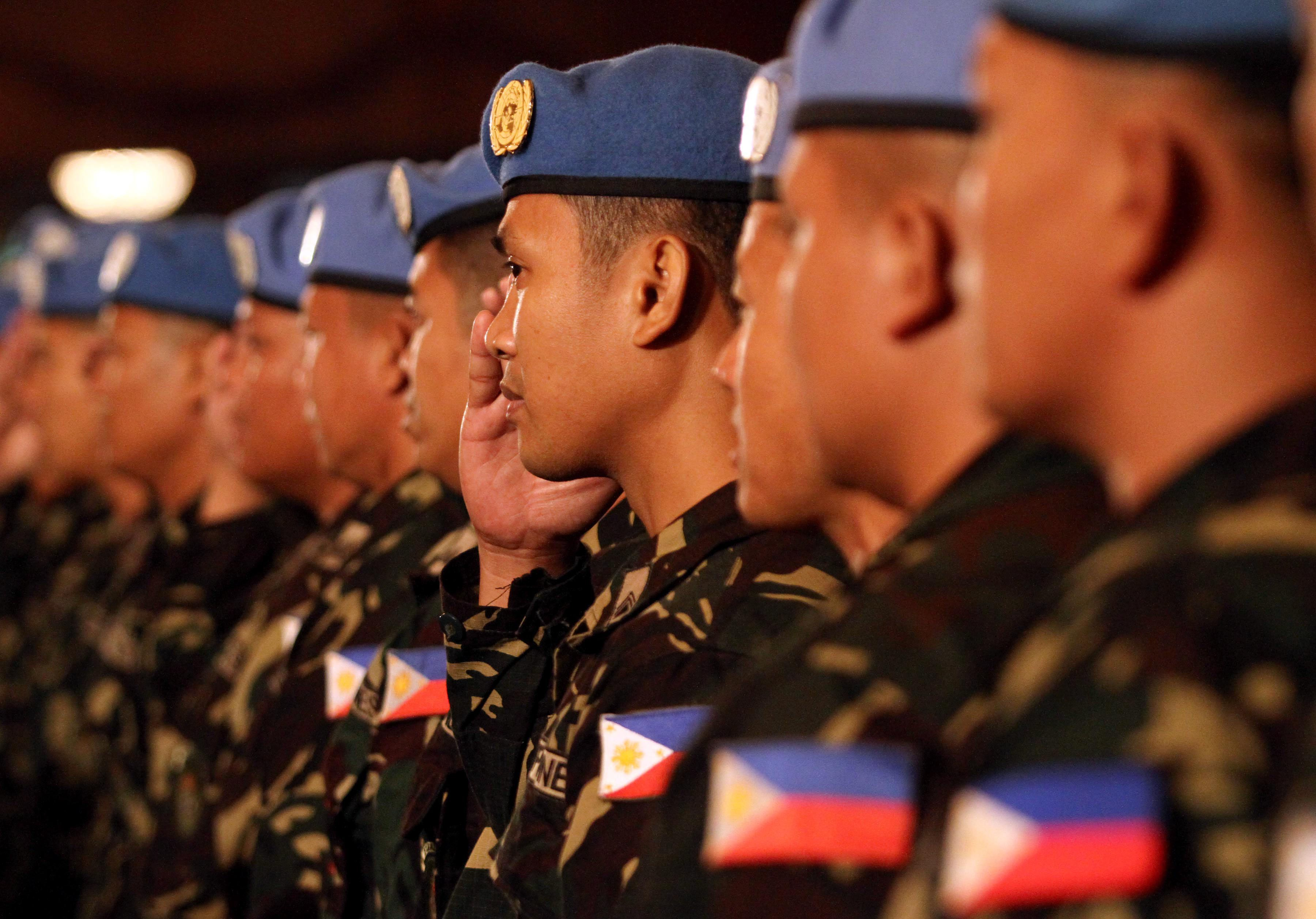
Philippine contingent to the Golan Heights

Upon establishment, UNDOF's mandate was as follows:

- Maintain the ceasefire between Israel and Syria;
- Supervise the disengagement of Israeli and Syrian forces; and
- Supervise the areas of separation and limitation, as provided in the May 1974 Agreement on Disengagement.

On 27 June 2024 the Security Council extended the mandate of the United Nations Disengagement Observer Force (UNDOF) in the Golan for six months until 31 December 2024.

In recommending the current extension of the mandate, UN Secretary-General Ban Ki-moon observed that despite the present calm in the Israeli-Syrian ceasefire line, the situation in the Middle East was likely to remain tense. Until a comprehensive settlement was reached, the Secretary-General considered the continued presence of UNDOF in the area to be essential.

Since its inception, UNDOF's tasks have included:

- Overall supervision of the buffer zone
- Monitoring of Syrian and Israeli military presence in the area (from permanent observation posts and by patrols day and night, on foot and motorized)
- Intervention in cases of entry to the separation area by military personnel from either side, or attempted operations
- Bi-weekly inspections of 500 Israeli and Syrian military locations in the areas of limitation on each side to ensure agreed limits of equipment and forces are being followed
- Assistance to the International Committee of the Red Cross (ICRC) in the passing of mail and people through the area, and in the provision of medical services
- Identifying and marking of minefields
- Promotion of minefield awareness amongst civilians and support of the United Nations Children's Fund activities in this area
- Work to protect the environment and to minimize the impact of UNDOF on the area.

== Operations ==
The UNDOF Zone of operation straddles the Purple Line, separating the Israeli-occupied portion of the Golan Heights and the rest of Syria, where the west line is known as "Alpha", and the east line as "Bravo". The zone also borders the Lebanon Blue Line to the north and forms a border of less than 1 km with Jordan to the south.

Operationally, the Alpha Line was drawn in the west, not to be crossed by Israeli Forces, and the Bravo Line in the east, not to be crossed by Syrian Forces. Between these lines lies the Area of Separation (AOS) which is a buffer zone. Extending 25 km to either side is the Area of Limitation (AOL) where UNDOF, and Observer Group Golan (OGG) observers under its command, supervise the number of Syrian and Israeli troops and weapons. Inside the AOS, UNDOF operates with checkpoints and patrols. Previously two line-battalions operated in this area; one, in the northern part (previously AUSBATT) from the Mount Hermon massif to the region of Quneitra, and another (previously POLBATT) in the south down to the Jordanian border. As of 2020, Nepalese troops, including a mechanized company have taken over northern and central sectors.

According to former Chief of Staff, Colonel Andreas Stupka, "between Israel and Syria there is no official border crossing, but for the UN one crossing point exists near Quneitra, called "The A-Gate". Although the line battalions and HQ operate on the Syrian side", at times some of the battalion headquarters, as well as a checkpoint position, and HQ LOGBATT have been located on the Israeli side, around Camp Ziouani. Most of the Austrians that were deployed in support of UNDOF, "served on the Syrian side and only a few who were members of the military police fulfilled their duties at the crossing point". Since 2020, the Fijian Battalion has been based at Camp Ziouani, while an Irish company forms the force commander's reserve, based at Camp Faouar on the Syrian side. A Uruguayan mechanized company has been assigned to the southern sector.

UNDOF is deployed within and close to the zone with two base camps, 44 permanently staffed positions and 11 observation posts. The operation headquarters are located at Camp Faouar and an office is maintained at Damascus. The Uruguayan battalion is deployed in the south with its base camp in Camp Ziouani, in the same area that the Polish battalion previously occupied. The Indian and Japanese logistic units perform second-line general transport tasks, rotation transport, control and management of goods received by the Force, and maintenance of heavy equipment. According to UNDOF's website, "first-line logistic support is internal to the contingents and includes transport of supplies to the positions".

== Equipment ==
- 28 x RG-31 Nyala, refurbished and taken over from UNIFIL.
- 4 x M113 armored personnel carriers, shipped to UNDOF in 1996 from UNAMIR.
- 20 x Sisu Pasi
- 3 x RG-32

== Commanders of the force ==
Start date	End date	Name	Country	Source
June 1974	December 1974	General de brigada Gonzalo Brinceno	Peru	
December 1974	May 1979	Generalmajor Hannes Philipp	Austria	
May 1979	February 1981	Generalmajor Günther Greindl	Austria	
March 1981	April 1982	Kenraalimajuri Erkki Kaira	Finland	
June 1982	May 1985	Generalmajor Carl-Gustaf Ståhl	Sweden	
June 1985	31 May 1986	Kenraalimajuri Gustav Hägglund	Finland	
1 June 1986	30 June 1986	W. A. D. Yuill (acting)	Canada	
1 July 1986	September 1988	Generalmajor Gustaf Welin	Sweden	
September 1988	September 1991	Generalmajor Adolf Radauer	Austria	
September 1991	November 1994	Generał dywizji Roman Misztal	Poland	
January 1995	May 1997	Generaal-majoor J.C. Kosters	Netherlands	
May 1997	August 1998	Maor-ghinearál David Stapleton	Ireland	
October 1998	July 2000	Major-general H. Cameron Ross	Canada	
August 2000	August 2003	Generalmajor Bo Wranker	Sweden	
August 2003	January 2004	Generał dywizji Franciszek Gągor	Poland	
January 2004	January 2007	Lieutenant general Bala Nanda Sharma	Nepal	
January 2007	March 2010	Generalmajor Wolfgang Jilke	Austria	
March 2010	August 2012	Major general Natalio Ecarma III	Philippines	
August 2012	January 2015	Lieutenant general Iqbal Singh Singha	India	
January 2015	2016	Purna Chandra Thapa	Nepal	
2016	30 September 2017	Jai Shanker Menon	India	
2017	19 April 2019	Francis Sanziri	Ghana	
June 2019	October 2019	Shivaram Kharel (acting)	Nepal	
10 July 2020	September 2022	Ishwar Hamal	Nepal	
September 2022	December 2024	Nirmal Kumar Thapa	Nepal	
December 2024	Present	Anita Asmah	Ghana	

== UNDOF Zone ==
The UNDOF Zone is about 80 km long, and between 0.5 and 10 km wide, forming an area of 235 km^{2}. The zone straddles the Purple Line, separating the Israeli-occupied portion of the Golan Heights and the rest of Syria, where the west line is known as "Alpha", and the east line as "Bravo". The zone also borders the Lebanon Blue Line to the north and forms a border of less than 1 km with Jordan to the south.

== See also ==
- Demilitarized zone
- Borders of Israel
- Mixed Armistice Commissions
- United Nations Interim Force in Lebanon
- List of territories governed by the United Nations
