= UNDOF Zone =

- Demilitarized zone
- United Nations Disengagement Observer Force Zone
- Flag Coat of arms

- UNDOF deployment in 2014

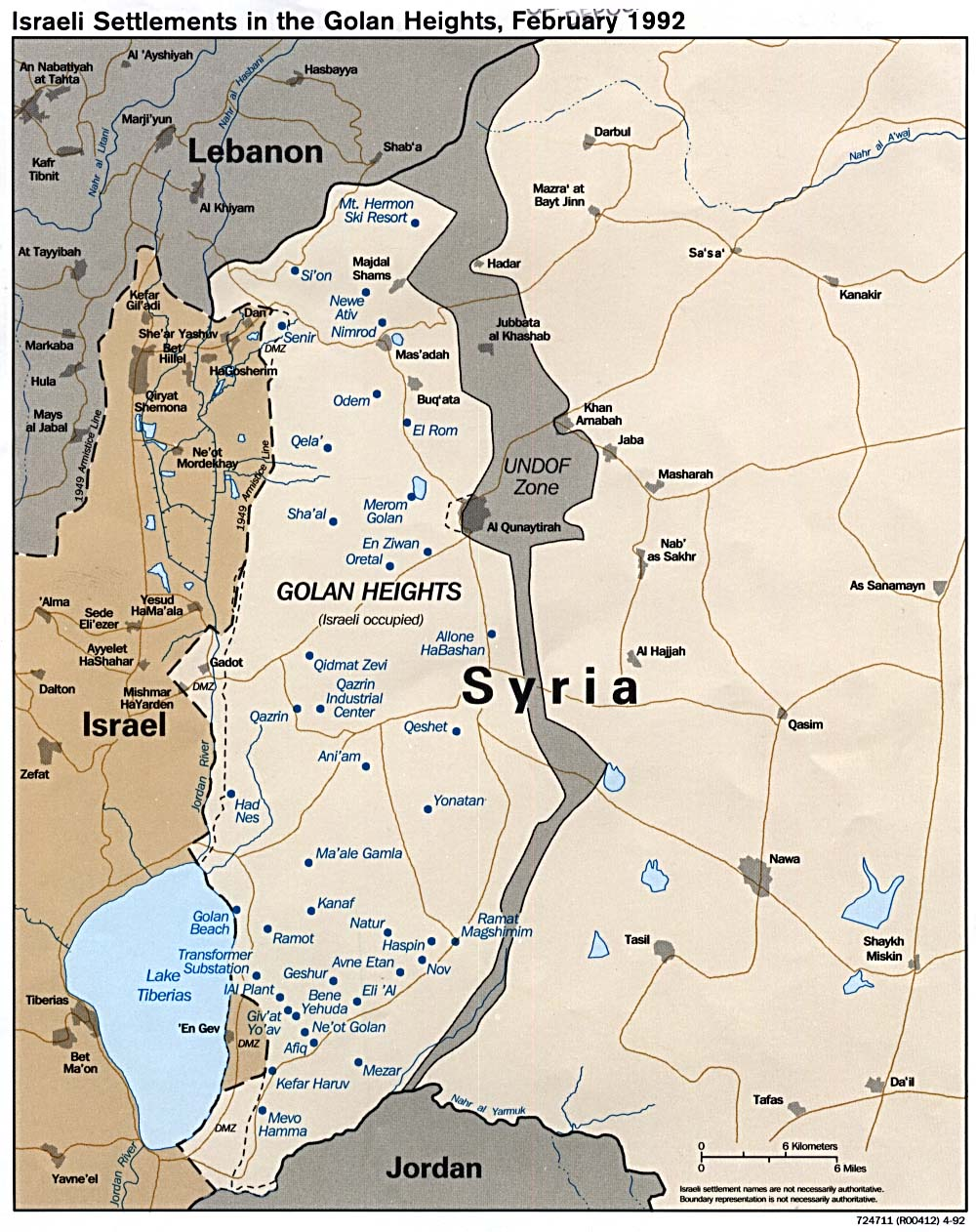
- UNDOF zone in 1992.
- United Nations Security Council Resolution 350: 31 May 1974
- Headquarters: Camp Faouar, Syria

Government
  - Type: United Nations administration
  - UNDOF Commander: Anita Asmah

Area
  - Total: 235 km^{2} (91 sq mi)

The United Nations Disengagement Observer Force (UNDOF) Zone is a United Nations administered demilitarized zone separating Syria from the Israeli occupied Golan Heights. It was established in 1973 by the Agreement on Disengagement between Israel and Syria in the aftermath of the Yom Kippur War. The zone is about 80 km long, and between 0.5 and 10 km wide, forming an area of 235 km^{2}. The zone straddles the Purple Line, separating the Israeli-occupied portion of the Golan Heights and the rest of Syria, where the west line is known as "Alpha", and the east line as "Bravo". The zone also borders the Lebanon Blue Line to the north and forms a border around 200 m with Jordan to the south. Parts of the zone were occupied by Israeli Defense Forces after the collapse of the Syrian Ba'athist regime in December 2024.

== Geography ==
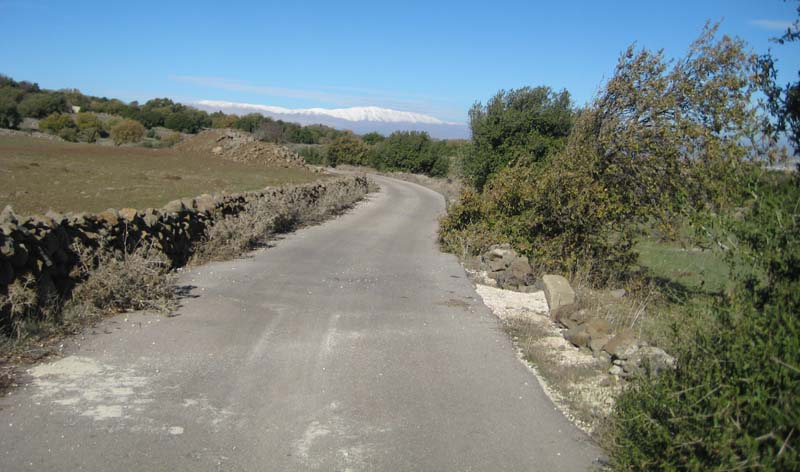
Landscape with Mount Hermon on the horizon

The zone is about 80 km long, and between 0.2 and 10 km wide, forming an area of 235 km^{2} (91 square miles). The terrain is hilly on the highlands within the Anti-Lebanon mountain range system. The highest point in the zone is at Mount Hermon (2814 m) on the Lebanese border. The lowest point is at the Yarmuk River, which sits at 200 m below sea-level at its confluence with the Jordan River. By the end of 2024 the northern half of this zone has been given the nickname 'The Herman Strip' by some groups.

== Populated places ==
There are several towns and villages within and bordering the zone, including the ruins of Quneitra.

Populated places include:

Name	Population
Asbah	380
Bariqa	371
Beer Ajam	353
Hader (part)	4,819
Jubata al-Khashab	3,493
Madinat al-Salam	4,500
Al-Rafid	2,263
Tirinja	

== Civilian activities ==
Since 1967, brides have been allowed to cross the Golan border, but they do so in the knowledge that the journey is a one-way trip; the weddings are facilitated by the ICRC. Since 1988, Israel has allowed Druze pilgrims to cross the ceasefire line at the Quneitra Crossing to visit the shrine of Abel in Syria. In the Al Qunaytirah area, a company monitors the main roads leading into the AOS. Several times during the year Israel and Syria permit crossings of Arab citizens under the supervision of the ICRC at an unofficial gate in the area. These people are pilgrims and students of the University of Damascus living in the Golan Heights or Israel. In 2005, Syria began allowing a few trucks of Druze-grown Golan apples, driven by Kenyan nationals, to cross into their territory on an annual basis, although the trade was interrupted throughout 2011–2012.

The defunct Trans-Arabian oil Pipeline (Tapline) crosses through the southern half of the zone. Israel had permitted the pipeline's operation through the Golan Heights to continue after the territory came under Israeli occupation as a result of the Six-Day War in 1967, with repairs being facilitated by UNTSO observers. However, the section of the line beyond Jordan had ceased operation in 1976 due to transit fees disputes between Saudi Arabia and Lebanon and Syria, the emergence of oil supertankers, and pipeline breakdowns.

Land mines continue to pose a significant danger to UNDOF and the civilian population. The fact that the explosives have begun to deteriorate worsens the threat. Mine clearance has been conducted by the Austrian and Polish battalions, directed from the UNDOF headquarters.

Parts of the zone, including the summit of Mount Hermon, were occupied by Israeli Defense Forces after the collapse of the Syrian Ba'athist regime in December 2024.

== See also ==
- United Nations Disengagement Observer Force
- Agreement on Disengagement between Israel and Syria
- Demilitarized zone
- List of territories governed by the United Nations
