= Eduard Gruner =

Carl Eduard Gruner
- Born: 2 June 1905; Basel, Switzerland
- Died: 21 May 1984 (aged 78); Basel, Switzerland
- Occupation: Engineer
- Parent: Heinrich Eduard Gruner

Carl Eduard Gruner (in English, often referred to as Charles Edward Gruner) was a Basel-born Swiss engineer, manager of the Swissboring Company and later on a partner at the "Gruner Brothers" ("Gebr. Gruner", today "Gruner Group") engineering company. He made considerable contributions to many projects in Europe. the Middle East, Central Asia and South America, most particularly the construction of the Trans-Iranian Railway, in which he participated as a Sector Engineer.

During the Second World War (1939–1941 and 1943–1946) Gruner was in charge of several military construction works in his homeland. Between 1941 and 1943 he was in charge of railways and power plants construction in Norway. From 1946 he was mainly involved in projects outside Europe. In 1947 he experienced the death of his father, Heinrich Gruner, who had established an engineering company of his own in 1862. In 1948, Gruner became partner in his late father's company. As the responsible for the Public Works Department, Gruner directed the construction of power plants, railways and irrigation systems in India, Pakistan, Syria, Sudan and Uruguay.

In 1976 he was asked by a subcommittee of the United Nations General Assembly to survey the damage caused to the Syrian town of Quneitra during the Israel-Syrian wars in 1967 and in 1973. Gruner worked with team of Swiss engineers and military experts, who lived in the town for four months and examined every recognizable structure. They concluded that some damage had been caused by the warfare, however most of the damage had been the result of deliberate destruction by heavy machinery. Gruner's report served as a confirmation of the Syrian allegation that Israel deliberately destroyed the town after the 1973 War, before handing it back to Syrian civil control according to the ceasefire agreements. The UN General Assembly adopted his report.
