= Ministry of Justice (Syria) =

Government ministry of Syria

- وِزَارَةُ الْعَدْلِ

Agency overview
- Formed: August 19, 1943; 82 years ago
- Jurisdiction: Government of Syria
- Headquarters: Damascus
- Minister responsible: Mazhar al-Wais
- Website: moj.gov.sy

The Ministry of Justice (Arabic: وِزَارَةُ الْعَدْلِ, romanized: Wizārat al-ʿAdl) is the government ministry responsible for judicial affairs in Syria.

== History ==
On 17 May 2025, President Ahmed al-Sharaa issued Presidential Decree No. 20 establishing the National Commission for Transitional Justice, alongside the National Commission for the Missing.

== List of ministers of justice ==
=== French Mandate (1920–1930) ===
Name (Birth–Death)	Term of office			Notes
Name (Birth–Death)	Took office	Left office	Time in office	Notes
Jalal al-Zahdi	March 1920	September 1920		
Badih Mu'ayyad al-Azm	September 1920	June 1922		
Ata Bey al-Ayyubi (1877–1951)	June 1922	May 1926		
Yusuf al-Hakim	May 1926	February 1928		
Zaki al-Khatib	February 1928	November 1931		

=== First Syrian Republic (1930–1950) ===
Name (Birth–Death)	Term of office			Notes
Name (Birth–Death)	Took office	Left office	Time in office	Notes
Zaki al-Khatib	February 1928	November 1931		
Mazhar Raslan	June 1932	June 1933		Listed as Minister of Justice and Education
Suleiman Jokhadar	June 1933	May 1934		
Ata Bey al-Ayyubi (1877–1951)	May 1934	February 1936		
Said al-Ghazzi (1893–1967)	February 1936	December 1936		
Abd al-Rahman al-Kayyali	21 December 1936	18 February 1939	2 years, 59 days	
Nasib al-Bakri (1888–1966)	24 February 1939	5 April 1939	40 days	
Khalid al-Azm (1903–1965)	5 April 1939	8 July 1939	94 days	
Khalil Raf'a	8 July 1939	3 April 1941	1 year, 269 days	
Safwat Ibrahim	3 April 1941	September 1941		
Zaki al-Khatib	September 1941	17 April 1942		
Ragheb Kikhia	17 April 1942	25 March 1943	342 days	
Faydi al-Atasi	25 March 1943	19 August 1943	147 days	Listed as Minister of Social Affairs, Justice and Education
Abd al-Rahman al-Kayyali	19 August 1943	5 April 1945	1 year, 229 days	
Said al-Ghazzi (1893–1967)	5 April 1945	26 August 1945	143 days	
Sabri al-Asali (1903–1976)	26 August 1945	27 April 1946	244 days	
Khalid al-Azm (1903–1965)	27 April 1946	28 December 1946	245 days	
Na'im Antaki	28 December 1946	16 April 1947	109 days	Resigned
Adnan al-Atasi	16 April 1947	6 October 1947	173 days	
Ahmad al-Rifai	6 October 1947	23 August 1948	322 days	
Said al-Ghazzi (1893–1967)	23 August 1948	12 December 1948	111 days	
Ahmad al-Rifai	12 December 1948	17 April 1949	126 days	
As'ad Kurani	17 April 1949	17 August 1949	122 days	
Sami Kabbara	17 August 1949	28 December 1949	133 days	
Faydi al-Atasi	28 December 1949	4 June 1950	158 days	
Zaki al-Khatib	4 June 1950	9 August 1951	1 year, 66 days	

=== Second Syrian Republic (1950–1958, 1961–1963) ===
Name (Birth–Death)	Term of office			Notes
Name (Birth–Death)	Took office	Left office	Time in office	Notes
Zaki al-Khatib	4 June 1950	9 August 1951	1 year, 66 days	
Abdul Aziz Hassan	9 August 1951	13 November 1951	96 days	
Hamid Naji	13 November 1951	9 June 1952	209 days	
Munir Ghanim	9 June 1952	19 July 1953	1 year, 40 days	
Asad Muhsin	19 July 1953	1 March 1954	225 days	
Izzat al-Saqqal	1 March 1954	19 June 1954	110 days	
As'ad Kurani	19 June 1954	3 November 1954	137 days	
Ali Bozo	3 November 1954	13 February 1955	102 days	
Maamun al-Kuzbari (1914–1998)	1955	1955		
Munir al-Ajlani	1955	1956		

=== United Arab Republic (1958–1961) ===
Name (Birth–Death)	Term of office			Notes
Name (Birth–Death)	Took office	Left office	Time in office	Notes
Akram al-Hawrani (1911–1996)	1958	1960		

=== Ba'athist Syria (1963–2024) ===
Name (Birth–Death)	Term of office			Notes
Name (Birth–Death)	Took office	Left office	Time in office	Notes
Fathallah Allush	1966	1967		
Ihsan Subaynati	1968	1968		
Ibrahim Hamzawi	1969	1970		
Adib al-Nahawi	1972	1980		
Khalid Malki	1980	1985		
Sha'ban Shahin	1986	1987		
Khalid al-Ansari	1987	1993		
Abdullah Tulba	1993	1994		
Hussein Hassun	1994	2000		
Muhammad Nabil al-Khatib	2000	10 September 2003		
Nizar Al Isa	18 September 2003	10 April 2004	205 days	
Muhammad Al Ghafri	10 April 2004	23 April 2009	5 years, 13 days	
Ahmad Younes	23 April 2009	29 March 2011	1 year, 340 days	
Tayseer Qala Awwad	14 April 2011	16 August 2012	1 year, 124 days	
Najm Hamad Al Ahmad	16 August 2012	29 March 2017	4 years, 225 days	
Hisham Al Shaar	29 March 2017	30 August 2020	3 years, 154 days	
Ahmad al-Sayyed (born 1965)	30 August 2020	8 December 2024	4 years, 100 days	

=== Syrian Arab Republic (2024–present) ===
Name (Birth–Death)	Term of office			Notes
Name (Birth–Death)	Took office	Left office	Time in office	Notes
Ahmad al-Sayyed (born 1965)	8 December 2024	10 December 2024	2 days	
Shadi al-Waisi (born 1985)	10 December 2024	29 March 2025	109 days	
Mazhar al-Wais (born 1980)	29 March 2025	Incumbent	1 year, 135 days	

== See also ==
- Cabinet of Syria
- National Commission for Transitional Justice
- Justice ministry
- Politics of Syria
