= Najm Hamad Al Ahmad =

Syrian politician

- نجم حمد الأحمد

Minister of Justice
- In office 16 August 2012 – 29 March 2017
- President: Bashar al-Assad
- Prime Minister: Wael Al Halaqi; Imad Khamis
- Preceded by: Tayseer Qala Awwad
- Succeeded by: Hisham Al Shaar

Personal details
- Born: 1969 (age 56–57) Aleppo
- Party: Ba'ath Party
- Education: University of Damascus; Ain Shams University

Najm Hamad Al Ahmad (Arabic: نجم حمد الأحمد) (born 1969) is a Syrian jurist and justice minister from 2012 until 2017.

== Early life and education ==
Ahmad was born in Aleppo in 1969. He hails from an Alawi family. He holds a bachelor's degree in law, which he received in 1991. He also obtained degrees in general law, administrative law and administrative sciences from the University of Damascus and Ain Shams University in Egypt. He also received a PhD in law from Ain Shams University.

== Career ==
Ahmad served as the chairman of the judicial reform committee formed on 17 May 2011. He also served as deputy justice minister. On 16 August 2012, Ahmad was appointed justice minister by the Syrian president Bashar al-Assad to the cabinet headed by Wael Al Halaqi. In July 2016 Ahmad was also named as the justice minister in the cabinet led by Imad Khamis. On 29 March 2017 Hisham Al Shaar replaced Ahmad as justice minister in a cabinet reshuffle.

=== Sanctions ===
On 16 October 2012, the European Union put him along with other Syrian officials into the list of financial sanctions. The Treasury of the United Kingdom also put him among asset freeze targets the same day.

On 16 May 2013, the United States Treasury Department designated four senior Syrian officials, including Ahmad, for backing "the government of Bashar al-Assad in suppressing people or involvement in terrorism".
