= Tayseer Qala Awwad =

Syrian minister of justice

- تيسير قلا عواد

Minister of Justice
- In office 14 April 2011 – 23 June 2012
- President: Bashar al-Assad
- Prime Minister: Adel Safar
- Preceded by: Ahmad Hammoud Younes
- Succeeded by: Najm Hamad Al Ahmad

Personal details
- Born: 1943 (age 82–83) Damascus
- Children: five
- Education: University of Damascus

Judge Tayseer Qala Awwad (born 1943) is one of the former ministers of justice of Syria.

== Early life and education ==
Awwad was born in Damascus in 1943. He earned a law degree from the University of Damascus School of Law in 1974.

== Career ==
Awwad is a military judge, the former president of a military court, the president of the judicial inspection department at the ministry of justice, and a member of the Supreme Judicial Council. He was chairman of the commission of inquiry into crimes committed in the shield. Awwad was appointed justice minister to the cabinet headed by then prime minister Adel Safar in April 2011. Awwad's term ended on 16 August 2012, and Najm Hamad Al Ahmad succeeded him as justice minister. The reason for his removal was not stated.

== Sanctions ==
On 23 September 2011, the European Council sanctioned him, arguing that he was "associated with the Syrian regime, including by supporting its policies and practices of arbitrary arrest and detention."

== Personal life ==
Awwad is married with five children.
