= Jai Shanker Menon =

Indian military official

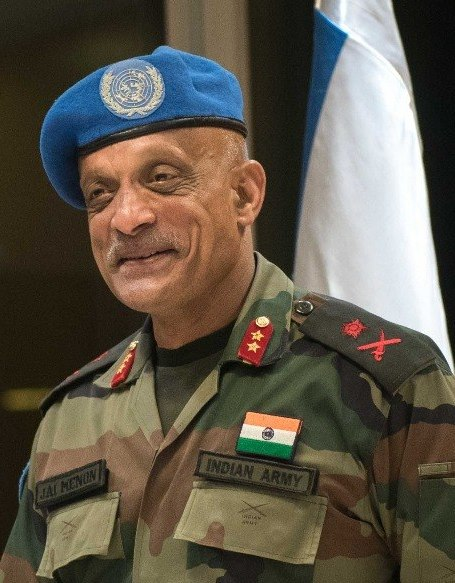
- Jai Shanker Menon, September 2017
- Born: 1959 (age 66–67)
- Military career
- Allegiance: India
- Branch: Indian Army
- Rank: Major General
- Commands: Head of Mission and Force Commander of the UNDOF (2016-2017)
- Known for: Military Observer, UNOMOZ (1993); Military Observer, UNIFIL (2007–2009)

Major General Jai Shanker Menon (born 1959) is an Indian military official, and was the Head of Mission and Force Commander of the United Nations Disengagement Observer Force from 7 February 2016 to 22 October 2017. Prior to this appointment in February 2016 by United Nations Secretary-General Ban Ki-moon, Major General Menon served as the Additional Director General of Equipment Management in the Indian Army.

He has held numerous officer and command positions with the Indian Army. His prior experience with the UN includes service as Military Observer with the United Nations Operation in Mozambique (1993) and with the United Nations Interim Force in Lebanon (2007 to 2009).
