= Quneitra =

Largely destroyed city in Syria; under Israeli control

Quneitra ٱلْقُنَيطْرَة
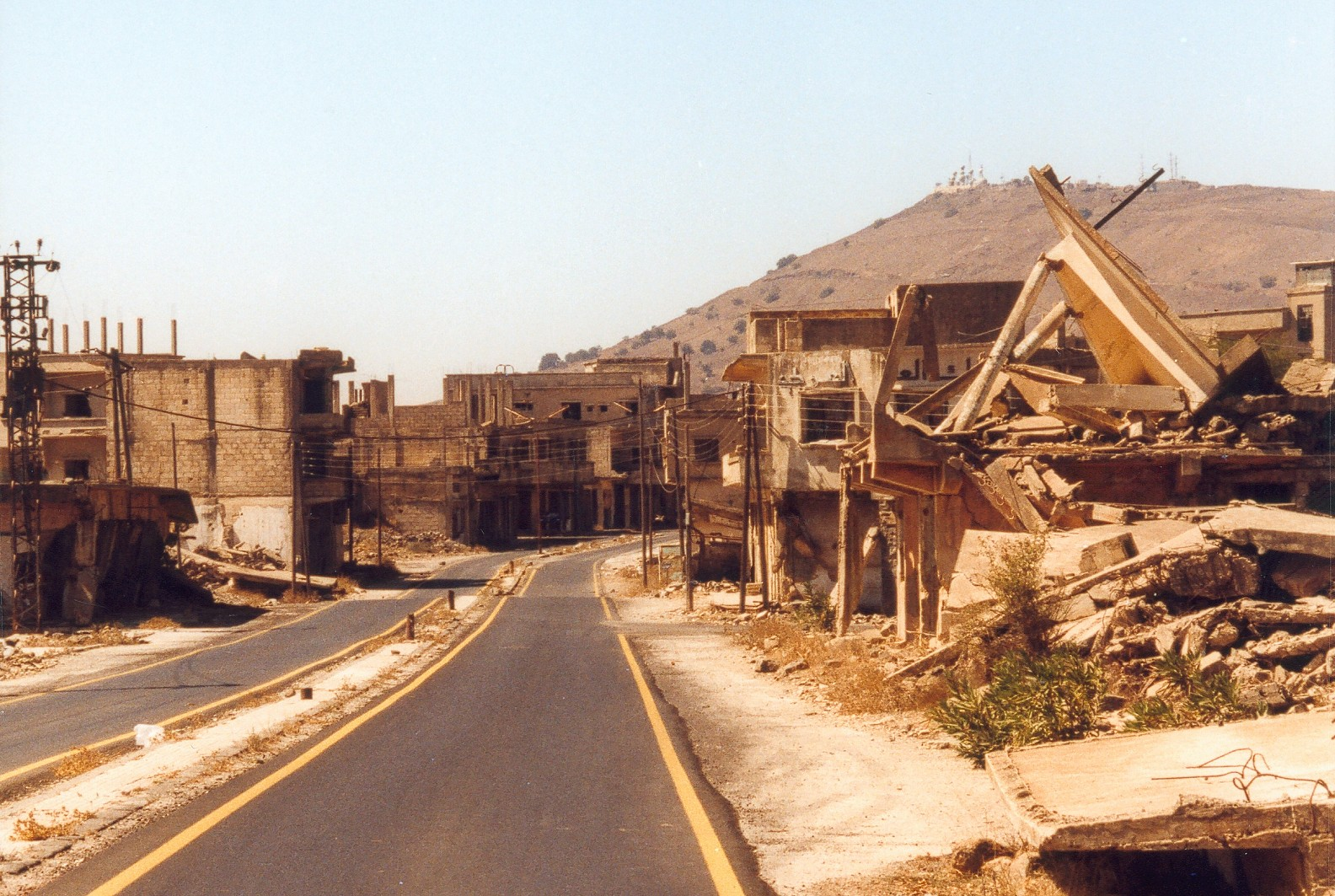
- View of the destroyed city

- Location of Quneitra within Syria Location of Quneitra within Golan Heights, Syria
- Coordinates: 33°07′N 35°49′E
- Country: Syria
- Governorate: Quneitra
- District: Quneitra
- Subdistrict: Quneitra
- Region: Golan Heights; UNDOF Zone
- Control: Israel (since 2024–present)
- Settled: around 1000 CE
- Resettled: 1873
- Destroyed: 1974
- Elevation: 1,010 m (3,313 ft)

Population (2004 census)
  - City: 153
  - Metro: 4,318
- Demonym(s): Arabic: قنيطراوي, Qunayṭrawi or Qunayṭirawi
- Time zone: UTC+3 (AST)
- Area code: 43

Quneitra (also Al Qunaytirah, Qunaitira, or Kuneitra; Arabic: ٱلْقُنَيطْرَة, romanized: al-Qunayṭrah or ٱلْقُنَيْطِرَة, al-Qunayṭirah, pronounced [æl qʊˈneɪ̯tˁ(ɨ)rɑ]) is the largely destroyed and abandoned capital of the Quneitra Governorate in south-western Syria. It is situated in a high valley in the Golan Heights at 1,010 metres (3,313 feet) above sea level. Since 1974, pursuant to United Nations Security Council Resolution 350 and the Agreement on Disengagement between Israel and Syria, the city is inside the UN-patrolled buffer zone.

Quneitra was founded in the Ottoman era as a way station on the caravan route to Damascus and subsequently became a garrison town of some 20,000 people. In 1946, it became part of the independent Syrian Republic within the Riff Dimashq Governorate and in 1964 became the capital of the split Quneitra Governorate. On 10 June 1967, the last day of the Six-Day War, Quneitra came under Israeli control. It was briefly recaptured by Syria during the 1973 Yom Kippur War, but Israel regained control in its subsequent counter-offensive. The city was almost completely destroyed by Israel before it withdrew in June 1974. Syria later refused to rebuild the city and actively discouraged resettlement in the area. Israel was heavily criticized by the United Nations for the city's destruction, while Israel has also criticized Syria for not rebuilding Quneitra.

In 2004, its population was estimated at 153 persons, with some 4,000 more living in the surrounding areas of the former city.

During the Syrian Civil War, Quneitra became a clash point between rebel forces and Syrian Arab Army. Between 2014 and July 2018, Quneitra was de facto controlled by the Southern Front, a Syrian rebel alliance. By the end of July 2018, Syrian Government forces regained control over the city, until the rebels retook it.

Quneitra came under the control of the Israel Defense Forces during the Israeli invasion of Syria following the fall of the Assad regime in December 2024.

== Etymology ==
Qantara is the Arabic word for arched bridge. Quneitra means small arch or bridge, and the name is derived from the small-arches bridge around which the town has been built.

== Political status ==
Quneitra is the capital of the Quneitra Governorate, a district of southwestern Syria that incorporates the whole of the Golan Heights. The city of Quneitra is within the portion of the Golan Heights controlled by Syria. Madinat al-Salam (Peace City), also known as New Quneitra, replaced Quneitra as the administrative centre of Quneitra Governorate.

== Geography and demographics ==
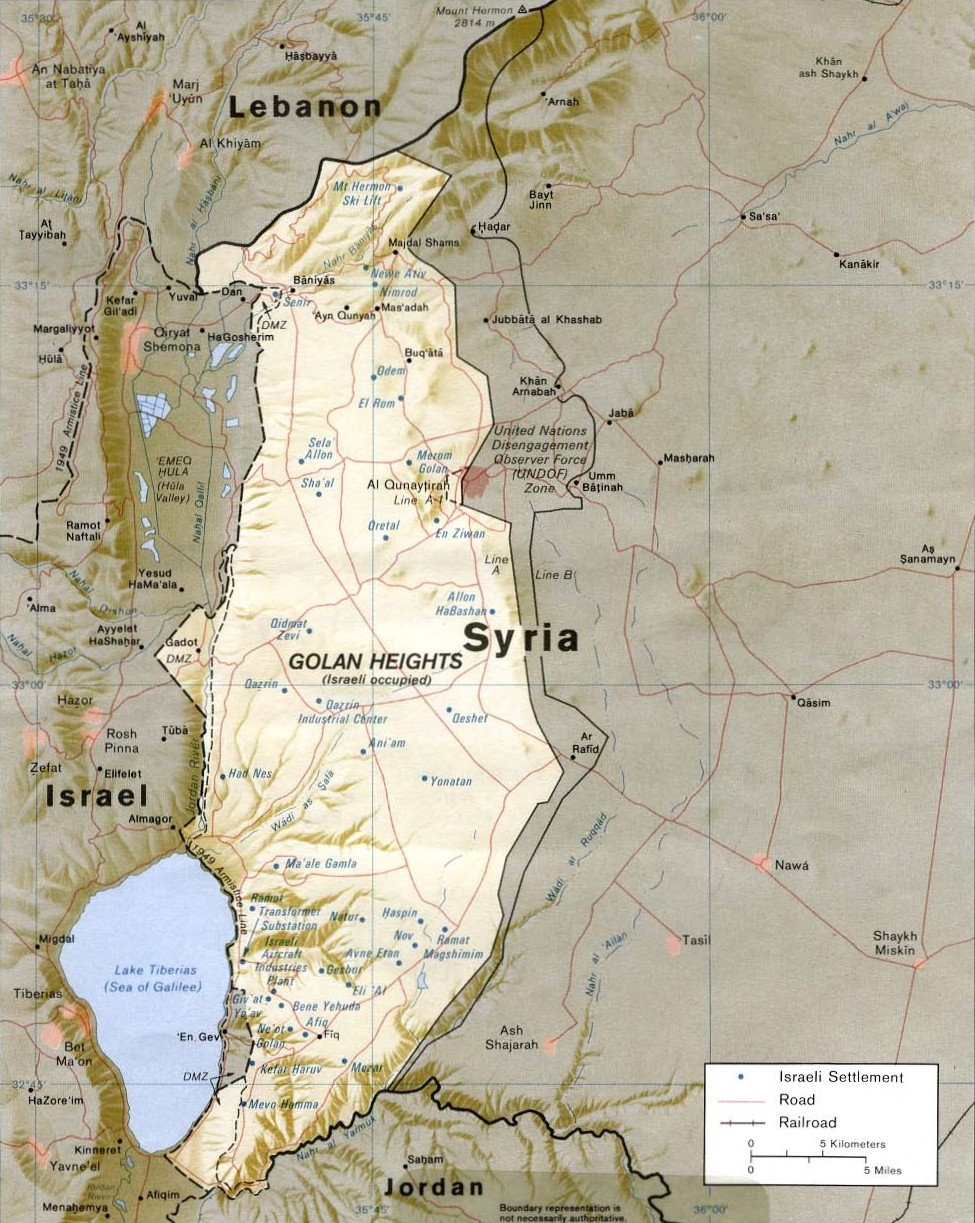
Map of the Golan Heights as of 1989, illustrating the location of Quneitra and the surrounding area.

Quneitra is situated in a high valley in the Golan Heights at an altitude of 942 metres (3,091 feet) above sea level. It is overshadowed to the west by the Israeli-held portion of the Golan Heights and the peak of Har Bental. The surrounding area is dominated by ancient volcanic lava flows interspersed by a number of dormant volcanic cones which rise some 150 to 200 metres (490 to 660 feet) above the surrounding plain. The volcanic hills of the region have played a key role as observation points and natural firing positions in the conflicts over the region, most notably in the Yom Kippur War. In more peaceful times, the fertile volcanic soil has supported agricultural activities such as wheat growing and pastoralism.

Writing during the inter-war period, the American traveler Harriet-Louise H. Patterson recorded that Quneitra was:

charmingly set in a grove of eucalyptus trees. Its chief claim to charm or the few moments of a traveller's time beyond passport formalities is the beautiful vista which it offers of Jordan as it flows down from Hermon through banks of tangled bush and flowering pink and white oleanders. Kuneitra is pleasant as a stopping-place for lunch. It is cool under the spreading trees, usually quiet and restful.

The city's position on an important trade route gave it a varied population for much of its history. By the start of the 20th century it was dominated by Muslim Circassians from the Caucasus, accompanied by Turkmen and Arabs. Its population grew to some 21,000 people, mostly Arabs, followed by Turkmen and Circassians, following Syrian independence from France in 1946. After its abandonment in 1967 and subsequent destruction, its population was dispersed to other parts of Syria. The city remains abandoned apart from a residual Syrian security presence. Due to frequent and large population movements within Syria and across borders caused by war, there are no reliable population estimates available post-2011. The impact of the crisis has led to massive displacements and a gradual deterioration of access to basic services. Quneitra has also been the destination for many internally displaced persons (IDPs) from neighbouring Daraa and Rif Dimashq governorates. In August 2013, many of the estimated 75,000 IDPs from Nawa and Al-Harra in Daraa Governorate reportedly fled to Quneitra.

=== Climate ===
Climate data for Quneitra, elevation 941 m (3,087 ft)
Month	Jan	Feb	Mar	Apr	May	Jun	Jul	Aug	Sep	Oct	Nov	Dec	Year
Mean daily maximum °C (°F)	9.3 (48.7)	10.8 (51.4)	13.8 (56.8)	18.0 (64.4)	23.2 (73.8)	27.2 (81.0)	28.1 (82.6)	29.1 (84.4)	26.7 (80.1)	24.2 (75.6)	17.8 (64.0)	12.1 (53.8)	20.0 (68.1)
Daily mean °C (°F)	5.6 (42.1)	6.5 (43.7)	9.0 (48.2)	12.8 (55.0)	17.2 (63.0)	21.2 (70.2)	21.8 (71.2)	22.7 (72.9)	20.6 (69.1)	18.1 (64.6)	12.8 (55.0)	8.1 (46.6)	14.7 (58.5)
Mean daily minimum °C (°F)	2.7 (36.9)	2.7 (36.9)	4.5 (40.1)	7.6 (45.7)	11.1 (52.0)	15.1 (59.2)	16.7 (62.1)	17.2 (63.0)	15.3 (59.5)	12.6 (54.7)	8.3 (46.9)	4.6 (40.3)	9.9 (49.8)
Average precipitation mm (inches)	191 (7.5)	141 (5.6)	110 (4.3)	33 (1.3)	31 (1.2)	1 (0.0)	0 (0)	0 (0)	1 (0.0)	19 (0.7)	87 (3.4)	180 (7.1)	794 (31.1)
Source: FAO (2024)

== History ==
=== Prehistory ===
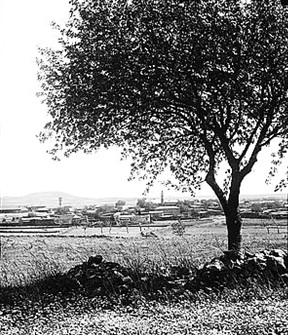
Skyline of Quneitra, 1929

The surrounding area has been inhabited for millennia. Palaeolithic hunter-gatherers are thought to have lived there, as evidenced by the discovery of Levallois and Mousterian flint tools in the vicinity.

=== Hellenistic to Byzantine periods ===
A settlement was established at least as early as the late Hellenistic period, and continued through the Roman and Byzantine times; it was known by the name "Sarisai". The settlement served as a stop on the road from Damascus to western Palestine. Saint Paul is said to have passed through the settlement on his way from Jerusalem to Damascus. The site of the Conversion of Paul was traditionally identified with the small village of Kokab, north-east of Quneitra, on the road to Damascus.

=== Late Ottoman period ===
For much of the 18th and 19th centuries Quneitra was abandoned. In 1868 a travel handbook reported that the site was a "ruined village of about 80 or 100 houses" and that a large caravanserai also stood in ruins. Semi-nomadic pastoral groups such as the Arab Al Fadl and Banu Nu'aym tribes and several Turkmen tribes grazed their flocks in Quneitra's rocky lands.

In 1873, a group of Circassians from Sivas in Anatolia settled in Quneitra. This initial group did not cultivate the area for a number of years. A second wave of Circassians, numbering about 2,000, arrived in the Golan in 1878 via Acre after fleeing Bulgaria due to the Russo-Turkish War. Along with Quneitra, they settled or built number of other villages in the vicinity. The Circassians began farming the area and each family was given title to 70 to 130 dunams of land by the government depending on the family's size. The Ottomans encouraged Circassian settlement in the Golan as a means to drive a wedge between the frequently rebellious Druze villages of Mount Hermon and those in Jabal Hauran. The Circassians of Quneitra engaged in sustained conflicts with the Druze and the Al Fadl through the remainder of the 19th century.

Modern Quneitra grew around the nucleus of the old Ottoman caravanserai, which had been built using the stones of a ruined ancient settlement. By the mid-1880s, Quneitra had become the main city and seat of government of the Golan. Gottlieb Schumacher wrote in 1888 that it "consists of 260 buildings, which are mostly well and carefully constructed of basalt stones, and contains, excluding the soldiers and officials, 1,300 inhabitants, principally Circassians." Circassians moved away from the Golan beginning after the Six-Day War and again after the fall of the Soviet Union.

During World War I, the Australian Mounted Division and 5th Cavalry Division defeated the Ottoman Turks at Quneitra on 29 September 1918, before they took Damascus (see also Battle of Megiddo (1918)).

=== Second World War ===
Quneitra saw several battles during the Syria-Lebanon Campaign of the Second World War, including the Battle of Damascus and Battle of Kissoué.

=== Arab-Israeli conflict ===
When the modern states of Syria and Israel gained their independence from France and Britain respectively after the Second World War, Quneitra gained a new strategic significance as a key road junction some 24 kilometres (15 mi) from the border. It became a prosperous market town and military garrison, with its population tripling to over 20,000 people, predominately Arabs.

==== Six-Day War ====
Quneitra was the Syrian headquarters for the Golan Heights. The Israeli capture of the city occurred in chaotic circumstances on 10 June 1967, the last day of the Six-Day War. Israeli forces advancing towards Quneitra from the north-west prompted Syrian troops to deploy north of the city, under heavy bombardment, to defend the road to Damascus. At 8:45 a.m., Syrian radio broadcast an announcement that the city had fallen, though it actually had not. Alarmed, the Syrian Army's redeployment turned into a chaotic retreat along the Damascus road.

According to 8th Brigade Commander Ibrahim Isma'il Khahya:

We received orders to block the roads leading to Quneitra. But then the fall of the city was announced and that caused many of my soldiers to leave the front and run back to Syria while the roads were still open. They piled onto vehicles. It further crushed our morale. I retreated before I ever saw an enemy soldier.

Although a correction was broadcast two hours later, the Israelis took advantage of the confusion to seize Quneitra. An armoured brigade under Colonel Albert Mandler entered Quneitra at 2:30 p.m. and found the city deserted and strewn with abandoned military equipment. One of the Israeli commanders later commented:

We arrived almost without hindrance to the gates of Quneitra ... All around us there were huge quantities of booty. Everything was in working order. Tanks with their engines still running, communication equipment still in operation, had been abandoned. We captured Quneitra without a fight.

Time magazine reported: "In an effort to pressure the United Nations into enforcing a ceasefire, Damascus Radio undercut its own army by broadcasting the fall of the city of El Quneitra three hours before it actually capitulated. That premature report of the surrender of their headquarters destroyed the morale of the Syrian troops left in the Golan area."

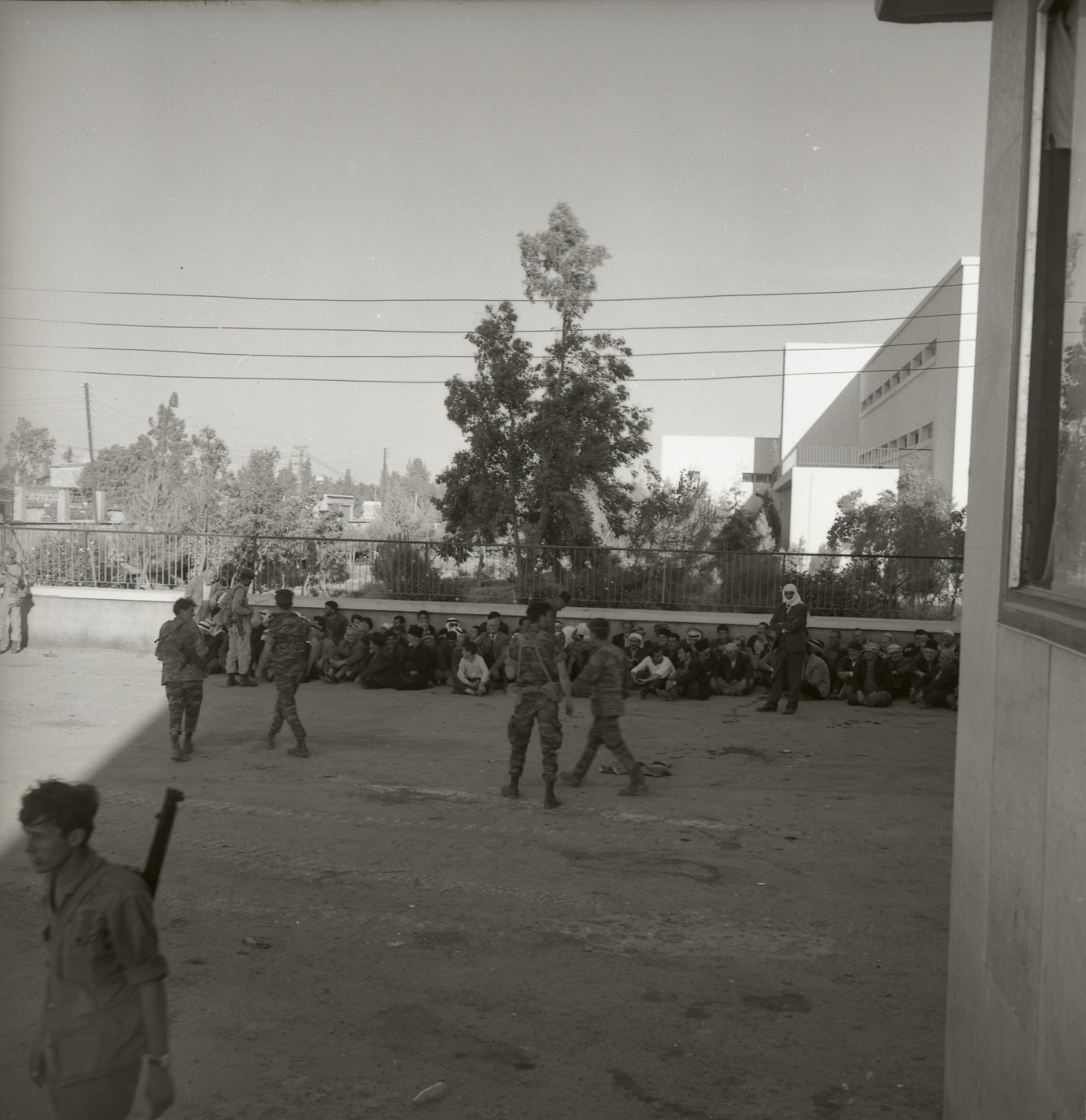
Israeli soldiers detaining residents of the Syrian village of Quneitra after its conquest in June 1967

A ceasefire was agreed later in the afternoon, leaving Quneitra under Israeli control. In June 1967, Time magazine wrote that: "The city of El Quneitra was a ghost town, its shops shuttered, its deserted streets patrolled by Israelis on house-to-house searches for caches of arms and ammunition. The hills echoed with explosions as Israeli sappers systematically destroyed the miniature Maginot line from which the Syrians had shelled kibbutzim across the Sea of Galilee."

The United Nations Special Representative, Nils-Göran Gussing, visited it in July and reported that "nearly every shop and every house seemed to have been broken into and looted" and that some buildings had been set on fire after they had been stripped. Although Israeli spokesmen told Gussing that Quneitra had actually been looted by the withdrawing Syrians, the UN representative viewed this as unlikely given the extremely short space of time between the erroneous radio announcement and the fall of the city a few hours later. He concluded that "responsibility for this extensive looting of the town of Quneitra lay to a great extent with the Israeli forces."

The civilian population, consisting mostly of Sunni Muslims, among whom there were a few thousand refugees from the 1948 War, as well as some Circassians and others, was all expelled by the Israeli army, with the exception of the Druze. Then, additional numbers of Circassian moved to the Caucasus after the fall of the Soviet Union.

==== Israeli occupation ====
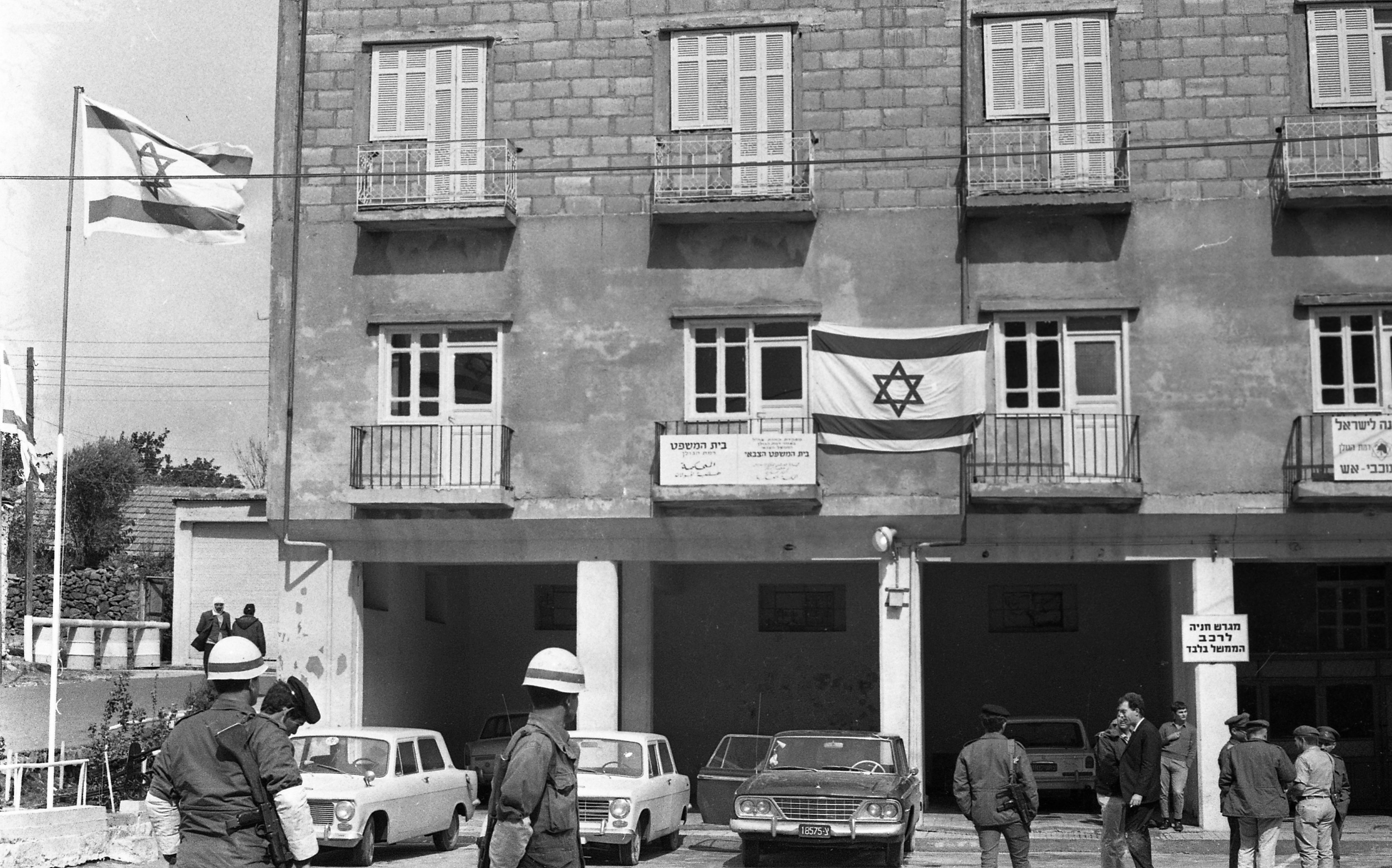
Military police headquarters in Quneitra under Israeli occupation, 1969.

The deserted city remained in Israeli hands for the next six years. However, Israel and Syria remained in a state of war throughout this period (and, indeed, to the present day). The town gained a fresh symbolic value; it was seen by the Syrians as "the badge of Syria's defeat, an emblem of hatred between Syria and Israel and a cross [Syrian President Hafez al-Assad] had to bear." Syria shelled the city several times during the early 1970s; in June 1970 a Syrian armored unit launched an attack, and in November 1972, Damascus radio announced that Syrian artillery had again shelled Quneitra.

==== Yom Kippur War ====
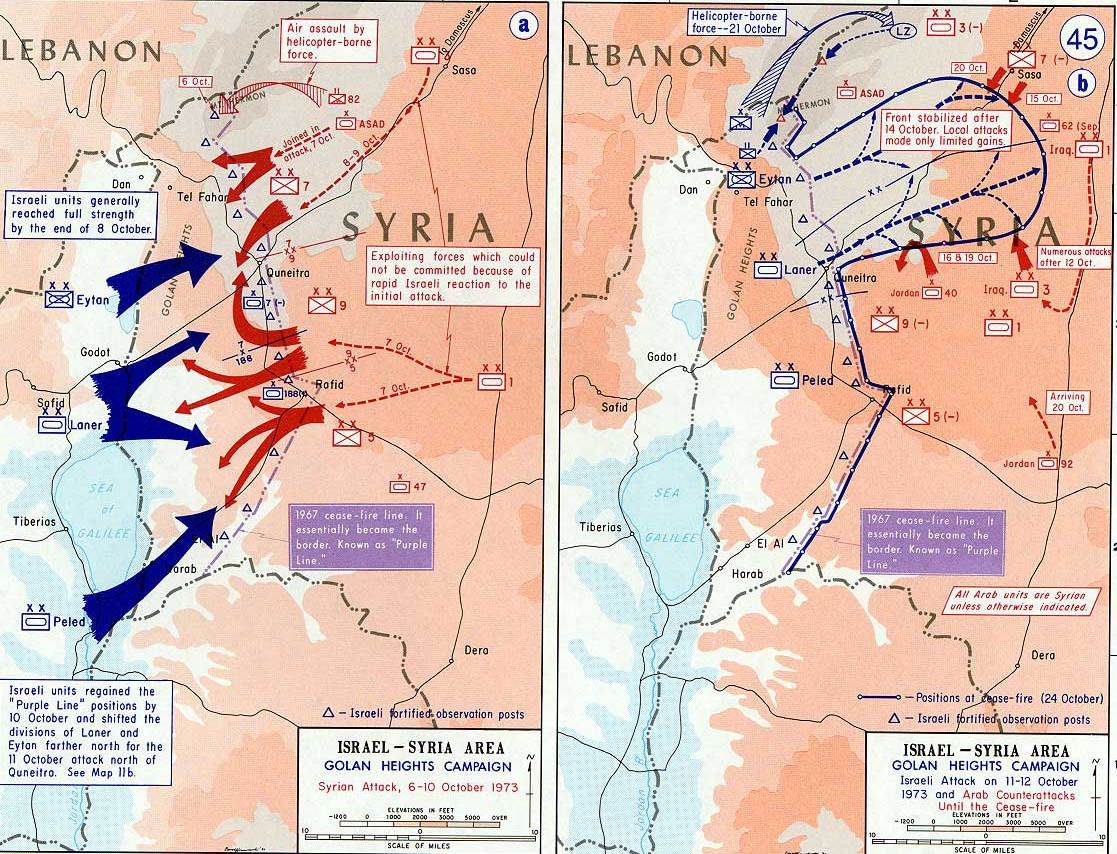
Golan Heights campaign during Yom Kippur War

During the first few days of the Yom Kippur War in 1973, Quneitra was briefly recaptured by the Syrian Army before it was repulsed in an Israeli counter-offensive. In the middle of October 1973 the Israeli counter-offensive started. The Syrians had massed nearly 1,000 tanks along a 100 km (60 mi) front. With a massive concentration of tanks, the Israelis lashed into the Syrian forces. The Syrians at first fell back, but then managed to counterattack and drive back into occupied territory. Quneitra changed hands several times. Finally, Israeli armored units, closely supported by Phantoms and Skyhawks performing close air support with napalm strikes against the forward Syrian units, halted the Syrian drive and turned the Syrian Army back.

==== Destruction of Quneitra and return to Syrian control ====
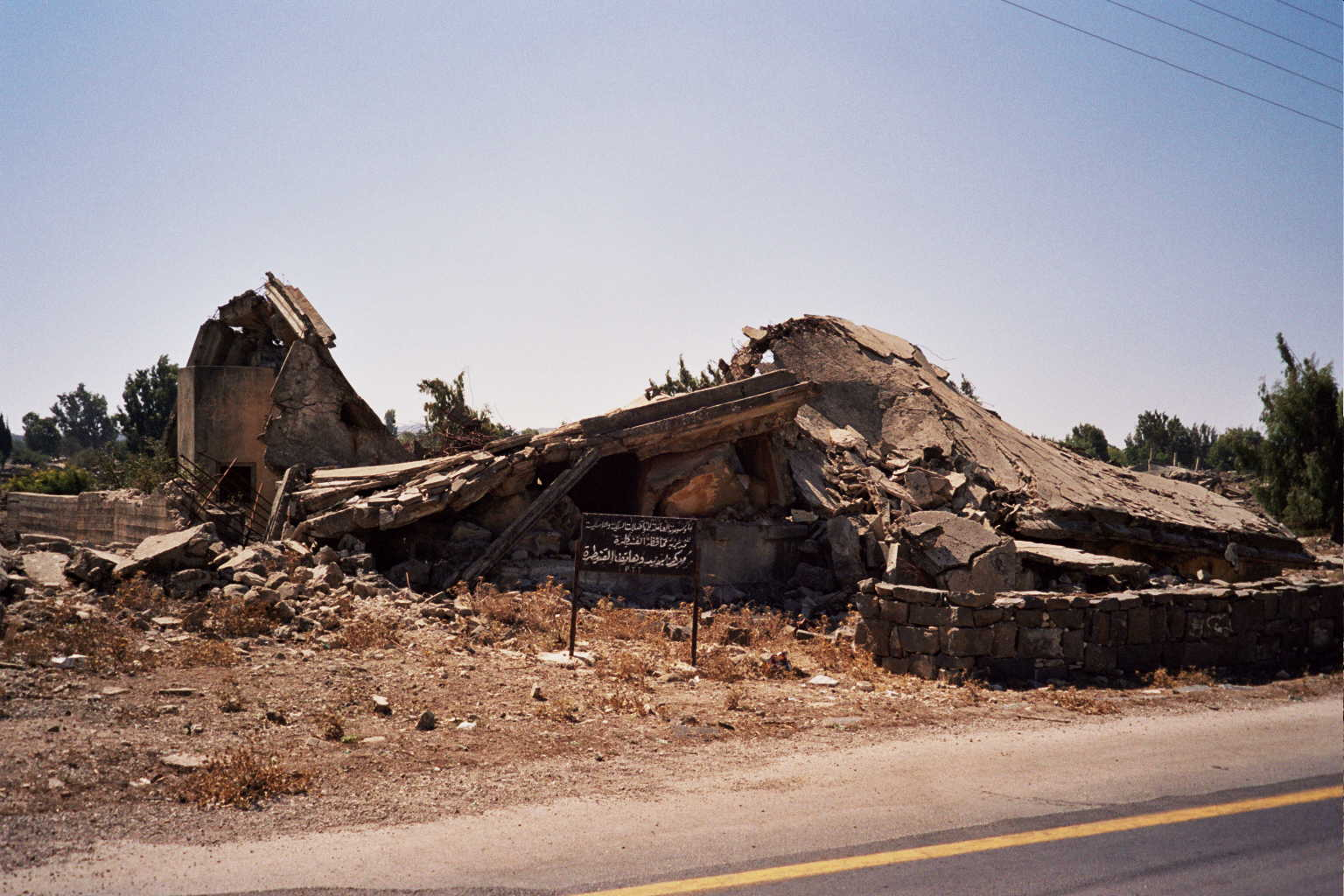
Destroyed building in Quneitra

Israel continued to control the city until early June 1974, when it was returned to Syrian civilian control following the signature of a United States-brokered disengagement agreement signed on 31 May 1974. The surrender of Quneitra was controversial, with Israeli settlers and the Likud and National Religious Party opposing it. According to Michael Mandelbaum, the agreement provided that the city was to be repopulated to serve as evidence of peaceful Syrian intentions, by doing so it would encourage the Israelis to pull back further.

In an attempt to block the withdrawal, a group of settlers from Merom Golan – a settlement established in 1967 – took over an abandoned bunker in Quneitra and declared it to be a new settlement called Keshet (Quneitra in Hebrew). The settlers also set about razing the existing town to the ground. The leader of Merom Golan, Yehuda Harel, and another Merom Golan member, Shimshon Wollner, initiated the destruction of Quneitra, which was carried out by the Land Development Administration of the Jewish National Fund. Harel later described what happened:

Shimshon and I walked around Quneitra all day and tried decide what to do. And then these two strange ideas came up. One was to establish a settlement in Quneitra and the second was to destroy Quneitra.

Wollner and Harel asked the Jewish National Fund to carry out the work, ostensibly to prepare an area for agricultural cultivation, but were refused as they did not have permission from the Israeli army. They then approached the Assistant to the Head of Northern Command and asked him to mark on a map which buildings the army needed. According to Harel,

So he took a felt pen and marked the hospital and a few other places – he wrote "not for destruction" and on other places he wrote "for destruction" and he signed. He thought he was signing about what not to destroy but he was actually writing to destroy . . . The tractors of the Jewish National Fund did the destroying. They weren't our tractors . . . I can tell you that even the tractor drivers were Arabs.

The buildings were systematically stripped, with anything movable being removed and sold to Israeli contractors, before they were pulled apart with tractors and bulldozers.

The disengagement went into force on 6 June. On 26 June, the Syrian president Hafez al-Assad travelled to Quneitra where he pledged to return the rest of the occupied territories to Syrian control. Western reporters accompanied Syrian refugees returning to the city in early July 1974 and described what they saw on the ground. Time magazine's correspondent reported that "Most of its buildings are knocked flat, as though by dynamite, or pockmarked by shellfire." Le Monde's Syria correspondent, in a report for The Times, gave a detailed eyewitness description of the destruction:

Today the city is unrecognisable. The houses with their roofs lying on the ground look like gravestones. Parts of the rubble are covered with fresh earth furrowed by bulldozer tracks. Everywhere there are fragments of furniture, discarded kitchen utensils, Hebrew newspapers dating from the first week of June; here a ripped-up mattress, there the springs of an old sofa. On the few sections of wall still standing, Hebrew inscriptions proclaim: "There'll be another round"; "You want Quneitra, you'll have it destroyed."

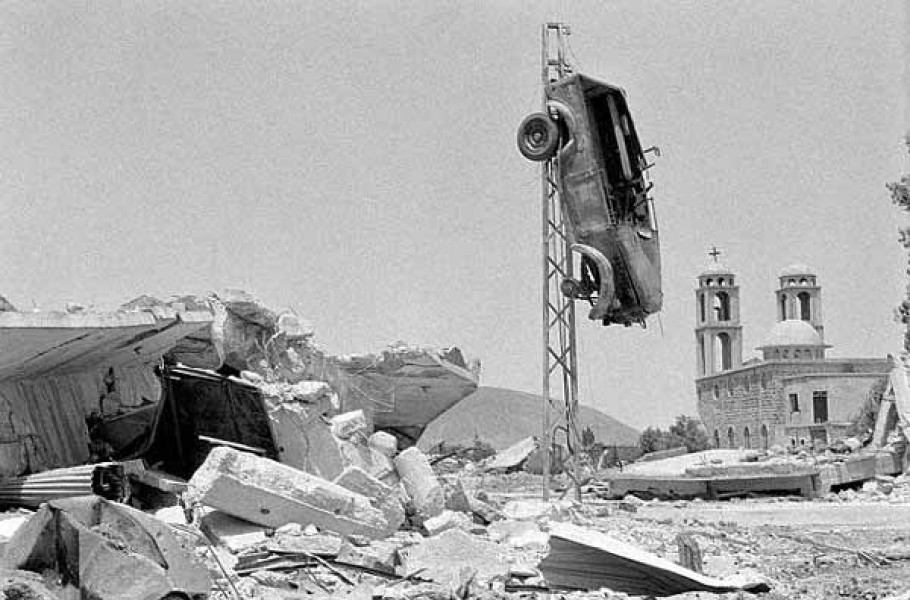
Ruins in the town in 1974

Israel asserted that most of the damage had been caused in the two wars and during the artillery duels in between. Several reports from before the withdrawal did refer to the city as "ruined" and "shell-scarred". The Times' correspondent saw the city for himself on 6 May, a month before the Israeli withdrawal, and described it as being "in ruins and deserted after seven years of war and dereliction. It looks like a wild west city struck by an earthquake and if the Syrians get it back they will face a major feat of reconstruction. Nearly every building is heavily damaged and scores have collapsed."

Direct evidence of the city's condition was provided when it was filmed on 12 May 1974 by a British television news team which included the veteran journalist Peter Snow, who was reporting for Independent Television News on the disengagement negotiations. His report was broadcast on ITN's News at Ten programme. According to The Times' correspondent Edward Mortimer, "viewers were thus afforded a panoramic view of the city, which had stood almost completely empty since the Syrian army evacuated it in 1967. It could be seen that many of the buildings were damaged, but most of them were still standing." After it was handed over, "very few buildings were left standing. Most of those destroyed did not present the jagged outline and random heaps of rubble usually produced by artillery or aerial bombardment. The roofs lay flat on the ground, 'pancaked' in a manner which I am told can only be achieved by systematic dynamiting of the support walls inside." Mortimer concluded that the footage "establishes beyond reasonable doubt that much of the destruction took place after 12 May—at a time when there was no fighting anywhere near Kuneitra."

The United Nations established a Special Committee to Investigate Israeli Practices Affecting the Human Rights of the Population of the Occupied Territories, which engaged a Swiss engineer Edward Gruner to investigate the damage. Gruner and a team of surveyors spent four months in Quneitra, documenting every building and its condition. His report concluded that Israeli forces had deliberately destroyed the city prior to their withdrawal, including almost 4,000 buildings and a large amount of infrastructure, of value estimated at 463 million Syrian pounds. The report's conclusions were subsequently adopted by the United Nations General Assembly. It passed a resolution on 29 November 1974 describing the destruction of Quneitra as "a grave breach of the [Fourth] Geneva Convention" and "condemn[ing] Israel for such acts," by a margin of 93 votes to 8, with 74 abstentions. The United Nations Commission on Human Rights also voted to condemn the "deliberate destruction and devastation" of Quneitra in a resolution of 22 February 1975, by a margin of 22 votes to one (the United States) with nine abstentions.

==== As a city ruin ====
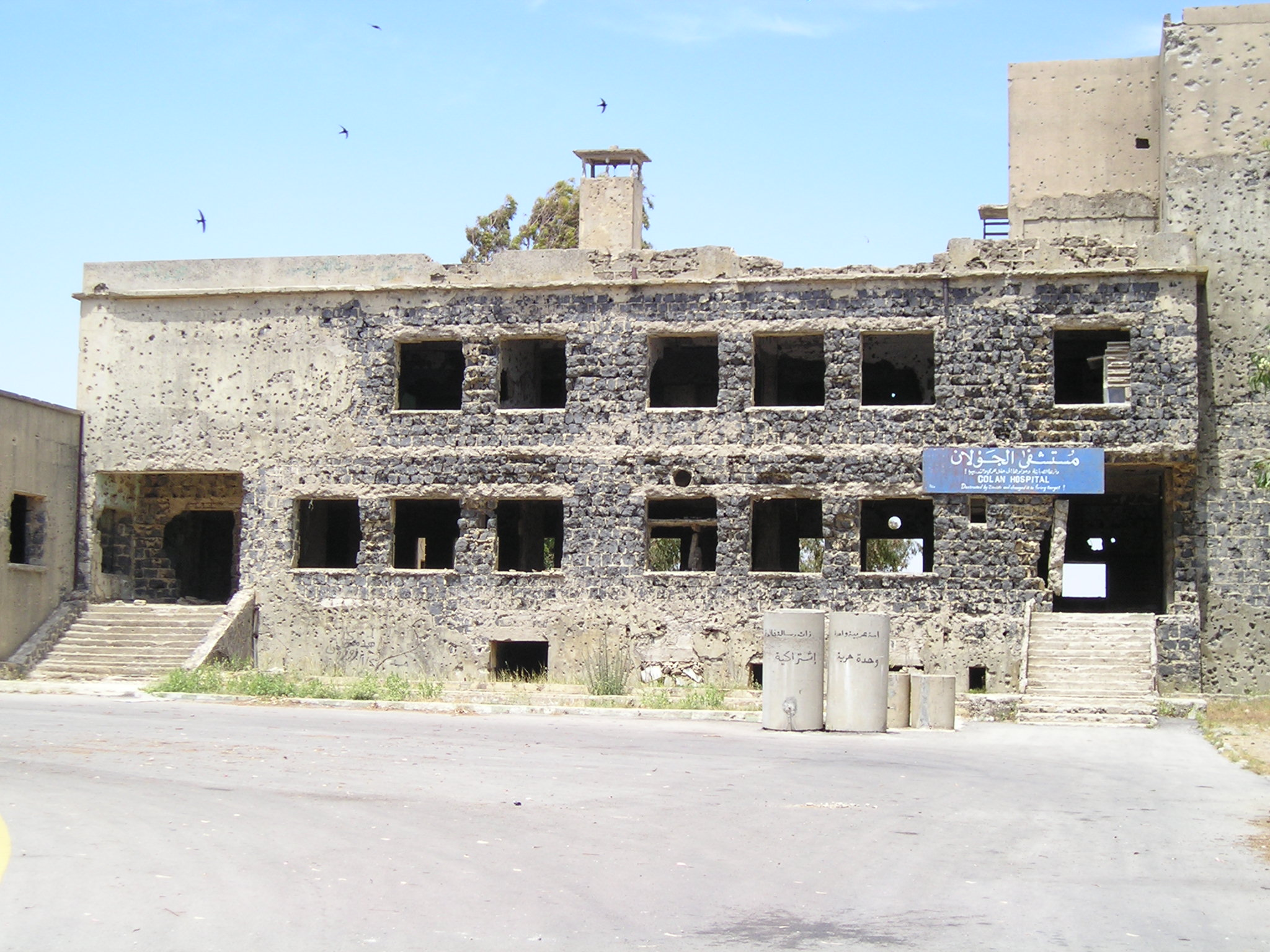
Quneitra hospital. The sign reads: "Golan Hospital. Destructed by Zionists and changed it to firing target!" [sic]. Following the 2024 Israeli invasion of Syria, the hospital was completely demolished by the Israeli military on January 20, 2026.

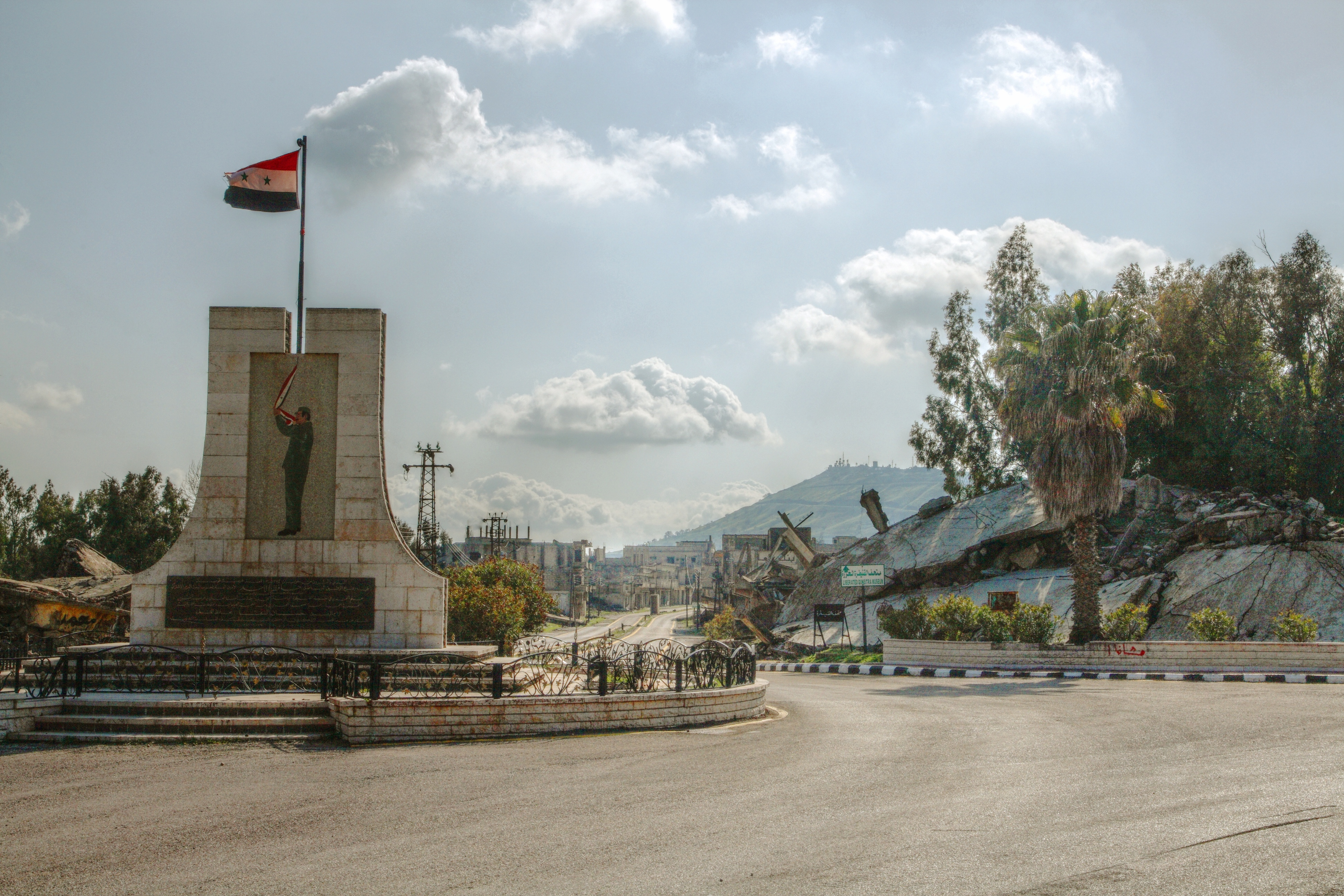
The entrance to the city

The city remains in a destroyed condition. Syria has left the ruins in place and built a museum to memorialize its destruction. It maintains billboards at the ruins of many buildings and effectively preserves it in the condition that the Israeli army left it in. The former residents of the town have not returned and Syria discourages the re-population of the area. However, in the 2004 census by the Central Bureau of Statistics, a small population of 153 people living in 28 households was recorded, all living in the neighborhood of Rasm al-Rawabi. The Rough Guide to Syria describes the appearance of the city in 2001: "The first sight of the flattened houses on Quneitra's outskirts is the most dramatic; many of the unscathed roofs simply lie on top of a mass of rubble, leaving the impression of a building that has imploded."

The city has often been used as a stop for foreign VIPs, ranging from the Soviet foreign minister Alexei Kosygin in June 1976 to Pope John Paul II in May 2001. Only a handful of families now live in the town, making a living by providing services for the United Nations troops patrolling the demilitarized zone. According to The Times, "the carefully preserved ruined city has become a pilgrimage site for a generation of Syrians."

Prior to the Syrian Civil War, the city could be visited by tourists with a permit from the Syrian Ministry of the Interior and under the supervision of a military guide. The principal sights on the standard tour were the remains of Quneitra's hospital, mosque and Greek Orthodox church. A "Liberated Quneitra Museum", displaying artifacts from the city's ancient and medieval past, is housed in the former Ottoman Turkish caravanserai in the city centre. The western edge of the city marks the start of "no-man's land" beyond which lies Israeli-controlled territory. It was and still is not possible to visit Quneitra directly from Israel.

=== Civil war ===
On 13 November 2012, during the ongoing Syrian Civil War, which had begun in March 2011, Syria′s president Bashar al-Assad issued a decreed establishment of a branch of the University of Damascus in Quneitra.

On 6 June 2013, the nearby Quneitra border crossing was attacked by rebel forces and temporarily occupied, with Syrian army later retaking the crossing; In July 2013, opposition forces attacked a military checkpoint in Quneitra, and by the next day were attacking several Syrian Arab Army positions in Quneitra.

In August 2014, rebel forces captured the crossing. A Filipino peacekeeper of the UNDOF was wounded during the fighting. As a result the Austrian government announced the withdrawal of its troops from the UN mission.

On 26 July 2018, the Syrian Army took back the town of Quneitra after rebels surrendered and handed over the heavy and medium weapons to army.

=== Israeli re-occupation ===
Israeli forces entered Quneitra following the collapse of Syrian government control in December 2024 and occupied the nearby buffer zone, with residents saying troops and patrols appeared in and around the city as the area came under Israeli military presence.

On 12 March 2025, parts of Al-Hassan bin al-Haytham Secondary School were damaged during a destruction operation. On 6 January 2026, the Israeli military destroyed the historic al-Golan hospital in Quneitra. Later that month, on 20 January, the Israeli military demolished the historic al-Andalus Cinema in Quenitra.

== Religious buildings ==
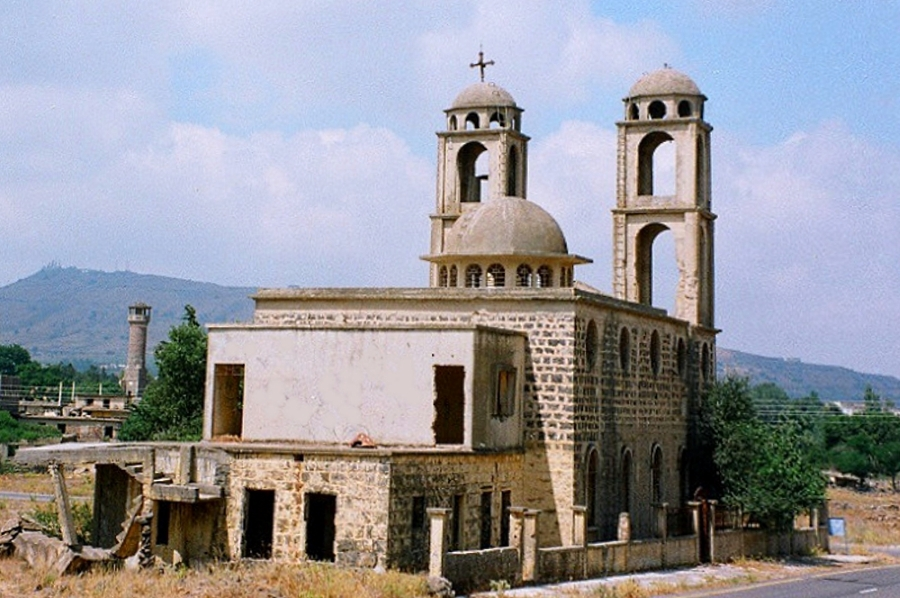
St. George Greek Orthodox Church

- St. George Greek Orthodox Church

== See also ==
- Quneitra Crossing
- Shebaa Farms
- Syrian towns and villages depopulated in the Arab-Israeli conflict
- 1974 Kuneitra Cup
