= Mazhar al-Wais =

Syrian Minister of Justice since 2025

- مظهر الويس
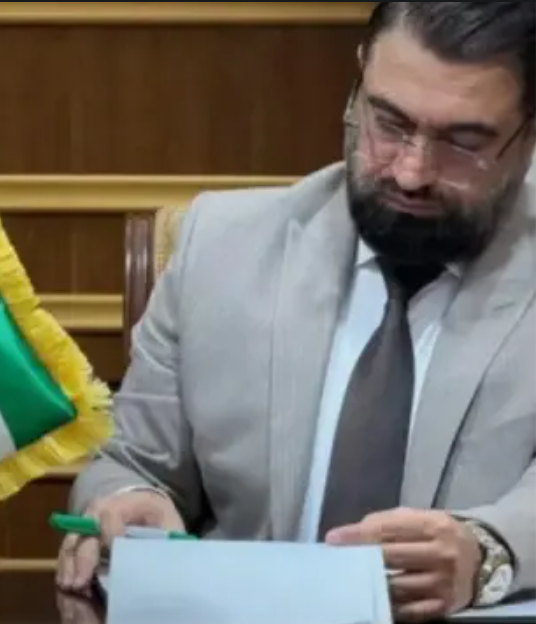
- al-Wais in January 2026

Minister of Justice
- Incumbent
- Assumed office 29 March 2025
- President: Ahmed al-Sharaa
- Preceded by: Shadi al-Waisi

Personal details
- Born: 1980 (age 45–46) Deir ez-Zor Governorate, Syria
- Party: Independent (since 2025)
- Other political affiliations: Hay'at Tahrir al-Sham (until 2025)

Mazhar Abdul Rahman al-Wais (Arabic: مظهر عبد الرحمن الويس; born 1980) is a Syrian Islamic scholar and former militant leader who is the current Minister of Justice in the Syrian transitional government since March 2025.

He had previously served as the head of the Sharia Authority in Eastern Syria and a member of the Shura Council of Mujahideen in the Eastern Region. He later became a prominent jurist in Hay'at Tahrir al-Sham (HTS) and held positions within the Ministry of Justice of the Syrian Salvation Government.

== Early life and imprisonment ==
Al-Wais studied medicine at Damascus University before switching to Islamic studies at the Al-Fath Islamic Institute, specializing in comparative jurisprudence.

In 2008, he was arrested by the Ba'athist Syrian intelligence services and imprisoned at Far' Falastin then Sednaya Prison and was sentenced for eight years. During his imprisonment, he participated in three major prison uprisings led by Islamist detainees.

== Role in the Syrian Civil War ==
Al-Wais was released in April 2013, nearly two years after an amnesty in May 2011 that freed many Islamist prisoners. Following his release, he became the head of the Sharia Authority in Eastern Syria, which was reorganized after the split between Jabhat al-Nusra and the Islamic State (ISIL) in June 2013. During his tenure, he expanded the activities of the authority.

He was also a member of the Shura Council of the Mujahideen in the Eastern Region and served as its official spokesperson. Additionally, he was among the founding members of the Shura Council of Scholars in the Levant.

After the formation of Hay'at Tahrir al-Sham (HTS) on 27 January 2017, al-Wais became a leading religious figure within the group. He appeared in a video released by HTS in March 2017, alongside other prominent jurists such as Muslih al-Ulyani, Abdullah al-Muhaysini, and Abu Yusuf al-Hamawi, ahead of battles in Hama Governorate. He also held positions in the judiciary of the Syrian Salvation Government, including leading the Supreme Judicial Council.

In August 2022, media reports suggested that Ahmed al-Sharaa, the general commander of HTS, had resigned and was replaced by al-Wais. However, HTS's media office denied these claims.

== Role in Lebanon–Syria Prisoner Transfer (2026) ==
In February 2026, Al-Wais signed a judicial cooperation agreement with Lebanon enabling the transfer of convicted inmates to serve their sentences in their country of nationality. The agreement provided for the repatriation of approximately 300 Syrian prisoners from Lebanese prisons during its initial phase of implementation.

Al-Wais stated that the agreement would “boost existing confidence” between the two countries and expressed hope that bilateral relations would progress further.

== Minister of Justice ==
On 29 March 2025 al-Wais was appointed minister of Justice in the Syrian transitional government.

== Controversies ==
On 1 August 2020, he tweeted his opinion that the Alawites are a "despicable minority which enslaved the Sunni majority".
