= Anita Asmah =

Ghanaian army personnel and lawyer

Head of Mission and Force Commander of the United Nations Disengagement Observer Force (Note: Acting in 2022)
- Incumbent
- Assumed office 11 December 2024 (formally in command since 4 February 2025) Serving with Patrick Gauchat (in December 2024 to January 2025)
- Preceded by: Nirmal Kumar Thapa
- In office July 2022 – November 2022
- Deputy: Herself
- Preceded by: Ishwar Hamal
- Succeeded by: Nirmal Kumar Thapa

Deputy Head of Mission and Force Commander of the United Nations Disengagement Observer Force
- In office 2021–2023

Personal details
- Born: February 1965 (age 61)
- Children: One daughter

Anita Asmah (born February 1965) is a Ghanaian Major General and lawyer who has served as Head of Mission and Force Commander of the United Nations Disengagement Observer Force since December 2024.

== Early life and education ==
Asmah was born in February 1965. She has six siblings. Her father was a Colonel in the Armed Forces and she attended preparatory school in Burma Camp and at the Armed Forces experimental school. She then attended Aburi Girls' Senior High School.

Asmah graduated with a Bachelor of Arts in modern languages (English, French and Arabic) from the University of Ghana. She returned to the university later to obtain a Bachelor of Laws and then obtained a practicing certificate from the Ghana School of Law. She has completed various military training courses including a Mission Training Officer's Course in Croatia and a Women in Leadership course at Kennesaw State University in the US.

== Career ==
Asmah was commissioned into the Ghana Armed Forces in 1992. She rose through the ranks to take on roles including Director of Education, Deputy Military Secretary, and Course Director at the Kofi Annan International Peacekeeping Training Centre.

Asmah was a military observer in the United Nations Organization Mission in the Democratic Republic of the Congo from 2003 to 2004. She was a staff officer in the United Nations Interim Force in Lebanon from 2012 to 2013 and again from 2015 to 2016. She served as Director General in the Department of Defence Civilian Establishment of the Ghana Armed Forces from 2021 until 2023.

Asmah served as Deputy Force Commander of the United Nations Disengagement Observer Force (UNDOF) from 2021 to 2023, including serving as Acting Force Commander between July and November 2022. On 11 December 2024, UN Secretary-General António Guterres announced Asmah as Head of Mission and Force Commander of UNDOF. She is the first African woman to hold the position. She formally took command from Patrick Gauchat on 4 February 2025 in a HOTO Ceremony at Camp Faouar in Syria.

Asmah is an advocate for gender equality and praised the UN's Uniformed Gender Parity Strategy saying, "Only by excelling in our responsibilities can we pave the way for more women to take on command positions and truly transform the landscape of peacekeeping operations."

== Personal life ==
Asmah has one daughter.
