= Shadi al-Waisi =

Syrian politician (born 1985)

- شادي الويسي

Minister of Justice
- In office 10 December 2024 – 29 March 2025
- President: Ahmed al-Sharaa (Note: As de facto leader until 29 January 2025.)
- Prime Minister: Mohammed al-Bashir
- Preceded by: Ahmad al-Sayyed
- Succeeded by: Mazhar al-Wais

Minister of Justice in the Syrian Salvation Government
- In office 2022 – 10 December 2024
- Prime Minister: Ali Keda; Mohammed al-Bashir
- Succeeded by: Position abolished

Personal details
- Born: 1985 (age 40–41) Aleppo Governorate, Syria
- Party: Independent
- Other political affiliations: Hay'at Tahrir al-Sham (until 2025)
- Occupation: Politician, judge

Military service
- Allegiance: Current: Syrian Arab Republic (2024–present); Former: Al-Nusra Front (until 2016); Jabhat Fateh al-Sham (2016–2017); Syrian Salvation Government (2017–2024); Hay'at Tahrir al-Sham (2017–2025)

Shadi Mohammed al-Waisi (Note: Arabic: شادي محمد الويسي; born 1985) is a Syrian politician and former rebel leader who served as the Minister of Justice in the Syrian caretaker government from December 2024 to March 2025. He had also served as Minister of Justice in the Syrian Salvation Government during its sixth term, starting in 2022 and up until the December 2024 fall of the Assad regime.

== Education ==
Al-Waisi holds a degree in Islamic Sharia and a diploma in educational qualification. He is also working on a master's thesis in Islamic and judicial studies. Prior to his judicial and political career, he worked as an Islamic education teacher and served as an imam and preacher in Aleppo for seven years.

== During the Syrian civil war ==
=== Al-Nusra ===
In a video, filmed in January 2015 in Maarrat Misrin, al-Waisi can reportedly be seen among the spectators at a public execution. The video shows a woman being executed with a single bullet to the head after being allegedly convicted of prostitution.

In another video, recorded approximately one week later in Hafasraja, a similar execution took place for a woman under the same charges. This time, al-Waisi, who was a judge for the Al-Nusra Front, is seen personally delivering the verdict next to the condemned woman and signaling the executioner to proceed. The execution was carried out with a single bullet to the head.

=== Syrian Salvation Government ===
During the Syrian Civil War, he played a role in the establishment of judicial institutions in areas under the control of opposition factions. He co-founded the Sharia Authority in Dhahret Awad and served as a judge. Later, he joined the founding cadre of the Quadripartite Sharia Authority in Aleppo, where he held positions as a military misdemeanor judge, an appeals judge, and the public prosecutor.

Al-Waisi also founded and presided over the Judicial Circuit Project and established key judicial institutions, including the Salqin Court, Hreitan Court, and the Northern Badiya Court. In addition to these roles, he has served as the head of the Civil Felonies Court and the Criminal Appeals Court under the Syrian Salvation Government. He is also a member of the Supreme Judicial Council.

== Minister of Justice ==
In 2024, al-Waisi began serving as the Minister of Justice in the Syrian caretaker government under prime minister Mohammed al-Bashir after the fall of the Assad regime and the decision that ministers of the salvation government will serve in the same roles in the transitional government until March 2025.

Videos of al-Waisi approving executions of women dating back to his tenure as a judge for the Al-Nusra Front resurfaced shortly after he was appointed as minister of justice and sparked criticism.

On 29 March 2025, Mazhar al-Wais succeeded al-Waisi as Minister of Justice with the formation of the Syrian transitional government.

== See also ==
- Cabinet of Syria
- Syrian transitional government
