= Quneitra Crossing =

Ceasefire line crossing in the Golan Heights

Quneitra Crossing تقاطع القنيطرة מעבר קוניטרה
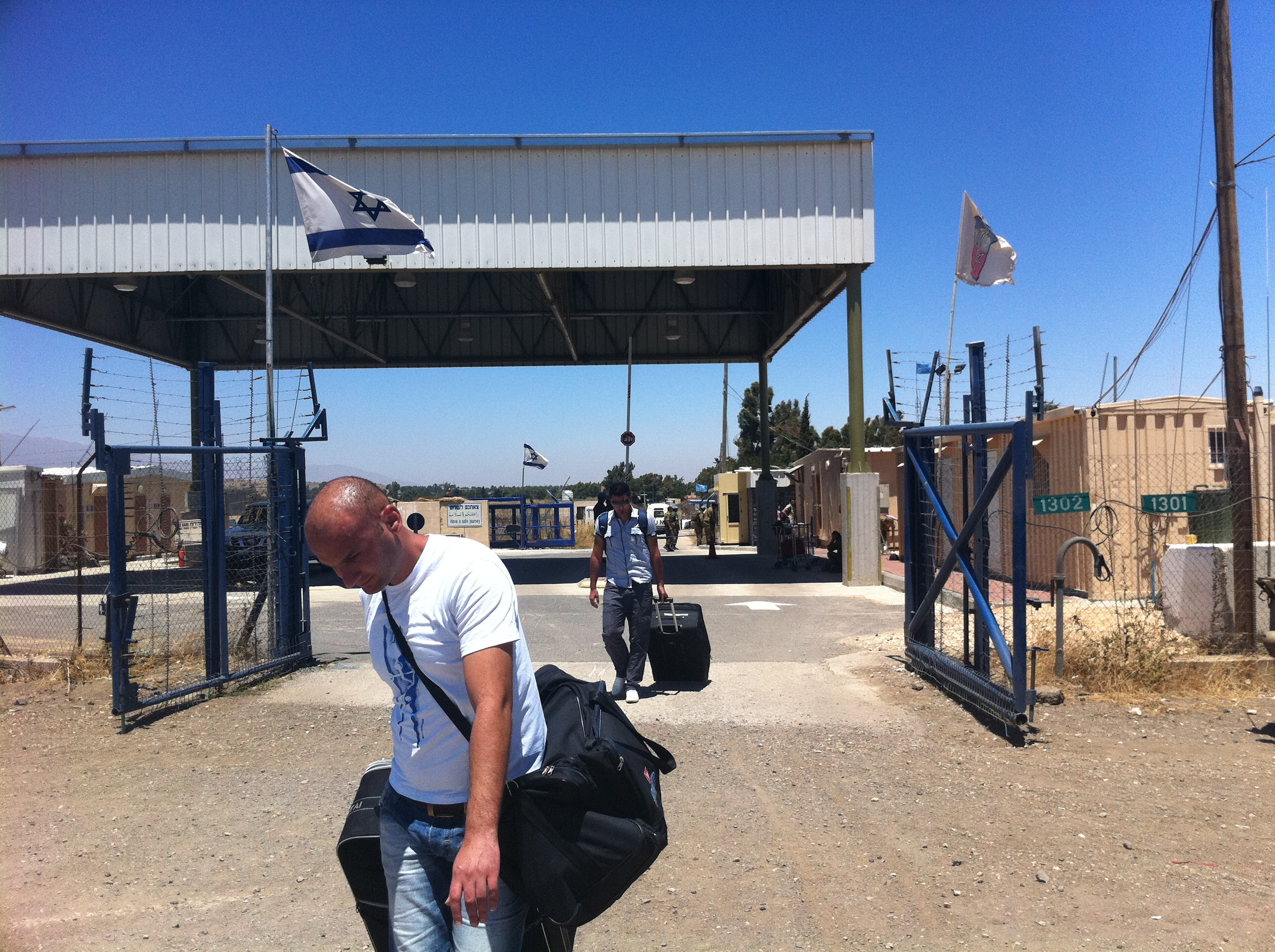
- Israeli-occupied side of the Quneitra Crossing
- Coordinates: 33°06′46″N 35°48′57″E
- Carries: Pedestrians, commercial goods, humanitarian missions
- Crosses: Purple Line
- Locale: Golan Heights
- Begins: Quneitra, Syria (Syrian-controlled side)
- Ends: Near Ein Zivan, Israeli-occupied Golan Heights
- Official name: Quneitra Crossing
- Named for: Quneitra
- Maintained by: Israel Defense Forces, UNDOF, International Committee of the Red Cross

Characteristics
- Design: Border crossing
- Traversable?: Yes, under UNDOF supervision

History
- Opened: After the Yom Kippur War (1973)
- Closed: Temporarily in 2013 and 2014 due to fighting

Statistics
- Daily traffic: Limited, used for Druze civilians, humanitarian aid, and UN peacekeeping operations
- Toll: None

Location
- Interactive map of Quneitra Crossing

The Quneitra Crossing (Arabic: تقاطع القنيطرة, Hebrew: מעבר קוניטרה) is a border crossing through the purple ceasefire line into the UNDOF controlled area between the Syrian controlled and the Israeli-occupied portion of the Golan Heights. It is on the southwestern outskirts of Quneitra, and not far from the Israeli settlement of Ein Zivan in the Golan Heights. Syrian Druze from the Golan Heights are permitted to cross through the passage to study, work and live in Syria proper. The crossing is also used for the transfer of apples grown by Druze farmers under the auspices of the Red Cross. The only concrete guard post along the ceasefire line is at the Quneitra crossing.

== History ==
The opening of a crossing at Quneitra took place after the Yom Kippur War in 1973. The UN Disengagement Observer Force (UNDOF) established its headquarters along the border. In order to carry out its work, UNDOF needed to move freely between Israel and Syria.

Since 2004, Druze have exported apples to Syria through the crossing. In 2010, some 10,000 tons of apples grown by Druze farmers in the Golan Heights were sent to Syria. In 2010, the Israeli government authorized a pilgrimage to Syria by a group of 300 Druze citizens of Israel interested in visiting religious sites there. A group of dancers from five Druze villages in the Golan Heights was sent to Aleppo to perform in a dabka competition. Israeli Druze civilians are permitted to cross the border at Quneitra for university studies and marriage. Since 1993, 67 Syrian brides have crossed into the Golan Heights and 11 brides from the Golan have crossed into Syria through the Quneitra crossing. This issue was the topic of the award-winning movie, The Syrian Bride.

The terminal usually closes at 6 p.m. but can be opened at any time to handle humanitarian emergencies, such as the transfer to Israel of a Druze dentistry student who suffered a stroke while studying in Syria.

On 6 June 2013 the crossing was attacked by Syrian rebels and temporarily occupied. Syrian government forces were able to quickly retake the crossing. A Filipino peacekeeper of the UNDOF was wounded during the fighting. As a result, the Austrian government announced to withdraw its troops from the UN mission.

On 27 August 2014 Syrian rebels again occupied the crossing.

Quneitra was reopened on 15 October 2018, for UNDOF personnel.

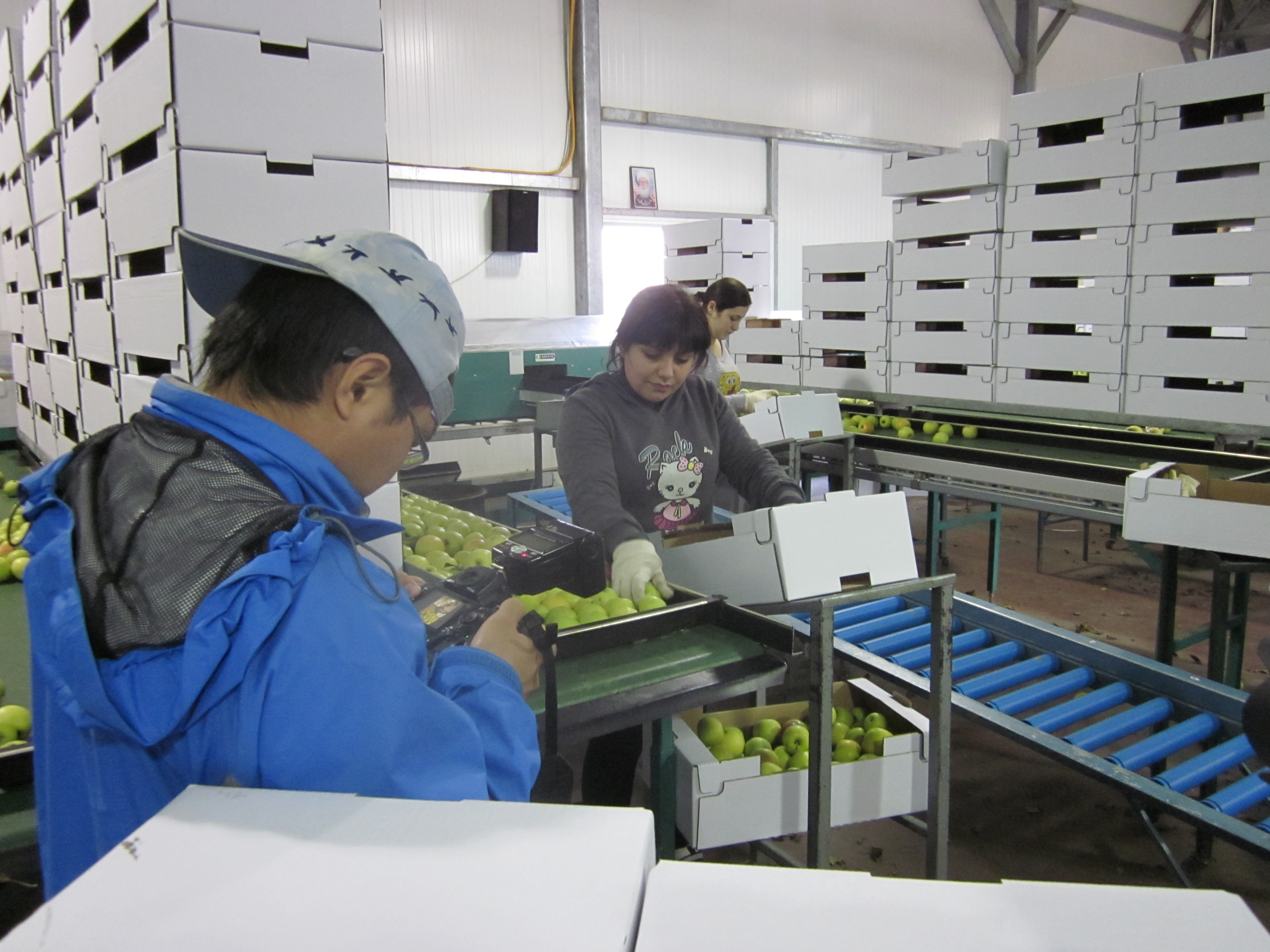
Apples in the Golan Heights being transferred to Syria via the Quneitra crossing

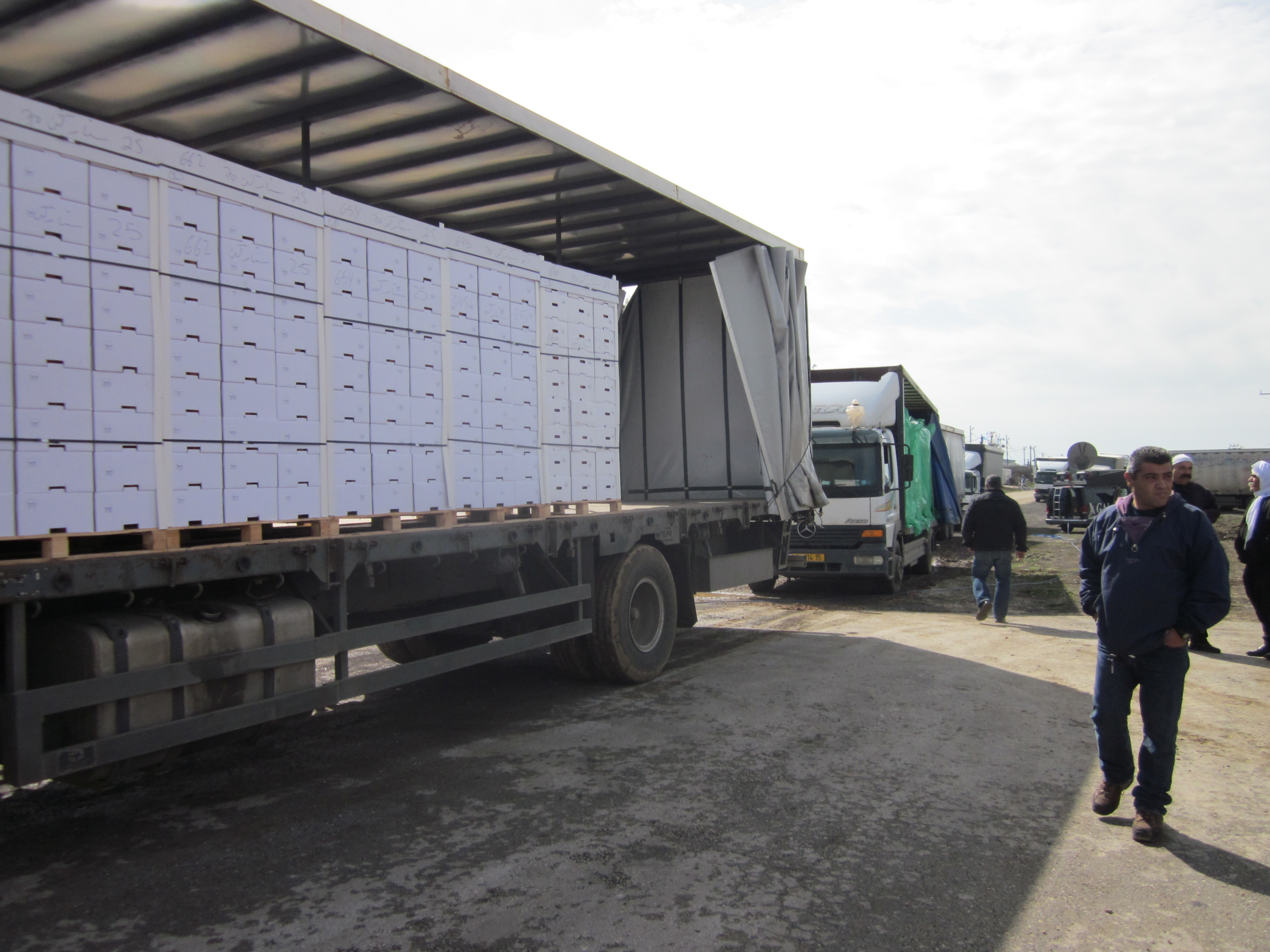
Apples transferred to Syria at Quneitra crossing, February 2011
