= Hisham Al Shaar =

Syrian politician (born 1958)

Hisham Al Shaar (born 1958) is a Syrian judge and politician who served as the justice minister between 2017 and 2020.

== Biography ==
Al Shaar was born in Damascus in 1958. He is a judge by profession. As of 2014 he was chief of the Syrian Higher Judicial Committee for Elections. In a cabinet reshuffle dated March 2017 he was appointed justice minister replacing Najm Hamad Al Ahmad in the post. Al Shaar is one of the Syrian politicians who were sanctioned by the European Union in 2017 and 2020.
