= Patrick Gauchat =

Swiss General

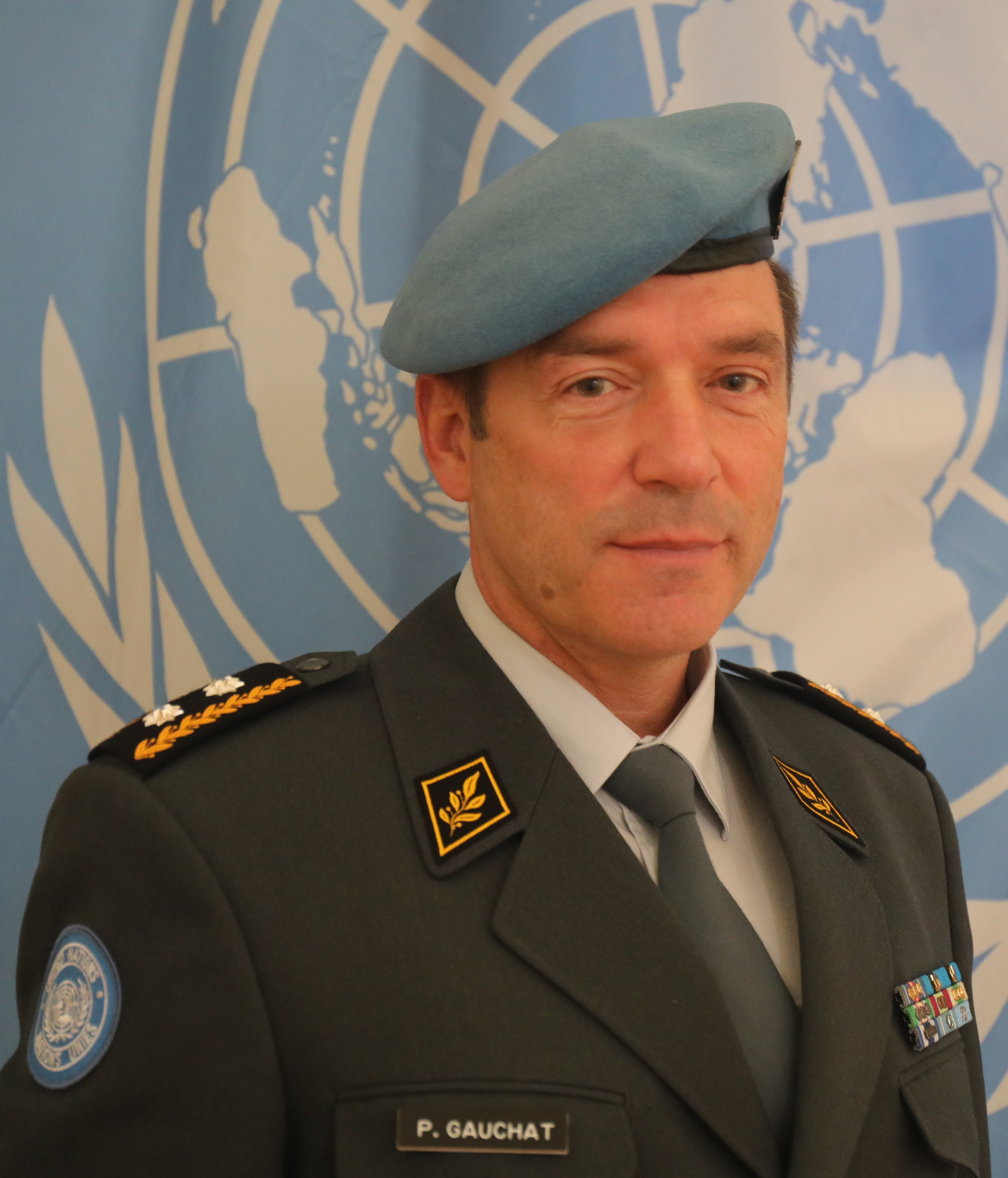

Patrick Gauchat (22 May 1968) is a Swiss General Officer. He is the first Swiss to lead a UN Mission.

== Military career ==
=== Training and first command ===
Promotions

- 1997 Captain
- 2004 Major
- 2006 Lieutenant Colonel
- 2009 Colonel
- 2017 Major General

After training, Gauchat took command of a mountain fusilier company (1997).

=== Service as a staff officer ===
As a staff officer, he performed various commanding duties, including commander of a mountain infantry battalion (2006-2008), deputy commander of the Tenth Mountain Infantry Brigade 10 (2014–2015) and deputy commander of Territorial Division 1 (2016–2017).

=== Service in the rank of general ===
In 2017, he was appointed head of the Swiss delegation to the Neutral Monitoring Commission for the Armistice between the Two Koreas (NNSC). In 2021, he was appointed head of the UN peacekeeping mission United Nations Truce Supervision Organization supervising ceasefires in Middle East (UNTSO).

=== Overseas assignments ===
- 2000 UN Military Observer, UNTSO, Middle East
- 2004 Deputy Head of the Swiss Delegation NNSC, Korea
- 2009 Head of Peacebuilding MONUSCO, later: MONUSCO, Congo und Somalia
- 2011 Deputy Head of Mission UNTSO in Jerusalem
- 2013 Commander Sector North (JRD-N) at NATO's KFOR-Mission in Kosovo
- 2014 Senior Officer Middle East and Asia, HQ at UN, New York City
- 2017 Head of the Swiss delegation to the Neutral Nations Supervisory Commission (NNSC) (Korea)
- 2021 Head of Mission/Chief of Staff UNTSO

== Private life ==
Gauchat holds engineering degree from the École Polytechnique Fédérale de Lausanne and is fluent in German, English, French, and Spanish.
