= United Nations Security Council Resolution 350 =

UN Security Council Resolution 350
- Aftermath of the Yom Kippur War
- Date: 31 May 1974
- Meeting no.: 1,774
- Code: S/RES/350 (Document)
- Subject: Israel-Syrian Arab Republic
- Voting summary: 13 voted for; None voted against; None abstained
- Result: Adopted

Security Council composition
- Permanent members: China; France; Soviet Union; United Kingdom; United States
- Non-permanent members: Australia; Austria; Byelorussian SSR; Cameroon; Costa Rica; Indonesia; Iraq; Kenya; Mauritania; Peru

United Nations Security Council Resolution 350, adopted on 31 May 1974, established the United Nations Disengagement Observer Force, to monitor the ceasefire between Israel and Syria in the wake of the Yom Kippur War. UNDOF was initially established for a period of six months, but has had its mandate renewed by subsequent resolutions.

Resolution 350 was adopted by 13 votes to none, with China and Iraq not participating in the voting.

== See also ==
- Arab–Israeli conflict
- Purple Line
- List of United Nations Security Council Resolutions 301 to 400 (1971–1976)
