= October 2023 Northern Syria clashes =

Turkish-Syrian military conflict

- Part of the Turkish involvement in the Syrian civil war
Date	5 – 9 October 2023 (4 days)
Location	Aleppo, Raqqa and Hasakah Governorates, Northern Syria

Belligerents
Turkey	Autonomous Administration of North and East Syria Syrian Arab Republic

Units involved
Turkish Armed Forces; Turkish Air Force; Turkish Land Forces	People's Protection Units; Manbij Military Council; Asayish; Syrian Armed Forces

Casualties and losses
Per SOHR: (Turkey) 8 killed, 7+ wounded 3 killed Equipment: 1 Anka-S combat drone	(Democratic Autonomous Administration of North and East Syria) 40 killed 37 wounded 2 killed 3 wounded
- 6 civilians killed

Starting on 5 October 2023, the Turkish Armed Forces launched a series of air and ground strikes targeting the Syrian Democratic Forces in Northeastern Syria. The airstrikes were launched in response to the 2023 Ankara bombing, which the Turkish government alleges was carried out by attackers originating from Northeastern Syria.

== Background ==
On 1 October 2023, a suicide bombing took place in the Turkish capital, Ankara. The attack injured two policemen and was claimed by the Kurdistan Workers’ Party (PKK). On 4 October, Turkish Foreign Minister Hakan Fidan stated that the attackers had entered Turkey through Syria and had received training there. He further added that all infrastructure, superstructure, and energy facilities belonging to the SDF in Syria are now legitimate targets of Turkey's armed forces.

== Clashes ==
On 5 October 2023, the Turkish Air Force conducted 38 airstrikes in the Aleppo and Hasakah Governorates of Northern Syria, resulting in the deaths of 10 people. During the airstrikes, the international coalition (CJTF–OIR) shot down an armed Turkish combat drone after it approached the coalition base near the town of Tal Baidar. Two members of the Turkish Special Forces were killed later that day when Syrian government forces conducted an artillery shelling attack on their base near the town of Dabiq.

On 6 October, the number of Turkish airstrikes in northeastern Syria increased to 64. The targets of these airstrikes were critical infrastructure such as oil, gas, and power stations, as well as dams and oil pipelines in the Qahtaniyah region of Hasakah. At least seven people were killed during these airstrikes.

On 7 October, the number of Turkish airstrikes in northeastern Syria increased to 70. Two Turkish troops and one civilian were killed.

On 8 October, Turkish airstrikes targeted the headquarters of the Asayish in Al-Malikiyah District, killing 30 and wounding 37 others.

On 9 October, a Syrian soldier died due to Turkish shellings in Aleppo Province. In addition, 4 Turkish soldiers were killed in a missile attack by Tel Tamr Military Council on Al-Dawadiya base of Turkish forces. Also 3 fighters of Ahrar al-Sharqiya Faction were killed.

== See also ==
- June 2023 Northeastern Syria clashes
- Aleppo clashes (2025–2026)
- Operation Claw-Sword
