= Administrative Council of Jabal Bashan =

De facto local authority in Suwayda

Administrative Council of Jabal Bashan مجلس الإدارة في جبل باشان
- Flags

- Territory of the Council as of 20 August 2026 which are controlled by the National Guard
- Status: Unrecognized legal-administrative authority
- Capital: Suwayda
- Government: Legal-administrative technocratic authority
- Leader
  - Since 2026: Hikmat al-Hijri (Note: The spiritual leadership of the Druze in Syria has been split into two since the 2010s; one arm is headed by Hikmat al-Hijri, while the other is mutually headed by Hammoud al-Hinnawi and Youssef Jarbou.)
- Overseer
  - Since 2026: Shadi Fayez Murshid
- Establishment: Aftermath of the Syrian civil war
  - Established: 7 April 2026

Area
  - Total: 2,280 km^{2} (880 sq mi)
- Currency: Syrian pound (SYP)
- Time zone: UTC+3 (AST)
Preceded by
Supreme Legal Committee in Suwayda

The Administrative Council of Jabal Bashan (Arabic: مجلس الإدارة في جبل باشان) (Note: Also called the Board of Directors in Jabal Bashan (Arabic: مجلس إدارة جبل باشان).) is a unilaterally declared, de facto autonomous legal-administrative authority in the city of Suwayda, established by Hikmat al-Hijri on 7 April 2026 during clashes in the region.

== History ==
=== Background ===
The Administrative Council of Jabal Bashan was established in the wake of protests in Al-Karama Square on 5 April. The protesters demanded the resignation of the Supreme Legal Committee in Suwayda, following a decline in quality of life in the city. One day before the replacement of the Supreme Committee on 6 April, an armed group stormed the Suwayda Education Directorate in the Syrian-controlled region of Suwayda, due to the replacement of Laila Jahjah with Safwan Ballan as director of education in Suwayda. Ballan consequently withdrew from the position, stating that he was complying with al-Hijri's decision and wanted to avoid further internal division.

=== Formation ===
On 7 April, the Druze spiritual leader, Hikmat al-Hijri, dissolved the Supreme Legal Committee in Suwayda and tasked Shadi Fayez Murshid, the commander of the Internal Security Forces, with forming the Administrative Council of Jabal Bashan. Al-Hijri stated that besides reorganizing administrative work, the board would operate according to professional standards and include specialists with experience to manage regional and population affairs. On 15 April, more than 15 people with administrative and political experience rejected Murshid's offer to participate in the council.

== Defence & security ==
The National Guard is a paramilitary force originally formed under the Supreme Legal Committee. It was formed through the amalgamation of numerous Druze factions in order to serve as a unified force for military and security efforts in Druze areas. Additionally, the Internal Security Forces are responsible for policing.

== Development ==
=== Important events ===
==== 2026 ====
===== April 2026 =====
On 11 April, people took to the streets at al-Karama Square to show their support for al-Hijri.

On 12 April, clashes took place between the Syrian Armed Forces and the National Guard along the Maghdal–Mazraa axis.

After Anad Makarem, a civilian, threatened the National Guard with a "popular uprising", an assassination attempt left him in critical condition. His family members, however, did not make any accusations, claiming that he was hit by a stray bullet; his brother denounced linking political motives to the incident.

On 27 April, it was reported that the car of commander Basel al-Shaer was targeted.

On 28 April, it was reported that the home of Rawad Abdul Khaleq, commander of the “Rapid Intervention” battalion in the National Guard, was attacked with gunfire and that the car of commander Farouk al-Naddaf was targeted with a Molotov cocktail.

===== May 2026 =====
On 2 May, the Jordanian Air Force led "Operation Jordanian Deterrence" in the Druze militia-controlled cities of Shahba, Al-Kafr, Arman and Al-Anat, to counter border drug trafficking. In Shahba, the Air Force bombed the former State Security branch. On the same day, the Syrian government also carried out operations against drug trafficking.

On 3 May, the National Guard leadership published a statement condemning the operation, saying that Jordan's failure to coordinate the raids with them caused civilians in the border villages to panic. It also claimed that some strikes were targeted at properties of civilians opposed to the government. On the same day, armed groups attacked internal security positions in Suwayda.

On 6 May, retired Jordanian military analyst, Major-General Abu Nowar told Al Jazeera English that the airstrikes were a deterrent to drug cartels, as well as a warning to external actors—such as Israel and Israel-allied elements in Suwayda—seeking to capitalize on the power struggle.

On 9 May, two inner faction of the National Guard, the Saraya al-Jabal faction and the Jala Abu Daqqa faction, clashed with each other.

===== June 2026 =====
On 6 June (with other developments also taking place in surrounding days), students trying to leave Suwaida Governorate towards Damascus for the holding of national exams were faced with a blockade by the National Guard on the Umm al-Zaytoun border checkpoint, with them and their families facing death threats if any of them managed to leave the governorate. This situation has faced a student boycott in Suwaida in response, pertaining to exams having to be held in Damascus as per the order of the Governor of Suwaida Governorate, while some have managed to reach Damascus.
