= Southern Tribes Gathering =

Militant organization in Syria

- تجمع عشائر الجنوب
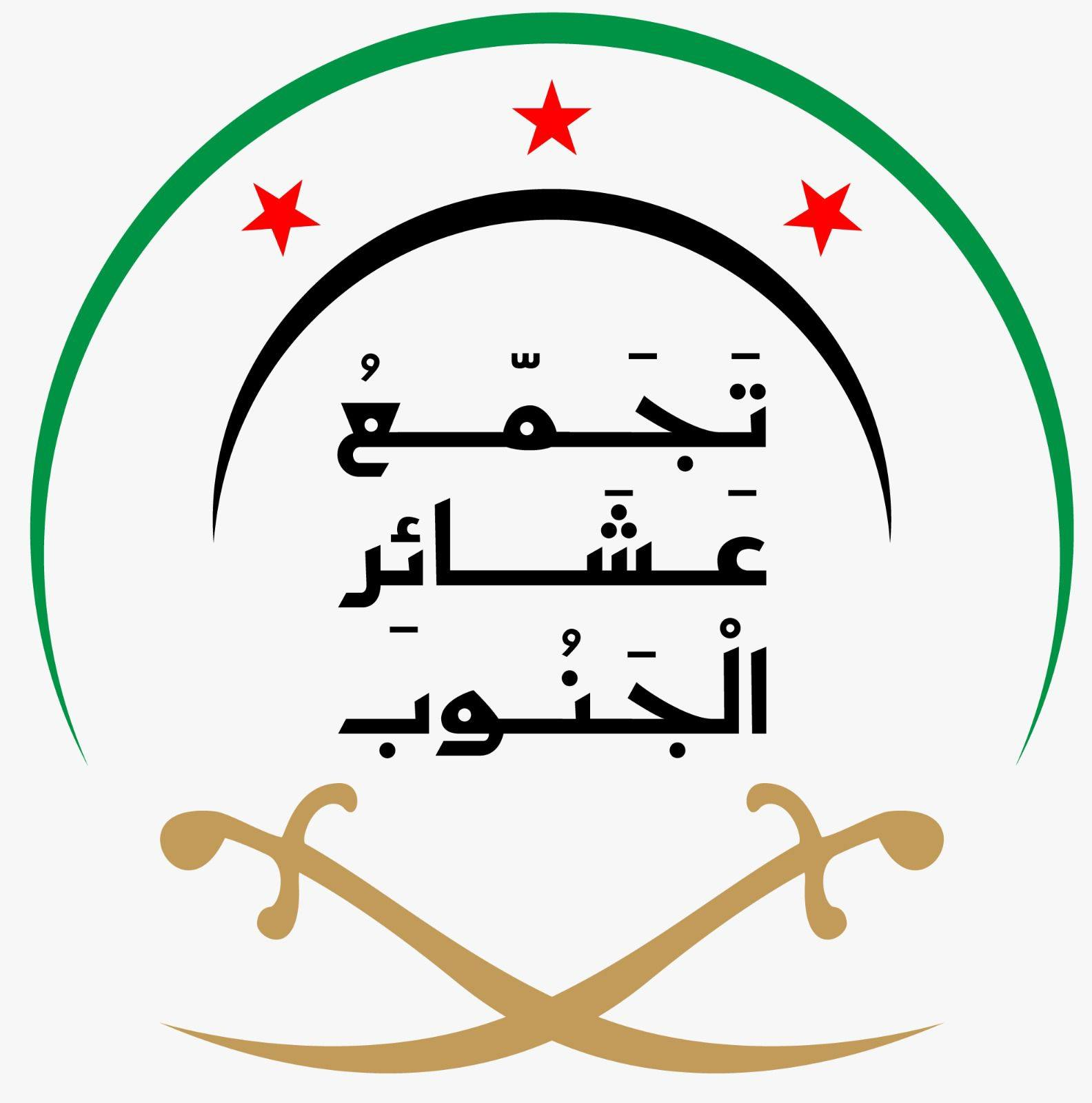
- Leader: Sheikh Rakan Al-Khudair
- Dates active: 2021-present
- Country: Syria
- Active regions: Suwayda Governorate
- Ideology: Tribalism
- Wars: Syrian civil war; Southern Syria protests (2023–24); Syrian conflict (2024–present); Druze insurgency in Southern Syria (2025–present); Southern Syria clashes (July 2025–present)

Southern Tribes Gathering (Arabic: تجمع عشائر الجنوب) is a militant organization in Suwayda Governorate formed by Syrian Bedouin tribal forces.

== History ==
The group issued a statement warning of the beginning of the formation of cells to attack civil peace and the need to act with caution during Southern Syria protests (2023–24).

After the fall of the Assad regime, they prepared to hand over their weapons to the Syrian transitional government.

They actively participated in the fight against Druze groups in Suwayda during clashes in southern Syria in July 2025, demanding the release of Bedouin detainees, then expressed their commitment to a ceasefire.

They declared themselves against the forced displacement in Suwayda.
