= 2023 Northeastern Syria clashes =

2023 Northeastern Syria clashes may refer to:

- March 2023 Northeastern Syria clashes
- June 2023 Northeastern Syria clashes
