= Southern Syria clashes (July–September 2025) =

- Part of the Aftermath of the Syrian civil war, Druze insurgency in Southern Syria and the Israeli invasion of Syria
- Military situation as of 19 February 2026 Syrian transitional government Druze factions Israeli occupation and invasion (Note: Israel occupied the Golan Heights after 1967, de facto annexing the region in 1981, but the territory is not recognized as part of Israel by the United Nations or any member states except Israel and the United States. Israel launched a new invasion of Syria on 8 December 2024 during the fall of Damascus, taking advantage of the power vacuum created by the fall of the Assad regime to increase the amount of territory it controlled by several hundred square miles.)
Date	13 July 2025 – September 2025 (1 year and 3 months)
Location	Suwayda, Daraa, and Rif Dimashq Governorates, southern Syria (Note: Israel conducted airstrikes in the governorates of Suwayda, Daraa, Damascus, Rif Dimashq and Latakia)
Status	Ceasefire: The Syrian Army is deployed to Suwayda from 14–16 July; withdrawn after ceasefire agreement; Israel conducts multiple airstrikes on Syria, including on Damascus; Massacres of local Druze by government forces; massacres of local Bedouins by Druze militants after government forces withdraw

Belligerents
Supreme Legal Committee in Suwayda; Anti-government Druze armed groups Israel	Syria (Note: Governed by the Syrian transitional government.); Pro-government Druze armed groups Bedouin tribes Islamic State

Commanders and leaders
Hikmat al-Hijri; Tareq al-Shoufi; Shakib Ajwad Nasr; Shadi Fayez Murshid; Jihad Ghoutani; Firas Hamayil †; Benjamin Netanyahu; Israel Katz	(Syria) Ahmed al-Sharaa (Syria) Murhaf Abu Qasra (Syria) Ali Noureddine al-Naasan (Syria) Anas Khattab (Syria) Ahmed al-Dalati; Suleiman Abdul Baqi; Abdul Moneim al-Naseef; Sheikh Rakan Al-Khudair (Islamic State) Abu Hudhayfah (Note: Per BBC Arabic.)

Units involved
Supreme Legal Committee in Suwayda; National Guard; Suwayda Military Council; Sheikh al-Karama Forces; Al-Jabal Brigade; Men of Dignity; Anti-Terrorism Force; Al-Fahd Forces; Jaysh al-Muwahhidin; Internal Security Forces; Israel Defense Forces; Israeli Air Force	Syrian Armed Forces; Syrian Army; 62nd Division; 72nd Division; 12th Brigade; 107th Brigade; Military Police; Ministry of Interior; General Security Service; Ahrar Jabal al-Arab; Guest House of Dignity; Syrian Council of Tribes and Clans; Southern Tribes Gathering; Anizah; Bani Khalid; Al-Bu Nasir; Mawali; Nu'aym; Shammar; Al-Uqaydat; Al-Busraya; Al-Shaitat; Tribes of Lajat; Military of the Islamic State

Casualties and losses
569 fighters killed (Israel) A number of Israeli Druze who crossed the ceasefire line fence were arrested in Daraa	(Syria) 451 soldiers and policemen killed (Note: 436 killed in fighting with Druze groups and 15 killed by Israeli strikes.) (Syria) Several tanks and drones damaged or destroyed 41 Bedouins killed (Note: Including one Lebanese citizen.)
- 167 civilians killed in the fighting (Note: 162 civilians in Suwayda, including 51 women and 21 children.; 3 civilians, including one woman, by Israeli strikes on Damascus.; 2 journalists in Suwayda.); 828 civilians killed in extrajudicial executions (Note: 823 (almost all Druze), including 79 women, 15 children, and 1 elderly man, executed by government forces according to the SOHR, one of the victims was a Syrian-American citizen, another was Syrian-French.; 5 Bedouins, including a woman and a child, executed by Druze groups according to the SOHR.); 192,000+ civilians displaced

On 13 July 2025, fighting began between Druze and Bedouin armed groups in the city of Suwayda and its surrounding villages in southern Syria. The Syrian transitional government deployed the Armed Forces to the area to restore order between 14 and 16 July. A ceasefire agreement was reached between Druze leaders and the government on 15 July, but one of the Druze leaders, Hikmat al-Hijri, (Note: Spiritual leadership of the Druze in Syria is split into two since the 2010s, one is headed by Hikmat al-Hijri, the other is mutually headed by Hammoud al-Hinnawi and Youssef Jarbou.) called for armed resistance against the government and Bedouin groups. The other two Druze leaders, Hammoud al-Hinnawi and Youssef Jarbou, initially cooperated with government calls for a ceasefire, but later issued statements expressing opposition to the government. Extrajudicial killings and abuse of both Druze and Bedouin civilians were reported as a result of the clashes.

Israel launched airstrikes targeting Syrian government forces and Bedouin fighters with the stated goal of defending the Druze. Israel had recently invaded deeper into southwestern Syria and had been demanding the Syrian military stay out of the region. Syria's foreign ministry accused Israel of inflaming sectarian tensions to undermine the new Syrian government. Another ceasefire agreement was reached on 16 July, and the Syrian Armed Forces sided with the Bedouins before withdrawing from Suwayda. Following the withdrawal, Druze groups reportedly committed massacres against local Bedouin tribes, leading to a mass exodus to the neighboring Daraa Governorate. Up to 50,000 Bedouins from 41 tribes reportedly mobilized to Suwayda in response to the reports. Rumours of another Bedouin attack on Suwayda prompted a mass exodus of Druze residents on 17 July. Reports of abuse of Druze civilians have since resumed. Various Druze from Israel stated that they would participate in the fighting if attacks continued. Government forces re-entered Suwayda on 19 July in response to growing violence between the two groups. The clashes are an escalation of the Druze insurgency in Southern Syria, which is considered a part of the aftermath of the Syrian civil war.

== Background ==
The Druze, who make up about three percent of Syria's population, have largely remained neutral during the country's civil war that began in 2011. Druze communities exist in Lebanon, and in Israel's Galilee and in the Israeli-occupied Syrian Golan Heights. Druze citizens of Israel are subject to conscription to the IDF. While most Druze in Israel identify as Israeli citizens, Druze living in the occupied Golan still identify as Syrians and have close ties to family in Syria.

Druze groups were involved in conflict earlier in the year, including clashes in February with the Syrian government in Jaramana, a Damascus suburb, and clashes in Southern Syria with Bedouin tribes that began in April and lasted until May.

The clashes occurred about seven months after the fall of the Assad regime in December 2024. Following this change in leadership, Syrian President Ahmed al-Sharaa vowed to protect minorities across the country.

Druze factions in Syria are divided in their approach to the new authorities, ranging from cautious to outright rejection. In March 2025, Bahaa al-Jamal, a Druze commander in Suwayda, stated that massacres of Syrian Alawites by pro-government Islamist fighters had led to insecurity for other minorities, but the Druze had significant military capabilities with "thousands of military personnel" and the right to defend themselves if confronted by government forces.

Israeli Prime Minister Benjamin Netanyahu expressed a commitment to prevent harm to the Druze in Syria due to Israel's historical commitment to its Druze citizens and their historical and family ties to the Druze in Syria, along with ensuring the demilitarization of the area near the border with Syria.

Different sources and scholars have taken different positions on the motives for Israel's intervention in Syria. One reason was the security of its northern border, due to concerns about a power vacuum in southern Syria, which is considered a potential threat, especially from the establishment of anti-Israeli militias on its northern border. Another reason was attributed to support for the establishment of a federal system in Syria. Another reason is pressure from the Israeli Druze population to protect their related Syrian Druze in the event of an attack.

Israel and Syria have engaged in secret back-channel talks. Israel was in the process of trying to reach an updated security agreement with Syria based on the 1974 Agreement on Disengagement between the two nations. Syria has said that the goal of negotiations was the reimplementation of the 1974 agreement.

== Timeline ==
=== July ===
==== 11 July ====
The violence was reportedly triggered by a robbery that happened on 11 July 2025 on the Damascus–Suwayda highway, in which a Druze vegetable merchant was assaulted by members of Bedouin tribes after they set up an improvised roadblock. The assailants stole his vehicle and belongings before forcibly taking him to a remote and rugged area. There, the group subjected him to sectarian insults and repeated death threats throughout his detention. He was later released blindfolded and in critical condition in a distant town. In response, local Druze armed groups detained several individuals from Bedouin tribes the next day in an effort to recover the stolen property. This initiated a cycle of retaliatory kidnappings between the two sides, which quickly escalated into open armed clashes.

==== 13 July ====
Bedouin fighters responded by establishing a checkpoint in the al-Maqwas neighborhood in eastern Suwayda city on 13 July, where they captured several members of the local Druze armed groups. Armed clashes soon erupted between the two sides in and around the area.

Violence soon spread beyond al-Maqwas to rural areas including at-Tira, al-Mazraa, and as-Sawra al-Kabira. Reports confirmed the use of mortars and other heavy weapons. The highway between Damascus and Suwayda was cut off by armed groups. Syrian government checkpoints came under attack by Bedouin fighters, leading to reported clashes between the assailants and government security forces in various parts of the region.

Reinforcements from Daraa Governorate arrived to the area to assist the Bedouin fighters.

Bedouin tribal fighters were reported to have advanced toward the outskirts of at-Tira village. Most residents of the village were displaced toward al-Mazraa and Suwayda amidst the violent clashes, during which several homes were set on fire.

Meanwhile, Syrian government forces from the Ministry of Interior were dispatched to contain the fighting.

On the evening of 13 July, the Ministry of Education postponed the high school final exams originally scheduled for 14 July to a later date due to escalating security tensions in the region.

==== 14 July ====
Several videos circulated on social media showed a vehicle belonging to the General Security Service, with an individual inside making sectarian remarks while declaring his involvement in the armed conflict in Suwayda. In response, the Security Forces Command in Daraa announced on 14 July the arrest of several security personnel who appeared in the video and said in a statement that the individuals acted independently and were not authorized to speak on matters related to civil peace. The officers involved were suspended from duty, and a formal investigation into the incident was launched.

On 14 July, the spiritual leadership of the Druze community in Syria headed by Hikmat al-Hijri issued a statement saying it is reaffirmed its previous demands, foremost among them an urgent call for international protection, citing the increasingly dangerous situation in Suwayda. The statement reiterated the leadership's rejection of any security forces entering their areas—specifically naming the General Security Service and another unnamed agency—accusing them of crossing into the province under the pretext of providing protection while allegedly shelling border villages and supporting extremist groups with heavy weaponry and drones. The spiritual leadership held all parties involved in attacks on local areas and civilians fully responsible, condemning any attempts to impose official security control over Suwayda as a direct threat to the safety of its residents. The statement concluded by emphasizing that international protection is an urgent necessity to prevent further bloodshed, calling on relevant international actors to intervene immediately.

The Syrian Ministry of Interior declared that its forces, in coordination with the Ministry of Defense, would begin a direct intervention in the region. The objective is to end the ongoing clashes, restore security, pursue those responsible for the violence, and bring them before the relevant judicial authorities. The ministry emphasized that this intervention aims to prevent further unrest and re-establish the rule of law in Suwayda. Several Syrian army personnel were killed and others injured while deployed to de-escalate clashes in Suwayda after coming under attack by armed groups. The Ministry of Interior later reported that several of its security personnel were "abducted" while carrying out a security deployment aimed at restoring order and containing the clashes in the al-Maqwas neighborhood.

Shelling was reported in the neighboring Daraa Governorate, in which four civilians were wounded by a Druze group from the town of Tha'la and among the villages controlled by Druze groups.

The Syrian Observatory for Human Rights said that it obtained multiple video and voice recordings from the clashes that it would refrain from publishing due to its highly sensitive nature. The recordings reportedly contain elements that could undermine Syria's national cohesion, inflame sectarian tensions, and further incite discord among citizens.

Israeli Air Force fighter jets were reported to have conducted low-altitude flights over the western countryside of Suwayda, deploying flares during their intensified aerial presence in the area. The Israeli Army later announced that it had struck multiple tanks belonging to the Syrian Army in Suwayda Governorate. However the tank was repaired and was deployed again in an hour. Israeli defense minister Israel Katz said the strike was "a message and a clear warning to the Syrian regime. We will not allow harm to the Druze in Syria". The Syrian Arab News Agency reported a total of three Israeli strikes.

==== 15 July ====
The Syrian Minister of Defence announced that a ceasefire had been reached with Druze spiritual leadership, including Hikmat al-Hijri, for state security forces to deploy in the region with the aim of stopping the ongoing violence. They urged all armed factions in the area to cooperate and surrender their weapons. However, later that day, Sheikh Hikmat al-Hijri released a video urging Druze fighters to "resist this brutal campaign by all available means", including women, children, and elderly fighting, accusing government forces of violating the ceasefire by shelling Suwayda city. The Syrian Observatory for Human Rights accused government and government-aligned forces of summary executions of 19 Druze civilians, including 12 in one house.

Protests erupted on several main roads in northern Israel as members of the Druze community demonstrated in solidarity with Druze in Syria. The protesters called for international intervention to safeguard Syria's Druze minority from "Islamist fighters loyal to the regime".

Israel conducted further strikes in al-Mazraa after the Syrian Armed Forces took control of the town. Strikes were also reported on the outskirts of Suwayda. Intensive airstrikes continued across Suwayda following the announcement of a ceasefire. The airstrikes targeted military equipment and convoys of the Syrian armed forces. The airstrikes targeted military convoys, one Syrian army convoy was struck in Suwayda resulting in at least one casualty.

At least two Israeli strikes were reported targeting locations near the 12th Brigade in the northeastern countryside of Izra in Daraa Governorate.

The Mar Mikhael Church in the town of as-Sawra al-Kabira was robbed, vandalized, and burned amid the chaos.

Dozens of Israeli Druze civilians were reported to have crossed the fence from the Israeli-occupied Golan Heights at Hader, near Majdal Shams, towards the Syrian side. The IDF said that its troops were "working to safely return the civilians who crossed the border".

Men of Dignity confirmed the casualties and injuries of more than 50 militants of their faction amidst clashes with the Syrian Armed Forces.

==== 16 July ====
The Syrian Observatory for Human Rights reported that the number of fatalities as a result of fighting, bombardment, and extrajudicial killings had risen to 248.

In the early hours of 16 July, the Israeli Air Force executed at least 7 airstrikes against multiple targets in Suwayda's countryside, including on the al-Tha'lah Military Airbase.

Sheikh Hikmat al-Hijri issued a statement, in which he appealed to U.S. President Donald Trump, Israeli Prime Minister Benjamin Netanyahu, Saudi Crown Prince Mohammed bin Salman, and Jordan's King Abdullah II to save Suwayda, stating that "the mask has fallen off the face of the ruling clique" and declaring, "we can no longer live with a regime that knows nothing of governance except iron and fire". He held the international community morally and ethically responsible and called on Sunni Syrians to take a clear stand regarding what is happening to their Syrian brethren.

The Syrian presidency issued a statement in which it condemned the recent violations in Suwayda Governorate, labeling the incidents as criminal and unacceptable under any circumstances. The statement emphasized that such actions contradict the core principles upon which the Syrian state is built and pledged full commitment to investigating all related incidents and holding those responsible accountable. The presidency stressed that individuals or groups involved—regardless of affiliation—would face legal consequences, asserting that no violations will go unpunished. Reaffirming the state's priority of ensuring national security and stability, the statement concluded with an assurance to the people of Suwayda that their rights will be safeguarded and that no party will be allowed to undermine their safety or stability.

Israel later renewed its bombing of the entrance of the Syrian General Staff complex in Damascus for a third time followed by another one directly on the main building. Israeli Defense Minister Israel Katz declared that the era of mere warnings in Damascus has ended, stating that "painful blows" will now be delivered to the Syrian government. Katz emphasized that the IDF will persistently and forcefully act in Suwayda to dismantle the forces responsible for attacking the Druze community until they fully withdraw. Addressing the Druze community in Israel, he reassured them that they can rely on the Israel Defense Forces for protection of their brethren in Syria, affirming that both he and Prime Minister Netanyahu have made a firm commitment to uphold this promise. The Israeli military announced an airstrike on the entrance to the Syrian General Staff complex in Damascus, noting that it "continues to monitor developments against Druze civilians in southern Syria and launches attacks based on political directives". Heavier strikes targeted the complex and caused vast damage and destruction to the main building, later strikes targeted the vicinity of the Presidential Palace in Damascus. The Syrian Ministry of Health reported three killed and 34 injured as a result of the attacks. Multiple additional Israeli strikes were reported in Daraa and Suwayda Governorates. Later in the day, seven Syrian Army soldiers were killed in two Israeli airstrikes in the vicinity of Suwayda. Renewed Israeli airstrikes were reported near Qatana in Rif Dimashq Governorate.

Syria's foreign ministry said that Israel's "flagrant assault, which forms part of a deliberate policy pursued by the Israeli entity to inflame tensions, spread chaos, and undermine security and stability in Syria, constitutes a blatant violation of the United Nations Charter and international humanitarian law".

The Druze Religious Authority in Suwayda (Note: Headed by sheikhs al-Hinnawi and Jarbou.) announced it had reached a comprehensive agreement with the Syrian government to fully integrate the province within the Syrian state and reaffirm the state's sovereignty over the region. The agreement stipulates the restoration and activation of all government institutions in Suwayda, ensuring that citizens' rights are upheld according to the principles of justice and equality. One of the key clauses includes the formation of a fact-finding and investigative committee tasked with probing recent violations and ensuring compensation and redress for those harmed. The statement also emphasized that the Damascus–Suwayda road and the safety of civilians along it fall under the state's responsibility. Additionally, the agreement provides for the withdrawal of army forces to their barracks, replacing them with internal security forces composed of trusted local officers, and outlines a plan to regulate heavy weapons in cooperation with the Ministries of Interior and Defense to eliminate non-state arms displays. The Syrian Ministry of Interior confirmed the ceasefire and the deployment of security checkpoints across the city as part of the reintegration process.

Sheikh Hikmat al-Hijri issued a statement in which he denied the existence of any agreement, negotiation, or mandate involving what he referred to as "armed gangs falsely calling themselves a government". Addressing the people and "our heroic youth defending land, honor, and religion", the statement praised what it described as the "spirit of heroism and dignity" and urged continued resistance against "criminal armed terrorist gangs" which he accused of committing murder, theft, looting, and burning of homes, hospitals, and places of worship. The statement stressed the importance of continuing "legitimate defense", calling for the fight to continue "until the full liberation of Suwayda Governorate from these gangs without condition", framing it as a national, humanitarian, and moral duty that allows no compromise. Al-Hijri also called on "the remaining" opposing armed individuals to surrender, promising that those who do will be under the protection of the spiritual leadership and "will not be humiliated or abused". Al-Hijri warned that "any individual or entity engaging in unilateral communication or agreement" with these "armed groups" would face legal and social accountability "without exception or leniency".

According to the White Helmets, the director of the Emergency Response Center in Suwayda was kidnapped by local militants while he was in Suwayda providing humanitarian aid. His fate remains unknown.

Demonstrations took place in the Druze-majority city of Jaramana in the Rif Dimashq Governorate, with protestors chanting slogans against president Ahmed al-Sharaa and his government.

In the evening of 16 July, the Syrian army began withdrawing from Suwayda. A statement by the Syrian Ministry of Defense said the withdrawal came after the army had completed operations against "outlaw groups" in the city. State news agency SANA reported the pullout was in line with the deal reached between the government and Druze religious leaders.

After repeated calls for Israel and the world to act and assist the Druze in Syria, who reported atrocities they had experienced, including abuse, humiliation and executions, Druze in Israel began trying to cross the border fence and reach their relatives on the Syrian side. It began with the crossing of dozens of Druze towards Syrian territory, and ended with the mass crossing of more than 1,000 people. At the same time, hundreds of Druze from Syria also crossed into Israeli territory in an attempt to escape the severe clashes.

The head of one of the Bedouin neighborhoods in the city of Sweida stated that the neighborhood was attacked by an armed group from Al-Ariqah town whose inhabitants are Druze and he added that the group killed 25 people and wounded others, he stated that he witnessed the killing of a woman and an infant and held the Syrian army responsible for what happened to them because the army withdrew from the city, which led to the Bedouins in the city and countryside being exposed to several attacks that led to the killing, wounding and kidnapping of hundreds of Bedouins.

==== 17 July ====
The Syrian Observatory for Human Rights reported that the total death toll, as a result of fighting since 13 July, had risen to 516. The Observatory also reported the displacement of Arab Bedouins in several areas within the Suwayda Governorate. In one instance, local factions gave members of Bedouin tribes until the afternoon to leave the al-Maqwas neighbourhood of Suwayda city.

The director of the Syrian Network for Human Rights told The New Arab newspaper that dozens of Bedouin tribesmen were killed in Suwayda Governorate by armed groups affiliated with Sheikh Hikmat al-Hijri and added that the number of total deaths from all sides could reach 250. A massacre of Bedouins was later reported in that neighbourhood by the Syrian state-run news agency SANA.

Syria TV channel reported testimonies from Bedouin women stating that Druze militias burned houses, killed young men, and forced women and children to leave. The women said they had not taken part in any fighting to deserve such treatment.

The Syrian Network for Human Rights reported that 169 people had been killed and over 200 injured between 13 and 17 July.

Following the withdrawal of the Syrian army, Druze fighters reportedly discovered entire houses had been set on fire, families slaughtered inside homes, and looting. Witnesses in Suwayda compared the Syrian government's actions to summary executions.

Israeli airstrikes on the headquarters of the 107th brigade in the southern countryside of Jableh in Latakia Governorate were reported early in the morning.

Clashes resumed in Suwayda after government forces withdrew as Bedouins launched new armed assaults on Druze forces, with the stated goal of releasing Bedouin prisoners of war. A Bedouin commander told Reuters that the ceasefire agreement did not bind his men, but only the forces of President Ahmed al-Shara's administration. According to the commander, his forces are aiming to free the Bedouins who were detained in recent days by the Druze fighters.

Clashes between Bedouin and Druze fighters were also reported in the western countryside of Rif Dimashq Governorate.

The Syrian presidency accused Druze factions of breaking the ceasefire agreement by their involvement in "horrific" violence against civilians. Syrian state media reported Israeli airstrikes near Suwayda, which were the first reported strikes after the ceasefire agreement.

Al Jazeera Arabic reported that gunmen were holding 1,000 civilians from the Suwayda tribes in the town of Shahba, controlled by the Suwayda Military Council. Al Jazeera reported that more than 500 families from the tribes were displaced after their homes were burned. Eyewitnesses told Enab Baladi that Druze factions ordered Bedouins to leave their villages and in one instance fired upon those leaving, killing 20 people.

A Bedouin displaced from Shahba with his family, told Reuters he saw 6 bodies in one home there, and the town had been hit with weapons including mortars.

The Democratic Autonomous Administration of North and East Syria (DAANES) announced the dispatch of emergency humanitarian aid to Suwayda, in response to worsening living conditions and service disruptions.

Two Israeli Druze coming back from Syria to Israel were reportedly arrested after trying to smuggle a Kalashnikov rifle and magazine back into Israel.

==== 18 July ====
Amid the large-scale attack by Bedouin fighters on Suwayda Governorate and reports of them entering Suwayda city, backed by fighters from the neighboring Daraa Governorate and other governorates in Syria, Hikmat al-Hijri reportedly demanded the Syrian government to send a conflict resolution force.

Reports later circulated that Syrian government forces were preparing to redeploy in the city of Suwayda, following renewed clashes between Druze factions and Bedouin tribes. While an Israeli government related source said that Israel had agreed to a time-limited entry into Suwayda by Syrian government forces, the Syrian Interior Ministry denied that it was preparing to re-enter the city.

The Israeli Foreign Ministry ordered the transfer of 2 million shekels worth of humanitarian aid to Druze in Syria.

The Office of the United Nations High Commissioner for Human Rights' spokesperson highlighted reports of widespread violations and abuses, including summary and extrajudicial killings, kidnappings, destruction of private property, and looting, by individuals affiliated with the Syrian government, including members of security forces, as well as by Druze and Bedouin fighters, noting that local hospitals were struggling to cope with the scale of injured.

The Syrian Observatory for Human Rights reported the arrival of Bedouin reinforcements and the opening of a new front in Teloul Al-Safa in south-east Syria. The tribal forces also advanced in Al-Omran west of Suwayda. Clashes were reported in Jaramana as well as in al-Maliha and Kashkoul which lasted for an hour.

Sheikh Hikmat al-Hijri reiterated his demand for direct international protection for the Druze, claiming that the Bedouins in Syria had violated the agreement. He claimed that the countries that guaranteed the ceasefire agreement must bear responsibility for it in order for it to be implemented.

The Syrian government announced that it would deploy a "specialized force" to bring an end to the clashes and resolve the conflict, with the presidency accusing groups operating outside of the law of endangering civilians.

The Taakkad platform for verification published images showing a member of militias affiliated with Hikmat al-Hijri filming himself with two corpses that had been hung at the entrance gate of the village of al-Junaynah.

==== 19 July ====
The Syrian government declared a ceasefire with approval from both the Druze leadership and Bedouin tribes.

The Egyptian Al-Qaira channel reported that the exchange of fire in the Suwayda Governorate has not yet ended, and that Bedouin militants have refused to withdraw from the Druze mountain "as long as the Syrian state does not yet hold the reins of power".

Syrian government forces were deployed in the city of Suwayda and had difficulty implementing a ceasefire.

Fierce street fighting was documented in the city of Suwayda between Bedouins and Druze. AFP, which had teams on the ground, reported that the Bedouin militants had managed to break through the Druze defenses and penetrate the west of the city. An AFP correspondent in Suwayda reported seeing dozens of houses and cars set on fire, and gunmen setting shops on fire after looting them.

Jordan increased its presence along its border with Syria and prevented its Bedouin population from crossing the border. At the same time, Jordan did not respond to calls from Druze in Israel and Syria to open a humanitarian corridor on its border with Syria on the grounds of unwillingness to cooperate with unofficial elements in Syria, according to a senior Jordanian official.

The Syrian Observatory for Human Rights (SOHR) said that tribal fighters withdrew from Suwayda city after Druze fighters launched a large-scale attack.

Syrian Interior Ministry spokesman announced that evening after the deployment of security forces in the northern and western areas of Suwayda Governorate, the city of Suwayda was evacuated of all Bedouin tribal fighters and clashes within the city's neighborhoods ceased.

Various Druze from Israel stated their intention of crossing the border to participate if the fighting continued.

The UN estimated more than 87,000 people have been displaced in Suwayda Governorate since 12 July due the clashes.

==== 20 July ====
Hikmat al-Hijri refused the entry of a government delegation with aid into Suwayda.

The Syrian Observatory for Human Rights said there were renewed clashes in al-Ariqah, Rimat Hazem, and Shahba after an attack by tribal forces amidst the ceasefire agreement.

The Syrian Observatory for Human Rights reported Israeli fighter jets were seen in the airspace of al-Ariqah in Suwayda Governorate, Nawa in northwestern Daraa Governorate, and Khan Arnabah village in Quneitra Governorate. Thermal balloons were launched onto Suwayda during the airspace violations.

A prisoner exchange in the Umm al-Zaytoun town failed after a shelling from northern Suwayda, according to the Syrian Observatory for Human Rights.

The Syrian Observatory for Human Rights reported new clashes in al-Ariqah after tribal forces facilitated their presence in the town despite the presence of the Syrian internal security forces, which raised accusations towards the security forces of aiding the entrance of tribal fighters into al-Ariqah.

==== 21 July ====
The Syrian government began bringing buses to help evacuate roughly 1,500 Bedouins trapped in Suwayda as fighting had mostly stopped.

The Syrian Observatory for Human Rights said that nine civilians were injured by a drone attack on the city of Shahba by Bedouin tribes.

Ceasefire violations were reported by the Syrian Observatory for Human Rights after Syrian government reinforcements arrived in northwestern Suwayda governorate. The SOHR said that clashes using kamikaze drones and heavy machine guns broke out in Umm al-Zaytoun and several areas of Suwayda countryside. A drone targeting the Druze populated areas was reportedly shot down, indicating several violations of the ceasefire.

==== 22 July ====
The Syrian Interior Ministry spokesperson stated that the situation in Suwayda has been improving, though the full restoration of state institutions and their operations will require more time. He emphasized that a humanitarian approach is now prevailing, with aid deliveries underway, the release of hostages and detainees held by armed groups, as well as efforts to exchange and bury the dead — all of which he described as highly significant steps. A security source stated that the ceasefire agreement in Suwayda is being implemented across "most" areas of the governorate, with no violations reported so far. Added that the next step will be establishing a broader truce aimed at restoring stability throughout the region, alongside efforts to carry out detainee exchanges between the two sides.

Buses continued evacuating Bedouin families from Suwayda, they were reportedly accompanied by a delegation from the United Nations.

==== 23 July ====
The Syrian Observatory for Human Rights reported that calm has prevailed across the various frontlines since 21 July, with only limited violations reported following the agreement that included a ceasefire.

Al Mashhad channel reported a statement from the leader of the Jubur tribe, in which he said that the al-Hijri militias executed 40 men as if they were a delegation he had presented to the city of Suwayda in order to agree to stop the clashes.

==== 25 July ====
The Syrian Observatory for Human Rights reported ceasefire violations in Umm al-Zaytoun village and the Mujadal road where heavy machinegun fire was reported. Shelling was also reported in the areas of Reema Hazem and in Walgha in western Suwayda. Tensions persisted in the Kanaker region with the presence of tribal gunmen. No casualties were reported.

==== 26 July ====
The spiritual leadership of the Druze, headed by Sheikh Hikmat al-Hijri, announced the formation of a "Supreme Legal Committee" consisting of six judges, including four judicial advisors, and three lawyers. The committee outlined its responsibilities as managing public affairs across all sectors in Suwayda, including administrative, security, and service-related matters.

==== 30 July ====
The Jordanian Ministry of Foreign Affairs announced that 112 Jordanian citizens, along with nationals of friendly countries, were evacuated from Suwayda Governorate in coordination with Syrian authorities. The evacuation took place via the Nasib–Jaber border crossing, using buses provided by the Syrian Arab Red Crescent, following requests from the individuals' home countries.

==== 31 July ====
The Syrian Ministry of Justice announced the formation of a committee to investigate the events and violations in Suwayda.

=== August ===
==== 2 August ====
The first meeting of the government committee established to investigate the violent events in Suwayda was held. The meeting was headed by Syrian Justice Minister Mazhar al-Wais.

==== 3 August ====
Syrian state TV channel, Al-Ikhbariyah, reported that what it called "outlaw groups" violated the ceasefire agreement and attacked Syrian Internal Security Forces in Suwayda and shelled several villages in the governorate's countryside. One member of the Internal Security Forces was reported killed and several injured. Fighting centered around the strategic Tal al-Hadid, which overlooks the city of Suwayda. The fighting began after local factions took control of Tal al-Hadid and Tel al-Aqra. Al-Jabal Brigade was also involved in the fighting. Government and allied forces launched a counter-attack, capturing nearly 30 Druze fighters. SANA reported that the government was able to recapture all positions previously lost that day and that it was still committed to the ceasefire.

==== 8 August ====
A convoy belonging to the Syrian Arab Red Crescent, operating as part of the humanitarian response in Suwayda, was subjected to direct gunfire, but no injuries were reported. The organization stated in a press release that the damage was limited to material losses, with no human casualties, and confirmed that the convoy continued its mission to deliver aid to the most vulnerable groups.

Clashes erupted in the town of Najran between Druze factions and an armed group, following an attack reportedly launched by the latter. The Syrian Observatory for Human Rights reported that the clashes resulted in the deaths of two people on both sides, along with material damage and the burning of several civilian homes, before the attackers withdrew.

==== 9 August ====
In a recorded statement, Sheikh Hammoud al-Hinnawi expressed sharp criticism against the Syrian government—the first such stance since the fall of the Assad regime. In the recorded statement, which was the first since the beginning of the clashes, he condemned the authorities for betraying the nation and violating their commitments, describing the government as treacherous and oppressive toward innocent people. He called on international bodies and humanitarian organizations to urgently lift the siege on Suwayda, allow unrestricted humanitarian access, and investigate those responsible for brutal crimes against the Druze community. Al-Hinnawi stressed that the conflict has become a fight for survival, not just political maneuvering. He concluded by thanking the Druze spiritual leader in Israel, Sheikh Muwaffaq Tarif, for his support.

In a separate recorded statement, Sheikh Hikmat al-Hijri accused the Syrian government of carrying out a "systematic genocide" against the governorate's residents. He called for urgent international intervention and United Nations investigations. Al-Hijri characterized the situation as a "silent extermination plan" orchestrated from "dark rooms" and criticized what he called "media falsification campaigns" by state-run outlets. He said Suwayda "will not ask for sympathy" but "will not remain silent in the face of massacres". He expressed gratitude to U.S. President Donald Trump for "his clear stance in supporting minorities and rejecting tyranny", and to "the government and people of Israel for their humanitarian intervention", and to Gulf states and the Autonomous Administration in the North and East of the Euphrates for "their support to the people of Suwayda". The statement also emphasized the need for all armed groups to withdraw beyond Suwayda's administrative borders.

Al-Hijri's statement included the following demands:

- Opening an independent international investigation into the crimes committed in Suwayda.
- Referring those involved in these crimes to the International Criminal Court.
- Sending international monitoring missions to protect civilians.
- Ceasing all forms of political and military support for the "terrorist" factions surrounding Suwayda.

Al-Hijri called on the guarantor states to pressure the Syrian government to abide by the ceasefire agreement and not repeat the violations and attacks that occurred during its implementation.

In a third, separate recorded statement, Sheikh Youssef Jarbou described the events in the governorate as a "great ordeal", saying that he and local figures had sought to stop the bloodshed and protect civilians. According to Jarbou, the latest offensive, carried out under the pretext of "establishing state authority", in fact provided cover for what he referred to as a "Tatar army" (Note: "Tatar" is used metaphorically to describe ruthless, merciless fighters.) that killed unarmed civilians and carried out theft, burning, and destruction under the justification of targeting "outlaw groups". He stated that the attacking forces committed "sectarian atrocities" amounting to systematic ethnic cleansing, and said these actions were a betrayal of the governorate's humanitarian and historical role in sheltering displaced people from across Syria during the uprising against the former regime. Jarbou called on guarantor states to act to end the situation, and urged humanitarian and media organizations to document what he described as "massacres committed against humanity" in Suwayda. He stated that the Druze community "has never been an aggressor but advocates of peace and unity", while warning against any infringement on their dignity, adding that "behind peace lies courage, and behind gentleness lies firmness and strength". He expressed support for the Druze Sheikhs' call for unity, thanked those he said had stood with Suwayda, particularly Sheikh Muwaffaq Tarif, and called for an end to fighting, a withdrawal from the governorate, the release of abducted and missing persons, the formation of an international investigation, and the lifting of the siege with the opening of humanitarian corridors.

==== 10 August ====
The town of al-Majdal came under an assault from three directions, involving the use of heavy machine guns and mortar fire. One wave of the attack originated from the town of al-Mazraa, where government forces are stationed, while the other two approached from positions west of al-Majdal, firing heavy and medium machine guns toward the surrounding villages.

The United Nations Security Council issued a statement condemning violence in Suwayda, and urged all parties to uphold the ceasefire, protect civilians, and respect humanitarian and medical workers. The council called for "full, safe, rapid and unhindered humanitarian access" and the protection of all Syrians regardless of ethnicity or religion. While welcoming the Syrian authorities' condemnation of the violence and pledge to investigate, the council pressed for credible and transparent inquiries in line with international standards. It reaffirmed its commitment to Syria's sovereignty and territorial integrity, urged an end to destabilizing foreign interference, and reminded parties of the 1974 Disengagement Agreement governing the Golan Heights. The Council also urged Syria to take decisive measures against the Islamic State (IS) and Al-Qaeda, urging decisive action, and reiterated support for an inclusive, Syrian-led political process under resolution 2254.

==== 12 August ====
The Syrian Ministry of Foreign Affairs and Expatriates announced the formation of a trilateral working group with Jordan and the United States to support efforts to uphold the ceasefire and resolve the crisis in Suwayda. The initiative was announced after a meeting between Syrian Foreign Minister Asaad al-Shaibani, Jordanian Foreign Minister Ayman Safadi, and U.S. Special Envoy to Syria Tom Barrack in Amman, Jordan. According to a joint statement, the United States welcomed Syrian government commitments to conduct full investigations into crimes and violations in Suwayda, cooperate with relevant UN bodies, expand humanitarian aid delivery, restore disrupted services, rehabilitate damaged areas, facilitate the return of displaced residents, and promote local reconciliation. The statement emphasized Suwayda's integral place within Syria and the need to guarantee the rights and representation of its inhabitants. The statement said that the meeting came as a continuation to earlier talks in Amman on 19 July, which resulted in a ceasefire agreement.

Axios, citing U.S. and Israeli officials, reported that the United States was mediating discussions between Israel and Syria to establish a humanitarian corridor to Suwayda. The proposed corridor reportedly aimed to facilitate aid delivery to the local population, though the Syrian government expressed concerns that Druze armed groups might exploit it to smuggle weapons. Weeks earlier, an Israeli attempt to send aid via Jordan was blocked by the Jordanian government, prompting the Israeli military to conduct airdrops of humanitarian supplies.

==== 15 August ====
One woman from Suwayda was killed when unidentified armed assailants opened fire on the vehicle she was traveling in near the town of al-Kiheel in the eastern countryside of Daraa Governorate. She was en route with other passengers from Suwayda to Beirut via the highway passing through Daraa toward Damascus. The area where the incident took place was under the control of the Syrian government.

==== 16 August ====
Protests took place in Suwayda and nearby towns where thousands of people demanded a right to self-determination for the Druze minority and called for the intervention of Israel; many waved Israeli flags. Syrian state media reported that a group of followers of Sheikh Hikmat al-Hijri stormed the sites of the other Druze religious spiritual leadership. During the incident, members of the group reportedly assaulted Sheikh Youssef Jarbou and Sheikh Hammoud al-Hinnawi, while displaying al-Hijri's images alongside the Israeli flag at the sites.

==== 23 August ====
A number of armed groups in Suwayda issued statements declaring their merger under the umbrella of a "National Guard". According to their founding declaration, the move was intended to create "an organized and solid force entrusted with protecting the mountain and its people". The groups emphasized their "absolute commitment to the decisions of the spiritual leadership represented by Sheikh Hikmat al-Hijri", describing him as the legitimate representative of the Druze community in the mountain, referring to Jabal al-Druze.

In Suwayda, protesters called for the release of abductees, the opening of humanitarian corridors to allow aid delivery, urged the UN to intervene and establish civilian protection, and demanded the creation of an independent international commission of inquiry.

==== 25 August ====
The Men of Dignity joined the Druze-led National Guard.

==== 27 August ====
Residents from al-Mazraa protested in Suwayda, joined by some locals of the city, demanding complete independence and a return to their homes. They denounced the presence of Suwayda Governor Mustafa al-Bakour and Internal Security Chief Ahmad al-Dalati in al-Mazraa, holding them responsible for the killings that took place in the area and calling for both to be prosecuted. They also rejected the portrayal of Laith al-Balous as a representative of Suwayda, stressing that he "does not speak for them" and accusing him of facilitating the entry of government forces into al-Mazraa in coordination with the Ministries of Interior and Defense.

=== September ===
==== 2 September ====
The Syrian Observatory for Human Rights reported that Firas Hamayel, a commander in the National Guard, was killed in an ambush in Suwayda.

== De-escalation efforts ==
Suwayda governor Moustafa al-Bakkour immediately called for calm, warning against sectarian strife and urging restraint. Al-Bakkour reaffirmed the state's commitment to protecting civilians and praised local efforts for conflict resolution. While Brigadier General Nizar al-Hariri, deputy chief of the Internal Security Service, linked the escalation to the fallout from the highway robbery and subsequent abductions. He stated that local and security efforts were underway to de-escalate the violence.

Sheikh Hammoud al-Hinnawi, one of the Druze religious leaders in Syria, issued a public appeal on 13 July calling for calm and the avoidance of further violence, he urged all parties to reject sectarian strife, cease retaliatory actions, and uphold the rule of law. Al-Hinnawi addressed his message directly to President Ahmed al-Sharaa, tribal leaders, and all individuals of conscience, urging them to take active steps to prevent further bloodshed. He affirmed that the Druze community seeks justice and stability, stating that "dignity is preserved through reason and wisdom, not through weapons and abductions".

Lebanese Druze leader Walid Jumblatt voiced his support for a political resolution to the crisis in Suwayda, emphasizing that such a solution should take place under the framework of the Syrian government. He rejected any external intervention under the pretext of protecting the Druze community, stating, "We hope that security will be restored through a political solution". He further called upon the Druze factions in Syria to seek integration with the government amidst continued conflict.

The United States negotiated with Israel to halt its airstrikes against Syria as an step towards de-escalation between the two nations.

On 15 August, Suwayda governor Moustafa al-Bakkour called for reconciliation among local tribes and residents, urging the use of reason to maintain civil peace. In a statement, al-Bakkour emphasized that fostering values of cooperation and brotherhood is essential to preserving the social fabric, praising community leaders for bridging differences and prioritizing the public interest over narrow disputes. He stressed that civil peace is not merely a choice but a fundamental foundation for any development or reform initiatives.

=== Ceasefires ===
Syrian minister of defense Murhaf Abu Qasra announced a ceasefire effective from 15 July after an agreement with the Druze leaders in Suwayda. The Syrian Ministry of Interior warned against any damage to private or public property in Suwayda. According to the ceasefire agreement, it was not a complete withdrawal of the administration, and it would be able to continue to maintain police forces in the district, which would operate together with local Druze, but it was required, as stated, to withdraw the military forces it had sent there in the battles in recent days. A mechanism was also agreed upon to regulate the issue of possession of heavy weapons in the area. The agreement also stipulates the establishment of an investigative committee that will examine atrocities committed by militants and regime members against the Druze, according to reports.

Following the second ceasefire announced on 16 July, Syrian president Ahmed al-Sharaa addressed the nation stating that the government's priority is to protect Druze citizens as Israel continues its assaults on Syria. He further said "we reject any attempt to drag you into hands of an external party. We are not among those who fear the war. We have spent our lives facing challenges and defending our people, but we have put the interests of the Syrians before chaos and destruction". He criticised Israel for its attacks on government and civilians and expressed gratitude for American, Arab, and Turkish mediators for de-escalating the conflict and said that "the Israeli entity resorted to a wide-scale targeting of civilian and government facilities", adding that it led to a "significant complication of the situation and pushed matters to a large-scale escalation".

On 16 July, US Secretary of State Marco Rubio stated that the United States was making progress for a ceasefire agreement including Israel, saying "We hope to see some real progress to end what you've been seeing over the last couple of hours", as he addressed reporters at the Oval Office.

According to a Turkish security source, Turkish intelligence officers held talks with Syrian Druze leaders for securing the ceasefire. İbrahim Kalın, the director of the Turkish National Intelligence Organization, also held discussions with his Israeli, American and Syrian counterparts, as well as Ahmed al-Sharaa.

A joint "Gulf-Arab-Turkish" statement reaffirmed their support for Syrian integrity and "welcomed" al-Sharaa's commitment to hold to account fighters who took part in "abuses".

According to the spiritual leadership of the Druze in Syria, the agreement signed for a ceasefire from 19 July included a number of key steps intended to bring about calm and an end to the conflicts in the area. As part of the agreement, checkpoints of the General Security Forces will be deployed outside the administrative borders of the district, in order to prevent the infiltration of armed groups and stop the conflicts. Entry to villages on the border will be prohibited for 48 hours, to allow the deployment of forces and prevent surprise attacks. Bedouin tribesmen who remain within the district will be allowed to leave under secure escort and without interference, while humanitarian crossings will be opened in emergencies through Busra al-Harir and Busra al-Sham. The spiritual leadership called on all local groups not to leave the district's borders and to refrain from provocations, and made it clear that any party that violates the agreement will be held responsible for the collapse of the understandings. A call was also made to the residents of the governorate to act responsibly and in coordination in order to bring an end to the crisis that has affected them.

== War crimes ==
According to the Syrian Observatory for Human Rights, as of 8 August 401 Druze civilians, including 26 women, 14 children, and 1 elderly man, have been executed by members of the Syrian Ministries of Defense and Interior. While three Bedouin tribesmen, including a woman and a child, were executed by Druze gunmen.

=== Suwayda hospital mass shootings ===
BBC Arabic visited the Suwayda National Hospital, where staff claimed patients were killed inside wards by Syrian government forces. One person from the staff said they shot the patients in their beds as they slept. Security camera footage at the main hospital in Suwayda showed armed men in military uniforms, some belonging to the Ministry of Interior and others to the General Security Service. According to the footage, men in military uniforms shot to death one of the volunteers at the site following a fight. According to one activist, more than 100 bodies were found. The Syrian Ministry of Interior said it had launched an investigation following the release of the footage.

On 11 August, CCTV footage circulated on social media showing Syrian forces gather 30 staff members of the national hospital who were made to sit on the floor. The Syrian forces interrogated the staff members, reportedly asking their religion. Abu Hassas responded by stating that he is Druze. The soldiers, reportedly from the 82nd division of the Syrian army led by Khaled Muhammad Halabi (Abu Khattab), hit Abu Hassas' head with a Kalashnikov rifle and later shot him; some of them were seen wearing Islamic State badges.

Amnesty International confirmed that the massacre was committed by the Syrian government and affiliated forces.

=== Attacks on civilians ===
Residents and local journalists reported that Syrian government forces, who were identifiable by their clothes, were responsible for looting, physical abuse, and killings of Druze civilians while deployed in the region. Some fighters posted videos of themselves online humiliating Druze men in Suwayda, including cutting or shaving off the moustaches of Druze sheikhs. The moustaches are a symbol of Druze religious identity.

A resident of Buraykah who spoke to Enab Baladi claimed that Druze factions ordered the inhabitants of the village to leave and subsequently fired upon those who did, killing 20 people. On 17 July, Druze factions reportedly raided Buraykah, Shahba and Rimat al-Lahf, committing arson and breaking into homes. Syrian newspaper Zaman al-Wasl published a testimony from Suwayda, in which the person said that he saw the bodies of women and children from the Bedouins in the streets, and the smell of urine was widespread. He mentioned that he saw the bodies of Bedouin fighters mutilated, burned, and beheaded, as well as sectarian phrases written on the walls.

Media outlets reported that after the withdrawal of the Syrian Armed Forces, local Druze factions organised retaliatory attacks on the local Bedouin tribes. About 50 Bedouins were killed in the attacks and more than 1,000 were held captive.

An AFP correspondent in Suwayda reported seeing dozens of houses and cars set on fire, and Bedouin gunmen setting shops on fire after looting them.

Pastor Khaled Mezher of the Good Shepherd Evangelical Church in Suwayda was killed along with his family by Bedouin forces which claimed the lives of 20 people.

The Capuchin Church in Suwayda sheltering 250 people was reportedly shelled during the clashes, causing significant damage to the infrastructure of the church.

On 15 July, the Greek Melkite Church of St. Michael was set on fire by unknown assailants.

According to pontifical charity Aid to the Church in Need, at least 38 Christian families had their houses burned down during the period of violence, leaving up to 70 people homeless.

Al Jazeera English reported on 17 November 2025 that several security and military personnel who had taken part in the events had been arrested by the government.

=== Abduction or disappearance of women and children ===
The Syrian Observatory for Human Rights reported that 560 people, including women and children, went missing during clashes in Suwayda. The UN reported that 105 Druze women and girls were abducted by groups affiliated with the Syrian government, with 80 of them still missing as of 21 August; in at least three cases, Druze women were raped before being murdered.

=== Involvement of the Islamic State ===
The Islamic State (IS) attempted to encourage assaults on Druze populations by their supporters amidst the conflict in Suwayda by announcing Druze people as infidels during the conflict. Theological debate took place among its supporters on the issue of offering support for the Sunni Bedouin tribes against the Druze, while some argued in support of the intervention against Druze, whereas others suggested the Bedouin tribes to be unfit with their ideology, making it impermissible to fight along the Bedouins. An IS militant was reported to have set fire to a large building in an agricultural farm in the countryside of Suwayda. BBC Arabic later found evidence indicating that at least one contingent of IS troops under a man called Abu Hudhayfah were allied with Bedouin militias, fighting on their side in Suwayda.

Adel al-Hadi, an independent lawyer and activist, accused the Syrian government of collaboration with the Islamic State. He claimed that a large number of IS militants assaulted Druze populations in Suwayda.

== Reactions ==
=== Local ===
- Syria: Syria condemned the Israeli strikes on Syria and asserted their right to self-defense. The foreign ministry said that Israel's "flagrant assault, which forms part of a deliberate policy pursued by the Israeli entity to inflame tensions, spread chaos, and undermine security and stability in Syria, constitutes a blatant violation of the United Nations Charter and international humanitarian law".
- (Democratic Autonomous Administration of North and East Syria) Rojava/DAANES: The SDF condemned the violence in Suwayda, commenting on the civilian casualties in the conflict. The Kurdish women-led YPJ in particular expressed its readiness to "protect Druze women and civilians, [and to] shoulder all the responsibility placed upon us without hesitation". On 17 July 2025 the Social Affairs and Labor Authority of the DAANES dispatched humanitarian aid to Suwayda Governorate.

=== International ===
==== International organizations ====
- United Nations: The UN urged de-escalation between the belligerents and urged measures to protect civilians.
- European Union: The EU urged de-escalation and the implementation of the ceasefire declared on 15 July. It expressed its concern over civilian security as well as calls for the respect of Syria's sovereignty and integrity.
- Arab League: The General Secretariat of the Arab League strongly condemned the Israeli airstrikes on Syria, describing them as a blatant violation of the sovereignty of a fellow Arab League and UN member state and a clear breach of international law. The League characterized the attacks as acts of "bullying" that must not be tolerated by the regional or international community and called for their immediate cessation. It warned that the strikes aimed to sow chaos in Syria by exploiting recent unrest in Suwayda—events which the Syrian government itself denounced and pledged to investigate. The League expressed full solidarity with Syria, urging the government to defuse tensions through dialogue and inclusive national reconciliation.
- Gulf Cooperation Council: The council strongly condemned Israeli attacks on Syria.
- The Muslim World League issued a statement expressing its full solidarity with Syria against any threats to its security, stability, and sovereignty, particularly attempts to sow discord among its communities or interfere in its internal affairs. The League voiced support for the Syrian government's efforts to protect all segments of the population, uphold civil peace, and enforce the rule of law. It also condemned Israel's attacks on Syrian territory and its "continued violations of international laws and norms".

==== State actors ====
- Algeria: The Ministry of Foreign Affairs strongly condemned the Israeli attack on Syria, describing it as a blatant violation of Syrian sovereignty, territorial integrity, and national unity. The Ministry expressed full solidarity with Syria and affirmed its legitimate right to safeguard its security and stability in accordance with the principles of the UN Charter and international law.
- Bahrain: Bahrain welcomed the Syrian government's announcement of a ceasefire in Suwayda Governorate, stating that the move contributes to enhancing security, stability, and preserving civil peace. Bahrain affirmed its position in supporting Syria's security and stability, safeguarding its sovereignty, territorial integrity, and unity, as well as meeting the aspirations of its people for peace and sustainable development.
- China: China emphasized the importance of respecting Syria's sovereignty and territorial integrity in response to recent Israeli airstrikes. Foreign Ministry spokesperson Lin Jian warned against actions that could escalate tensions amid ongoing instability in the Middle East.
- Egypt: Egypt condemned the repetitive attacks on Syria as a "violation" of the sovereignty of the country and a "breach of international law".
- France: France called for an end to "abuses targeting civilians", and added that "the abuses targeting civilians, which we strongly condemn, must stop", the foreign ministry said, calling for an "immediate cessation of clashes".
- Germany: Germany threatened to halt its support for the Syrian government if it fails to prevent religious or ethnic persecution on its territory. Foreign Minister Johann Wadephul stated that Berlin would only support Damascus if it commits to an inclusive political process and protects its population. He emphasized that the Syrian government must not allow killings or discrimination based on religion or ethnicity, stressing that it is the central government's responsibility to ensure the safety of all citizens.
- Iran: The Foreign Ministry expressed strong condemnation of the attacks by Israel on Syria and made concerns on the clashes in Suwayda.
- Iraq: The Ministry of Foreign Affairs expressed deep concern over the escalating tensions in Syria and strongly condemned the repeated military interventions carried out by Israel, describing them as blatant violations of Syrian sovereignty and a threat to regional stability. It reaffirmed Iraq's full support for any regional or international efforts aimed at restoring peace and stability in Syria and reiterated its firm stance in support of Syria's unity and territorial integrity, rejecting any violation that undermines its sovereignty or endangers the safety of its people.
- Israel: Prime Minister Benjamin Netanyahu strongly asserted Israel's support to the Druze factions and ordered strikes on Syria, further stating that Israel was committed to the demilitarisation policy regarding southern Syria.
- Japan: Japan called for the respect of Syria's sovereignty and integrity and the preservation of the ceasefire with priority to civilian lives.
- Jordan: Jordan welcomed Syria's announcement of a ceasefire in Suwayda, stressing the need for calm, protection of civilians, law enforcement, and respect for Syrian sovereignty. Jordan affirmed its full support for Syria's efforts to rebuild and maintain security, stability, unity, and the rights of all Syrians.
- Kuwait: Kuwait welcomed the ceasefire agreement in the city of Suwayda and called for calming the situation and taking all necessary steps to prevent further bloodshed among the Syrian people. It also strongly condemned what it described as blatant Israeli attacks on Syrian territory, stressing that such actions constitute a continuation of violations of international law and the UN Charter.
- Lebanon: Lebanon strongly condemned the repeated Israeli strikes on Syrian territory, describing them as a blatant violation of the sovereignty Syria and a breach of international law. President Joseph Aoun emphasized that these continued attacks threaten regional security and called on the international community to take full responsibility and exert all possible pressure to halt them and respect Syria's sovereignty and territorial integrity. He reaffirmed Lebanon's solidarity with Syria and its people. Prime Minister Nawaf Salam also denounced the Israeli airstrikes as a clear breach of Syria's sovereignty and international law, rejecting the use of force as a form of messaging and urging the international community to intervene to stop such violations.
- Malaysia: Prime Minister Anwar Ibrahim condemned the Israeli airstrikes on Damascus calling them a violation of Syrian sovereignty that resulted in civilian casualties.
- Oman: The Ministry of Foreign Affairs condemned Israel's attacks on Syria, calling them a blatant violation of international law and Syrian sovereignty. The ministry urged the international community, especially the UN Security Council, to fulfill its legal and moral responsibilities by ensuring Israel's full withdrawal from occupied Syrian territories and halting all hostile actions against civilians.
- Qatar: Qatar expressed concerns over the tensions in Syria and called for accountability over civilian losses. It further condemned the Israeli strikes and expressed full support for the territorial integrity of Syria.
- Russia: Russia condemned the Israeli strikes in Syria, calling it a violation of Syria's sovereignty.
- Saudi Arabia: Saudi Arabia expressed its strong support for the actions taken by the Syrian government in order to attain territorial integrity, called on the international community to stand with Syria and condemned the Israeli airstrikes.
- Turkey: Turkey expressed its support for the actions taken by Syria to assure its territorial integrity and condemned the Israeli intervention in the conflict.
- United Arab Emirates: The UAE welcomed the announcement of a ceasefire in Suwayda, emphasizing the importance of de-escalation and civilian protection while supporting efforts to restore peace and stability in the region. It strongly condemned the recent escalation in southern Syria and denounced the Israeli airstrikes, reaffirming its rejection of any violations of Syrian sovereignty or threats to its security.
- United Kingdom: Special Envoy to Syria, Ann Snow, called for de-escalation and stated that the situation is being closely monitored, urging all parties within Syria to calm tensions and take immediate steps to ensure the protection of civilians. On 21 July, Foreign Secretary David Lammy called for the violence in Suwadya to be investigated, with those responsible being held "accountable".
- United States: The U.S. State Department said it "did not support Israel's recent action in Syria", referring to the Israeli strikes on Damascus. Secretary of State Marco Rubio said he was "very concerned" about the escalation, calling it a "misunderstanding". Ambassador to Syria Tom Barrack stated that the United States was working to de-escalate the conflict to restore peace and labeled the clashes as "worrisome". Barrack also declared support for Syria's government and criticized Israel's intervention in the country.
- Yemen: Yemen reaffirmed its full support for the Syrian government's efforts to restore security and stability across the country, emphasizing the need to ensure that weapons remain solely in the hands of the state and to protect civil peace. In an official statement, the Yemeni Ministry of Foreign Affairs expressed deep concern over the escalating tensions in southern Syria and backed the Syrian government's actions to assert full sovereignty and secure a dignified and stable future for the Syrian people. The ministry also rejected any attempts to hinder the government's authority over all Syrian territory.

In addition, the Syrian Ministry of Foreign Affairs and Expatriates stated that condemnations of Israeli attacks on Syria were also expressed by Afghanistan, Denmark, Greece, Norway, Pakistan, Panama, Sierra Leone, South Korea, Spain, and Switzerland.

==== Non-state actors ====
- Hamas: Hamas issued a statement expressing full solidarity with Syria and described the Israeli attacks as a "blatant violation of international laws" and called for a strong response to confront them. Hamas condemned what it called the "heinous Zionist aggression against the Syrian Arab Republic which led to the martyrdom of dozens from the army, security forces, and innocent civilians".
- Hezbollah: Hezbollah condemned the Israeli strikes, describing them as against international law, and expressed its support for the people of Syria. It called on citizens of Arab and Muslim nations to unite against Israeli aggression.

== See also ==
- 2025 Jaramana clashes
- Southern Syria clashes (April–May 2025)
- April 2025 massacres of Syrian Druze
