= Timeline of the Syrian civil war (2023) =

The following is a timeline of the Syrian civil war for 2023. Information about aggregated casualty counts is found in Casualties of the Syrian civil war.

== Overview ==
As of 2023, active fighting in the conflict between the Syrian government and rebel groups had mostly subsided, but there were occasional flareups in Northwestern Syria. In early 2023, reports indicated that the forces of ISIS in Syria had mostly been defeated, with only a few cells remaining in various remote locations.

As of 2023, Turkey was continuing its support for various rebel groups within Syria, which periodically attempted some operations against Kurdish groups. One stated goal was to create "safe zones" along Turkey's border with Syria, according to a statement by Turkish President Erdoğan. The operations were generally aimed at the Tal Rifaat and Manbij regions west of the Euphrates and other areas further east. President Erdoğan openly stated his support for the operations, in talks with Moscow in mid-2022.

In early 2023, Turkish-backed rebel groups carried out attacks against Kurdish forces, using tanks and artillery.

In March 2023, the Syrian government declared that it would not seek any reconciliation with Turkey, unless Turkey withdrew all of its proxy forces from Syria. This statement occurred in response to diplomatic efforts by Russia, which sought to encourage Syria and Turkey to seek reconciliation, and restoration of diplomatic ties.

In late March, Russia announced that it would host a summit which would include deputy foreign ministers from Russia, Syria, Iran, and Turkey.

In August 2023, renewed civil protests broke out across government-controlled regions of southern Syria.

=== Stalemate in civil conflict, renewed relations with Assad government ===
In early 2023, various sources reported that the conflict had settled into low-level conflict, which had mainly achieved a stalemate. One source stated:

The war whose brutality once dominated headlines has settled into an uncomfortable stalemate. Hopes for regime change have largely died out, peace talks have been fruitless, and some regional governments are reconsidering their opposition to engaging with Syrian leader Bashar al-Assad. The government has regained control of most of the country, and Assad’s hold on power seems secure. Meanwhile, the Syrian people are suffering an economic crisis, and a massive earthquake at the start of 2023 cast much of the population in the north into further despair.

One major NGO stated:

Twelve years into Syria’s devastating civil war, the conflict appears to have settled into a frozen state. Although roughly 30% of the country is controlled by opposition forces, heavy fighting has largely ceased and there is a growing regional trending toward normalizing relations with the regime of Bashar al-Assad. Over the last decade, the conflict erupted into one of the most complicated in the world, with a dizzying array of international and regional powers, opposition groups, proxies, local militias and extremist groups all playing a role. The Syrian population has been brutalized, with nearly a half a million killed, 12 million fleeing their homes to find safety elsewhere, and widespread poverty and hunger. Meanwhile, efforts to broker a political settlement have gone nowhere, leaving the Assad regime firmly in power.

=== Conflict with Turkish forces ===
In 2023, the main military conflict was not between the Syrian government and rebels, but rather between Turkish forces and factions within Syria. In late 2023, Turkish forces continued to attack Kurdish forces, in the region of Rojava,

== January ==
On 2 January, as part of Israel's continuing strikes against Syrian and Iranian targets, Israeli warplanes conducted several airstrikes on the Damascus International airport, killing 2 Syrian soldiers and temporarily putting the airport out of service.

On 4 January, 5 Manbij Military Council fighters were killed and another was injured by a remnant ISIS landmine whilst driving on a road near the village of Al-Said Ibrahim in the Manbij countryside.

On the same day, an Islamic State fighter was killed in clashes with SDF operatives in the village of Al-Zir, north of Mayadin.

On 7 January, 2 Pro-Assad fighters were killed in 2 separate attacks conducted by ISIS cells in the al-Rasafah and Palmyra deserts.

On 9 January, casualties were inflicted on a Pro-Assad militia near the town of Al-Jalaa in the Deir-ez-Zor countryside, after ISIS militants attacked Syrian military positions in the area. One ISIS militant was killed in the clashes.

On 10 January, joint forces of the US-led coalition and forces of the SDF launched a counter-terror operation in the village of Al-Sabaa wa Arbain where 2 ISIS fighters had barricaded themselves inside a house. One ISIS militant killed himself by detonating a suicide vest and the other was shot dead by the joint forces.

Between 10 and 11 January, as part of the ongoing clashes on the Idlib frontline 12 Syrian soldiers and 3 HTS militants were killed in violent clashes.

On 22 January, at least 16 civilians were killed after a damaged house collapsed in the city of Aleppo.

On 23 January, forces of the Syrian Army's 17th Division found the bodies of 9 dead militiamen of the Afghan Liwa Fatemiyoun militia, that fights for the Syrian government, in the desert near Al-Masrab. The patrol went missing in the area on 18 January. The militiamen had been stripped and slaughtered on the spot, likely by ISIS cells.

On the same day, 3 Syrian soldiers were killed after ISIS operatives, under the cover of fog, attacked a Syrian Army outpost near the Taqba Airbase.

On 25 January, 3 SDF fighters were killed after two ISIS operatives opened fire on an SDF checkpoint in the village of al-Hawaij in the Deir ez-Zor countryside.

On 30 January just after midnight, at least 10 people were killed in several airstrikes conducted by unidentified drones in the town of Abu Kamal near the Syria-Iraq border. Reports suggest trucks filled with Iranian weapons were the target of the attack.

== February ==
On 2 February, Turkish defence minister, Hulusi Akar announced the defence ministries of Turkey, Syrian and Russia will hold a meeting in Moscow to try and agree to a rapprochement and normalisation of relations between Syria and Turkey.

On 6 February, a magnitude 9 strike-slip earthquake took place along the East Anatolian Fault on the border of Turkey and Syria. The earthquake left tens of thousands dead and many more injured.

On 7 February, at least 20 ISIS fighters escaped a prison in the town of Raju, in the northern Afrin countryside, near Turkey, after the organisation bribed a prison guard.

On 10 February, 2 ISIS operatives, one of them an Iraqi, were killed in a joint Coalition-SDF raid near the town of Al-Suwar in the Deir ez-Zor countryside.

On the evening of 11 February, at least 75 people were abducted by ISIS in the Palmyra desert in the western Homs countryside. At least 12 of the abductees were executed including a Syrian soldier.

On 17 February, at least 68 people, including 7 Syrian soldiers, were killed in an ISIS attack on a large group of truffle farmers in the desert near Al-Sukhnah.

On 19 February, just after midnight, 15 people were killed in an Israeli airstrike in Damascus.

Later that day, 6 SNA fighters were killed in an ambush by ISIS operatives in the Tuwainan area of the Raqqa countryside.

On 24 February, a senior Iraqi militant of Hurras al-Din and another individual were killed in a Coalition airstrike in the village of Mashhad Ruhin in Idlib.

On 27 February, 10 civilians were killed and 12 others were injured by possible remnant ISIS landmines east of Salamiyah.

== March ==
On 2 March, 8 civilians were killed and 35 were wounded after a civilian farming truck drove over a suspected ISIS landmine near Kobajjep in the Syrian desert.

On 4 March, in the southern Raqqa countryside, a shepherd was killed and 1,000 sheep were stolen after an ISIS attack.

At midnight on 8 March, 3 people were killed after Israeli warplanes bombed and temporarily shut down Aleppo's airport.

On the same day, at least 7 people were killed in a suspected Israeli drone strike on an alleged weapon factory in Deir ez-Zor city.

On 9 March, amid ongoing insurgent attack in Daraa Governorate, a Syrian Army patrol was ambushed on the Daraa-Damascus highway in southern Syria. 3 Syrian soldiers and an insurgent were killed in the ambush.

On the same day, Syrian forces lost contact with NDF patrol, consisting of 'Al-Bosaraya' tribesmen, in the Jabal Bishri area of the Syrian desert. All 12 militiamen were found dead in the area in the following weeks.

On 11 March, ISIS militants attacked a group of truffle farmers in the Khanaser desert south of Aleppo. 3 farmers were executed on the spot by the ISIS attackers whilst another 26 others were abducted.

On 15 March, the war entered its twelfth year. The anniversary was marked by protests in rebel-held areas like Idlib, where protesters vowed to 'continue the revolution against the al-Assad regime.'

On 17 March, 9 'anti-terror' SDF fighters were killed in a double helicopter crash in the Duhok Governorate of Iraq.

On 19 March, Israeli operatives assassinated 31-year-old Ali Ramzi al-Aswad a Palestinian Islamic Jihad member in Damascus.

On 20 March, fighters of Ahrar al-Sharqiyah killed 4 ethnic Kurds in the town of Jindires, northern Syria, after opening fire into a crowd celebrating Newroz.

On the same day, 2 NDF militiamen were killed by a landmine whilst combing the desert near Palmyra for ISIS cells.

On 23 March, 19 people, including 16 Iranian-backed militiamen and 3 Syrian soldiers, were killed in a set of American airstrikes in the city of Deir ez-Zor and the towns of Mayadin and Abu Kemal. The airstrikes follow a drone attack on an American base in the al-Hasakha countryside, in which an American contractor was killed and 7 soldiers were injured.

On the same day, at least 15 people, including 7 civilians and 8 Syrian soldiers, were captured and executed by having their throats slit after ISIS militants attacked them whilst they were collecting truffle in the Hama desert. At least another 40 people were also reported missing after the attack.

On 26 March, 4 civilians were killed and others were abducted in an ISIS attack on workers in the Shaer gas field area in the Palmyra desert.

On 28 March, 3 civilians were killed in an ISIS attack in the rural area of Al-Salamiyah, east of Hama.

On 30 March, Milad Heydari, an Iranian IRGC adviser was killed in an Israeli airstrike in Damascus.

On the same day, 3 Syrian soldiers were killed in an ambush by insurgents in the town of Al-Shajara, Daraa.

On 31 March, 7 people were killed in smuggling related clashes on the Syrian-Jordanian border in the Jalghim area near Al-Hammad.

On the same day, 2 ISIS fighters were killed by Kurdish security forces in an attempted suicide bombing attack on a military post in Al-Hasakah city.

== April ==
On 1 April, 2 Syrian soldiers, including a lieutenant, were killed after their vehicle drove over a landmine in the desert south of Deir ez-Zor.

On 3 April, a senior ISIS militant, by the name of Khalid Aydd Ahmad Al Jabouri, was killed in an American airstrike in the al-Hasakah countryside.

On 4 April, 2 civilians were killed in an Israeli airstrike in Damascus.

Between 4 and 6 April, 9 Liwa al-Quds militiamen were killed in attacks by ISIS insurgents in the Homs/Palmyra part Syrian desert

On 9 April, at least 9 civilians were killed after their vehicle hit a landmine in the Deir ez-Zor countryside.

On 10 April, 4 Liwa al Quds militiamen were killed and another was injured after ISIS fighters attacked a Syrian Army checkpoint near Jab Al-Jirrah in the Homs countryside.

On 16 April, at least 36 people, including 17 NDF militiamen, were killed in a massacre by ISIS militants in the eastern Hama countryside. Another 5 civilians were also killed in a separate ISIS attack near the town of Baqrus, in the Deir ez-Zor countryside.

Furthermore, 2 Liwa al-Quds militiamen, including a lieutenant, were killed and another 3 were injured in an ISIS attack near the village of Arak in the Palmyra desert.

On 17 April, a senior ISIS militant by the name of Abd-al-Hadi Mahmud al-Haji Ali and 2 other ISIS militants were killed in an American helicopter raid in the village of Al-Suweidah, about 9 km south of the Syrian-Turkish border.

On 24 April, 3 militiamen working as part of the IRGC were killed after ISIS militants, on a motorcycle, opened fire on the group in the eastern Deir ez-Zor countryside.

On 27 April, a commander of the Deir ez-Zor Military Council was assassinated by suspected ISIS operatives in the village of Al-Busayrah.

On 28 April, 2 SDF fighters were killed and 3 others were wounded by an IED explosion on the road between Raqqa and Al-Hazimah village in the Raqqa countryside.

The SOHR reported that 407 people were killed in Syria during the month, making April 2023 the deadliest month since January 2022.

== May ==
On 1 May, at least 13 people, including 8 Pro-Assad militiamen and 2 civilians, were killed in an ISIS ambush in the desert near Al-Salihiyah, Deir ez-Zor.

On 2 May, at least 9 Pro-Assad soldiers and militiamen were killed in Israeli airstrikes on Syrian facilities in the al-Nayrab military airport in Aleppo.

On 4 May, as part of increasing tensions and clashes in Idlib and north-western Syria, HTS executed an ex-fighter after accusing him of spying.

In the early hours of 8 May, Jordanian warplanes launched its first ever airstrikes against targets linked to the Assad government, on a house in the village of Shuab, As-Suwayda. The airstrike targeted a well known drug dealer by the name of Merhi Ramthan. Merhi, his wife and six children were killed in the airstrike. Another set of strikes bombed a major drug factory operated by Iran-backed militant groups in Daraa governorate.

On 7 May, the Arab League agreed to re-admit Syria into the league. The rapprochement occurred amid a diplomatic push by the Assad government to normalize relations with regional governments that began in February 2023. President Al-Assad attended the Arab League summit in Saudi Arabia on May 19.

On 10 May, an IED exploded in Damascus targeting Syrian police instantly killing a police superintendent. Two other police officers later died of their injuries. The Islamic State (ISIS) claimed responsibility.

On 14 May, an SDF fighter was found beheaded by suspected ISIS fighters in central Taqba.

On 15 May, ISIS militants fired a rocket at a Syrian military bus in the al-Sukhnah desert, killing 2 Syrian soldiers and a civilian.

On 16 May, a Syrian Army vehicle was ambushed by ISIS operatives in the Al-Rasafah desert. 3 Syrian soldiers were found killed at the site of the attack including artillery Brigadier General Iyad Murhij.

On 18 May, a Pro-Assad judge by the name of Munther Othman Al-Salamat was shot dead by gunmen in the town of Izra, Daraa.

On 22 May, the Syrian foreign minister Faisal Mekdad announced there would be no normalisation with Turkey until Turkish soldiers left Syria. On 23 May, the SOHR reported that Turkish soldiers had begun to abandon their military checkpoints in the Idlib countryside.

On 24 May, 2 Liwa al-Quds fighters were killed after ISIS operatives ambushed a Syrian military vehicle in the Al-Sha'rah area of the Homs desert.

On the same day, 3 Pro-Assad militiamen were killed after ISIS operatives attacked a Syrian military post in the Ma'adan area, south of Raqqa.

On 25 May, 2 Syrian soldiers were killed in combing operations in the Deir ez-Zor and Homs deserts.

On 27 May, as part of the Daraa insurgency, 2 people working with Syrian intelligence were killed in an IED blast targeting their vehicle about 45 km north of Daraa city.

In the month of May 2023, at least 2 ISIS militants were killed in U.S. military operations in the country.

== June ==
On 6 June, 4 people of the same family were killed after ISIS operatives attacked a group of grain farmers in the al-Sukhnah desert. On the same day, ISIS militants killed a member of the Deir ez-Zor Military Council and injured another 3 in an armed ambush in the Al-Saadah area, north of Deir ez-Zor.

On 7 June, a Syrian soldier was killed and another was injured by a landmine explosion near the village of Tel Salma in the Hama countryside.

On 8 June, 4 people working with the Syrian Air Force Intelligence Directorate were ambushed and shot dead in their car on the Atman road, north of Daraa. This attack came 3 days after a large IED explosion killed 2 Syrian soldiers and injured another on the road between Kafr Nassij and Al-Mal, north of Daraa.

On 10 June, 3 YPG fighters, including a commander, were killed and 2 others were injured in a suspected Turkish drone strike on their military vehicle in the town of Adhas in the northern Aleppo countryside.

On 11 June, a Russian soldier was killed and another 4 were wounded after Turkish forces shelled their military vehicle near the village of Herbel in the Aleppo countryside. This came a day after a Turkish drone strike killed 3 Kurdish fighters on the same frontline.

On the same day, ISIS militants fired a rocket at a military checkpoint near an Iranian military base in the al-Mayadeen desert, killing 5 Pro-Assad fighters.

On 12 June, 5 members of Syrian security forces, including a Syrian army lieutenant, were killed in a string of attacks across Quneitra Governorate, next to the occupied Golan heights.

On 13 June, Turkish forces launched drone strikes and shelled multiple areas of northern Syria, including Kobani where 3 civilians were severely injured by shelling. A drone strike also targeted Syrian military positions near in the vicinity of Oqayba village in the Aleppo countryside, killing 3 Syrian soldiers.

Furthermore, a suspected Turkish drone bombed a Syrian Army tank on the Tell Rifaat frontline, destroying the tank and wounding 3 Syrian soldiers.

Also, in Homs city, an IED exploded targeting Syrian Army brigadier general Ja’far Ali al-Akhras, killing him immediately. It is reported ISIS insurgents were behind the attack.

On 14 June, Turkish forces furthermore launches shelling and drone strikes in northern Syria. 4 fighters of the Manbij Military Council were killed by a Turkish drone strike in Manbij. A civilian was also killed in a separate attack nearby. Also in the same set of attacks, 5 Syrian soldiers were killed in Turkish shelling on the Tell Rifaat frontline.

Later that day, 4 SDF commanders were killed and another 3 were injured after a Turkish drone targeted their military vehicle on a road Al-Qamishly and Al-Malkiya in Al-Hasakah countryside. Another Turkish drone strike in Al-Sayad village, in the Manbij countryside, killed 2 fighters of the Manbij military council.

On 17 June, ISIS militants assassinated an SDF fighter in the village of al-Shabahat, north of Deir ez-Zor.

On the same day, 3 SDF fighters were killed and another was injured after ISIS militants set off an IED targeting their vehicle on the road between Ayn Issa and Tel Samen, Raqqa.

On 18 June, as part of a recent increase of insurgent activity in Homs, an IED exploded targeting a Syrian military bus near Al-Mushrifah, killing 3 Syrian soldiers and injuring another 10. The SOHR released images of the attack's aftermath.

Also on 18 June, 25 ISIS members escaped from an SDF operated prison in Ras al-Ayn.

On 19 June, 5 Syrian soldiers were killed and an officer was injured after their vehicle drove over a landmine in Ayyash village, north of Deir ez-Zor.

On 23 June, 2 ISIS members, including an Iraqi commander, were found executed in the desert area of al-Suwar.

On the same day, Syrian Army Brigadier General, Yusuf Mansour Ismail, was shot dead in an ambush in the village of Al-Shajar, Hama.

On 25 June, 4 Syrian GID officers were killed and another was seriously injured after insurgents ambushed their vehicle between Tafs and Daraa city.

On the same day, 4 Baqir Brigade militiamen were killed in a landmine explosion on a road near Ithriyah.

On 27 June, a female SDF member was assassinated by suspected ISIS operatives near al-Busayrah, Deir ez-Zor.

On 28 June, a Syrian soldier was shot dead by ISIS insurgents in the town of Sabikhan, Deir ez-Zor.

The SOHR reported that 271 people were killed in Syria in June 2023.

== July ==
On 16 July, the SOHR reported that the overall security situation in Daraa was becoming increasingly violent, with more that 230 people being reportedly killed in the governorate since the beginning of 2023, 103 of which were Syrian soldiers and their collaborators.

On 23 July, 8 Syrian soldiers were killed and 9 others were injured after a Syrian military bus was destroyed either by a landmine or a drone strike in the area of the Twinan gas field in the Syrian desert.

On 27 July, at least 10 people were killed and around 20 injured in a car-bomb attack targeting the headquarters of IRGC-linked Iranian militant groups in the southern suburbs of Damascus. ISIS claimed responsibility for the attack.

On 28 July, 4 people were killed and 8 others were injured in a Turkish drone strike on an SDF training camp near the village of Khirbat Khowa in the al-Hasakah countryside.

On 29 July, 5 SNA fighters were killed in a Kurdish infiltration operation on the Kaljibrin frontline, north of Aleppo.

On 31 July, 2 SNA fighters were killed and another 3 were injured in SAA and Kurdish shelling attacks on the Basufan frontline.

The SOHR reported that 288 people were killed in Syria in July 2023.

== August ==
On 1 August, five government soldiers and two truck drivers were killed after ISIS militants ambushed an SAA oil tanker convoy on a road in the eastern Hama countryside, according to SOHR.

On 2 August, four SDF fighters were killed in a Turkish drone strike that targeted 2 cars in the suburbs of Qamishli city, in northern Syria.

On 5 August, according to SOHR, three civilian family members were killed when Russian warplanes struck the outskirts of Idlib city.

In the early hours of the morning on 7 August, at least four government soldiers were killed in Israeli airstrikes on Syrian air defence systems near Damascus.

Later in the evening on 7 August, 10 government soldiers were killed and six others were injured in a night-time attack by ISIS militants on a Syrian military point in the town of Maa'dan Ateeq in the Raqqa countryside.

On 9 August, Sama TV correspondent Firas al-Ahmad and two government soldiers were killed in an IED explosion in Daraa.

On 10 August: emergence of the 10th August movement, a pan-Syrian protest movement, was launched in the coastal region, distributing thousands of pieces of paper with calls for an end to economic mismanagement and giving deadlines for pay rises and curbs on prices. Leaflets were distributed in Banias, Jableh, Tartous and Latakia (all places with significant Alawite populations), and the movement condemned violence and sectarianism. At the same time, a declaration was released by the "Free Alawite Officers", who said they were speaking from "the heart of the Syrian coast" and specifically from al-Kurdaha, the hometown of President al-Assad.

On 10 August, at least 33 government soldiers of the SAA's 17th Division were killed and around 10 others were injured in a night-time ambush by ISIS militants targeting two Syrian military buses near the city of Al-Mayadeen in the western Deir Ezzor countryside.

On 13 August, five NDF fighters were killed in an attack by ISIS insurgents on a government military post near a salt mine near al-Tabani in the Deir ez-Zor countryside.

On 15 August, three pro-government militiamen were killed and eight others were injured in an ISIS attack on an SAA ammunition warehouse in the eastern countryside of Homs.

Between 1-15 August, at least 60 government soldiers and militiamen had been killed by ISIS in attacks in the Syrian desert.

There were some reports of protests against deteriorating living conditions on Wednesday 16 August. Taxi and bus drivers in Damascus staged two days of partial stoppages on 16-17 August.

On 17 August: start of general strike and protest wave in southern Syria. A general strike was declared in Suweida on Thursday 17 August. Targeting the police headquarters and the governor's office, hundreds of protesters chanted anti-government slogans, such as "Long live Syria and down with Bashar al-Assad!" Some villages in Daraa province participated in the strikes, with demonstrators raising the Syrian revolutionary flag and chanting, "Bashar … Go! We want to live!"

On Friday 18 August, there were demonstrations across southern Syria after Friday prayer. In many places, protests took the form of holding up and photographing slips of paper with anti-government slogans in front of iconic locations. Protests continued in Daraa province on Saturday 19 August; protestors outside the Umayyad Mosque in Daraa city waved the Syrian revolutionary flags.

Sheikh Hikmat al-Hijri, the spiritual leader of the Druze, issued a statement on 19 August expressing concern about the economic situation and calling for action to achieve change and justice.

On 19 August, a member of the Syrian government's security apparatus was shot dead by ISIS insurgents in the city al-Mayadeen.

On 20 August, two government soldiers were killed and another four were injured by Turkish artillery bombardment on a Syrian military post in the village of Tokhar in the Manbij countryside, according to the SOHR.

On 20 August, the general strike deepened. Roads were closed, and Suweida’s Department of Education announced the postponement of scheduled exams at its Damascus University branch, with state media saying this was due to road closures. Large number of protestors in Southern Syria began protesting against the government. Protests erupted first in Karama Square in Druze-majority city of Suwayda. 42 protests were held across As-Suwayda governorate, and spread to the neighbouring province of Daraa, often known as the "Cradle of the Syrian Revolution", with protests in Daraa villages Nawa, Jasem Sanamein and Da'el. Protestors in Suwayda waved Druze. They also chanted the slogans of 2011 Syrian revolution, demanding the downfall of Assad regime and expulsion of Iranian presence from the country. Protestors led mass demonstrations, sit-ins and blocked roads to the Baath party headquarters in Suweida. There were reports of government forces shooting on unarmed protestors in the Nawa and Da'el districts of Daraa city.

On 21 August, OSHR reported that at least 13 fighters from Hayat Tahrir al Sham were killed by Russian airstrikes near Idlib city.

Late on 22 August, Russian air attacks killed two in Arri, west of the Idlib's provincial capital.

The same day, there was a youth protest in the town of Sayda, situated to the east of Daraa, calling for "the ousting of the regime".

By 23 August, protestors had raided Ba'ath party offices across Southern Syria and blocked the highway connecting Suwayda to Damascus. The same day, government media reported Israeli airstrikes on Damascus, wounding one soldier.

On 27 August, over 11 government fighters, mainly from the 5th Corps Special Tasks’ Commandos, were killed, and several more injured, in a tunnel bomb attack in southern Idlib attributed to Islamist anti-Assad faction Ansar al-Tawhid.

On 28 August, according to government sources, Israel struck Nayrab military airbase and put nearby Aleppo International Airport out of action in the early hours. The same day, two Syrian soldiers were executed by ISIS militants near the al-Tanf area in the Syrian desert. On the same day, two Syrian soldiers were also killed by a suspected ISIS IED blast near the village of Al-Ruwaida, Hama, according to SOHR.

On 29 August 2023, protests and civil disobedience continued with Baath government offices being shut down in As-Suwayda.

Between 27 and 31 August, at least 45 people, including 25 tribesmen, 11 SDF members, 5 civilians and 4 unknown people were killed in clashes between Arab tribes and SDF members following increased tensions in the Deir ez-Zor countryside. This comes after SDF forces arrested Rashid Abu Khawla, the head of the Deir ez-Zor Military Council.

In 31 August, clashes broke out in the Damascene country-side between local people and militants of Maher al-Assad's 4th Armoured Division in the town of Zakiyah. This was after a civilian, who discovered that some of the division's commanders bombed a store used for keeping water well machinery, was shot dead by pro-Assad militants. This sparked fierce confrontations between locals and 4th Armoured Division, killing three militants of the Division and two residents. Anti-Assad activities had been rising in Zakiyah since the eruption of protests across Syria; and Assad regime had deployed troops across Rif Dimashq in August. Several houses of the 4th Armoured Division soldiers were burned down by angered locals.

During the month of August 2023, the SOHR reported that at least 440 people had been killed in Syria, making the month the deadliest in 19 months.

== September ==
On 3 September, amid increased clashes across the Deir ez-Zor governorate, 24 SNA and 5 Syrian soldiers were killed in an SNA infiltration attempt and following clashes in the area of Tell Tamir in the northern al-Hasakah countryside.

On 4 September, 5 SNA fighters were killed after forces of the Manbij Military Council bombarded the areas near the village of Arab Hassan Kabir in the northeastern Aleppo countryside.

On 6 September, 8 SNA fighters were killed in a Kurdish attack on two military vehicles on the Al-Boghaz frontline, west of Manbij.

On 7 September, 2 Syrian soldiers, 6 SNA fighters and 2 Manbij military council fighters were killed in an SNA attack on the village of Arab Hasan village in the Manbij countryside.

On 10 September, 6 Pro-Assad militiamen and 3 shepherds were killed in an attack by ISIS militants in the al-Shoula desert.

On 13 September, 2 SAA soldiers were killed and 6 others were wounded by an Israeli airstrike on Syrian air defence systems in Tartus.

On 15 September, 2 YPJ fighters were killed by a Turkish drone strike near the village of al-Hattabat, south of Manbij.

On 17 September, 4 Asayish security personnel were killed in a Turkish drone strike on a car in the al-Qamishli countryside.

On 18 September, 14 SNA fighters were killed in a Kurdish infiltration attack in the outskirts of al-Bab city in the Aleppo countryside.

On the same day, 3 Pro-Assad militiamen were killed after ISIS militants opened fire on a Syrian military patrol in the desert near Al-Sukhnah.

On 20 September, forces of the Manbij Military Council launched an infiltration operation on the frontlines of Sheikh Nasser, Al-Jatal and Al-Karbajli in Al-Bab countryside, killing at least 4 militants of the Sultan Murad Division.

On 21 September, 2 Palestinian Islamic Jihad fighters were blown up and killed by an Israeli drone strike whilst riding a motorcycle near Beit Jinn, southern Syria.

On 22 September, following infighting between SAA and NDF forces in al-Hasakah city, NDF commander Abd Al-Qader Hammo was killed by Syrian Army forces.

On 24 September, 2 jihadists of the HTS-backed 'Ahrar Al-Awlan' were killed in clashes with SNA forces on the outskirts of Haj Kosa village in the al-Bab countryside.

On 25 September, clashes between gunmen and SDF forces resumed in Deir ez-Zor governorate, notably in the settlements of Diban, Hawaij Thiban and Al-Tayanah in Deir Ezzor countryside. During the clashes, 18 local gunmen, 3 SDF members and a civilian were killed in clashes in the town of Diban in the Deir ez-Zor countryside.

On the same day, 3 SNA fighters were killed in an infiltration operation by forces of the Manbij Military Council in the area of Al-Sayad mountain in the Manbij countryside.

On 26 September, 3 gunmen and an SDF fighter were killed in clashes in Deir ez-Zor governorate.

Between 25-26 September, 4 SAA soldiers were killed in clashes between Syrian border guards and smugglers in the Qalamoun Mountains on the border with Lebanon in Rif Dimashq.

On 28 September, 3 SAA soldiers were killed by an IED explosion, detonated by ISIS insurgents near Ithriya.

The SOHR reported that at least 440 people were killed in Syria in September 2023.

== October ==
On 2 October, two SAA soldiers were killed by an IED explosion on the road between Al-Gharyiah Al-Sharqiyah and Al-Masyfrah in eastern Daraa countryside.

On the same day, two NDF militiamen were killed and three were wounded in an attack by ISIS insurgents on Syrian military positions near the Al-Taim oil field.

On 3 October, six pro-Assad militiamen were killed and four others were wounded by suspected Israeli airstrikes on military sites near the town of Abu Kemal.

On 5 October, a drone strike in Homs of a Syrian military graduation ceremony at the Homs military academy left at least 129 people dead and over 120 injured. The Turkish Armed Forces launched a series of airstrikes in the SDF-controlled regions of Hasakah.

On 6 October, 3 SAA soldiers were killed and 2 others were injured near Tel Al-Asfar in the As-Suwayda desert.

Between 14 and 19 October, at least 7 SDF members and 2 civilians were killed in various ISIS attacks in the Rojava region of Syria.

On 24 October, 4 fighters of the Baqir Brigade were killed in an ISIS attack north of Al-Sukhna in Homs countryside. On the same day, 4 tribal shepherds and 2 ISIS fighters were killed in an ISIS attack in the eastern Ithriya Desert in Hama countryside.

On 25 October, following the outbreak of the Gaza war, 11 Syrian Army soldiers were killed in Israeli artillery airstrikes on SAA positions in the vicinity of Qarfa, Daraa.

On 27 October, 3 SDF fighters were killed by ISIS insurgents in the town of Al-Hawa’aj in the eastern Deir Ezzor countryside.

On 29 October, 19 people were killed in clashes between SDF and tribal forces in the towns of Shahil, Dhiban, and Abu Hardoub in the eastern countryside of Deir ez-Zor.

During the month of October 2023, the SOHR reported that 544 people were killed in Syria, making the month the deadliest in 21 months, following an increase of violence within the country.

== November ==
On 2 November, 6 fighters of the al-Hamza division were killed by SDF shelling near a Turkish base near Abu Rasin in the al-Hasakah countryside.

On the morning of 8 November, at least 34 Pro-Syrian Regime forces were killed and more than a dozen others were wounded, some in critical condition, in a massive wave of simultaneous attacks by ISIS militants on several military checkpoints and positions in the Raqqa-Homs-Deir Ezzor triangle area.

Following the attack, at least 7 ISIS militants were killed in Russian airstrikes on ISIS hideouts in the area.

On 7 November, 9 people were killed in an American airstrike that targeted Iranian-backed militias near Abu Kemal on the Syrian-Iraqi border.

On 12 November, 8 people were killed in U.S airstrikes near al-Mayadeen city in the Deir ez-Zor countryside.

On 13 November, 3 Syrian soldiers were killed in an ISIS attack on an SAA military post near the Juaydin junction in Al-Rasafah countryside in Al-Raqqah desert.

At midnight between 13 and 14 November, 5 Syrian soldiers were killed after ISIS militants attacked SAA checkpoints near Al-Taibah and Al-Kom villages, north of Al-Sukhnah city.

On 20 November, during combing operations, 6 ISIS fighters were killed by Russian airstrikes in the vicinity of Al-Deybiyat gas field in eastern Homs countryside. Furthermore, 4 Syrian soldiers were killed in clashes with ISIS insurgents in the same area.

On 26 November, 8 NDF militiamen were killed and 14 others were injured by an ISIS landmine explosion during combing operations in Al-Shajeri village in the Deir ez-Zor countryside.

On 27 November, 4 Pro-Assad militiamen were killed after ISIS militants attacked a military post 35 kilometres east of Palmyra city. Russian warplanes conducted airstrikes in response, however no casualties were reported.

Amid recent clashes in the Syrian desert, 2 NDF militiamen were killed in clashes with ISIS militants in the al-Sukhnah desert.

In the month of November 2023, the SOHR reported that 375 people were killed in Syria.

== December ==
On 4 December, 6 Pro-Assad militiamen were killed and several others were injured after ISIS insurgents detonated an IED targeting a military vehicle on a road between Palmyra and Homs in the Syrian desert.

On 7 December, 5 Pro-Assad militiamen were killed in an ISIS attack in the desert west of Abu Kemal. Furthermore, 2 SAA soldiers were killed in a separate ISIS attack on a Syrian Army post near the city of Tabqa.

On 10 December, 4 NDF militiamen were killed by a landmine whilst trying to receive a body after ISIS militants executed a civilian in the Al-Bohamad Desert in eastern Al-Raqqa countryside.

Later in the evening, 2 Hezbollah fighters and 2 Syrian workers were killed in a series of Israeli airstrikes around Damascus.

On 11 December, 2 Pro-Assad militiamen were killed in an ISIS attack near Al-Asharah, Deir ez-Zor.

On 17 December, 2 NDF militiamen and an ISIS fighter were killed in clashes in the Homs desert.

On 20 December, 8 SAA soldiers were killed after an ISIS landmine detonated under a military bus near the 'T3' junction in the Palmyra desert.

On 25 December, Iranian IRGC general Razi Mousavi was killed in an Israeli airstrike in Sayyidah Zaynab, Rif-Dimashq.

On 30 December, 23 Pro-Iranian militiamen were killed in Israeli airstrikes on their positions near Abu Kemal, on the border between Iraq and Syria.

Later that evening, four Iran-backed non-Syrian personnel were killed in Israeli airstrikes near the Al-Nairab military airport near Aleppo.

ACLED recorded the deaths of at least 6,267 people as a result of the war in Syria in 2023.
