= Youssef Jarbou =

Spiritual leader of the Druze community in Syria

Sheikh Youssef Jarbou
- يوسف جربوع

Personal life
- Born: 1970 (age 55–56) Suwayda, Syria
- Occupation: Spiritual leader of the Druze community in Syria

Religious life
- Religion: Druze

Youssef Jarbou (Arabic: يوسف جربوع) is a Syrian Druze religious leader who has served as one of the spiritual leaders of the Druze community in Syria since 20 December 2012, following the death of his cousin and predecessor, Hussein Jarbou, who was preceded by Ahmed Jarbu. A member of a family that has held this religious office for over three centuries in Jabal al-Arab, Jarbou wields significant religious and social influence within the Druze community, particularly in the Suwayda Governorate.

Jarbou is widely recognized for his firm support of the regime of former Syrian dictator Bashar al-Assad. Unlike the other two Druze sheikhs, Hikmat al-Hijri and Hammoud al-Hinnawi, who occasionally sided with anti-government protests, Jarbou consistently aligned himself with state authorities and institutions. He openly rejected the 2023 protest movement in Suwayda and has framed opposition activity as externally driven subversion.

Throughout his tenure under the Assad administration, Jarbou emphasized the importance of preserving Druze traditions, unity, and loyalty to the state. He at times acted as a mediator between the Druze community and the Assad regime, attending state functions and meeting frequently with security officials. He participated in the launch of a reconciliation center in Suwayda in October 2022 alongside high-ranking intelligence officials, encouraging military draft evaders to return to government service.

Jarbou also supported initiatives aligned with the Assad regime, including cooperation with organizations like the Syrian Trust for Development, a foundation that was headed by Asma al-Assad. In 2021, he advocated for the creation of a new Druze militia in coordination with Hezbollah and the Syrian Army's 4th Division, then commanded by Maher al-Assad, to reassert control over Suwayda, which had seen diminishing government presence.

Jarbou faced criticism from within the Druze community, including allegations of corruption related to the management of religious endowments and accusations of facilitating the Assad regime's efforts to suppress dissent in Suwayda.

After the fall of the Assad regime in December 2024, Jarbou endorsed a rare religious visit by Syrian Druze clerics to Israel in March 2025, describing it as a spiritual rather than political initiative. The visit sparked controversy, especially given the lack of formal relations between Syria and Israel.

In the first half of 2025, Jarbou joined fellow Druze religious leaders al-Hanawi and al-Hijri in signing a series of security agreements with the new Syrian government of Ahmed al-Sharaa, though these agreements failed due to lack of subsequent cooperation by al-Hijri, who counted a major alliance of Druze militias among his followers. According to one journalist from Suwayda, Jarbou and al-Hanawi were "aligned with" al-Sharaa's government, while al-Hijri "categorically rejected" it.

Jarbou and fellow Druze spiritual leader Hammoud al-Hanawi were sidelined by rival Druze spiritual leader Hikmat al-Hijri following the July 2025 violence in Suwayda, allegedly facing house arrest under threat of death, and subsequently making public statements consistent with al-Hijri's political positions.

== See also ==
- Druze in Syria
- Hikmat al-Hijri
- Hammoud al-Hinnawi
