= At-Tira, Suwayda =

At-Tira الطيرة At-Tireh
- Village
- Location within Syria
- Coordinates: 32°45′45″N 36°26′29″E
- Grid position: 285/241
- Country: Syria
- Governorate: Suwayda
- District: Suwayda
- Subdistrict: Mazraa

Population (2004 census)
  - Total: 507
- Time zone: UTC+2 (EET)
  - Summer (DST): UTC+3 (EEST)

See Tira for other sites with similar names.

At-Tira (Arabic: الطيرة, also spelled At-Tireh) is a village in southern Syria, administratively part of the Suwayda Governorate. According to the Syria Central Bureau of Statistics (CBS), At-Tira had a population of 507 in the 2004 census. Its inhabitants are predominantly Druze.

The village's residents were displaced during the Southern Syria clashes in July of 2025 and the settlement remains uninhabited as of April 2026.

== See also ==
- Druze in Syria
