= Hammoud al-Hanawi =

Spiritual leader of the Druze community in Syria

Sheikh Hammoud al-Hanawi
- حمود الحناوي

Personal life
- Born: 1 December 1943 (age 82) Sahwet Blata, As-Suwayda, Syria, French Mandate
- Occupation: Spiritual leader of the Druze community in Syria

Religious life
- Religion: Druze

Hammoud al-Hanawi (Arabic: حمود الحناوي; born 1 December 1943) is one of the leading spiritual figures of the Druze community in Syria, holding the title of Sheikh al-‘Aql. He is regarded as a prominent religious authority among the Druze of As-Suwayda Governorate.

== Early life and education ==
Al-Hanawi was born in the village of Sahwet Blata in As-Suwayda Governorate, southern Syria on 1 December 1943. He grew up in a religious environment and was educated by notable Druze scholars in the region. His grandfather, Sheikh and poet Qassam al-Hanawi, was a well-known figure in the history of Jabal al-Druze.

He studied at Dar al-Hikma Secondary School in As-Suwayda, graduating in 1963. He then worked as an Arabic language teacher for 14 years in Deir ez-Zor and later taught in the villages of al-Kafr and Sahwet Blata.

He also pursued higher education in Arabic and graduated in 1975.

== Career ==
Al-Hanawi later moved to the United Arab Emirates, where he worked as a teacher and journalist for newspapers such as Al-Bayan and Al-Khaleej. After being entrusted with the responsibilities of Sheikh al-‘Aql (religious leader) in Syria, he returned to assume the role, succeeding his father.

== Leadership and spiritual role ==
His appointment coincided with internal divisions among Druze religious authorities in As-Suwayda, leading to the emergence of two main clerical institutions: one led by Hikmat al-Hijri in the town of al-Qurayya, and another led jointly by al-Hanawi and Youssef Jarbou in Ayn al-Zaman.

Throughout the Syrian civil war, al-Hanawi reportedly maintained a neutral stance, advocating for civil peace and calling for national dialogue. He emphasized the importance of social cohesion and minority rights, and supported a peaceful resolution to the conflict. He was known to oppose sectarian fragmentation and warned of its dangers for Syria's future.

During the protests in southern Syria around the end of the Syrian revolution, al-Hanawi participated in protests held at the mausoleum of Sultan al-Atrash, a major Druze figure.

In the half year following the fall of Assad and end of the Syrian Civil War, al-Hanawi joined fellow Druze religious leaders Jarbou and al-Hijri in signing a series security agreements with the new Syrian government of Ahmed al-Sharaa, though these agreements failed due to lack of subsequent cooperation by al-Hijri, who counted a major alliance of Druze militias among his followers. According to one journalist from Suwayda, Jarbou and al-Hanawi were "aligned with" al-Sharaa's government, while al-Hijri "categorically rejected" it.

Al-Hanawi and fellow Druze spiritual leader Youssef Jarbou were sidelined by rival Druze spiritual leader Hikmat al-Hijri following the July 2025 violence in Suwayda, allegedly facing house arrest under threat of death. Shortly afterwards, in a recorded statement on 9 August 2025, al-Hanawi expressed sharp criticism against the Syrian transitional government—the first such stance since the fall of the Assad regime. In the recorded statement, which was the first since the beginning of clashes in southern Syria in July, he condemned the authorities for betraying the nation and violating their commitments, describing the government as treacherous and oppressive toward innocent people. He called on international bodies and humanitarian organizations to urgently lift the siege on Suwayda, allow unrestricted humanitarian access, and investigate those responsible for brutal crimes against the Druze community. Al-Hanawi stressed that the conflict has become a fight for survival, not just political maneuvering. He concluded by thanking the Druze spiritual leader in Israel, Muwaffaq Tarif, for his support.

== See also ==
- Druze in Syria
- Hikmat al-Hijri
- Youssef Jarbou
