= 2023 Ankara bombing =

Suicide attack in Turkey

Coordinates: 39°54′52″N 32°51′6″E

- Location: Ankara, Turkey
- Date: 1 October 2023 c. 9:30 a.m. (TRT)
- Target: General Directorate of Security building
- Attack type: Suicide bombing
- Deaths: 2 (the perpetrators) One civilian killed by the PKK prior to the attack
- Injuries: 2
- Perpetrator: PKK (claimed responsibility)

On 1 October 2023, a suicide bombing occurred in front of the General Directorate of Security building in the Turkish capital Ankara, injuring two police officers. The bomber's companion, who was also planning to blow himself up, was shot and killed by police before he could detonate his explosive. Prior to the attack, the perpetrators reportedly hijacked a vehicle in Kayseri and killed its driver before driving to Ankara. The PKK claimed responsibility for the attack.

== Background ==
The separatist Kurdistan Workers' Party (PKK) has waged an insurgency against the Turkish state since 1984 and is designated as a terrorist group by the Turkish government and other Western countries. The attack was the first to strike the Turkish capital since a bombing in March 2016 that was claimed by another separatist Kurdish group.

== Event ==
At around 09:30 TRT on 1 October 2023, a light commercial vehicle carrying two people arrived in front of the entrance gate of the General Directorate of Security of the Interior Ministry on Atatürk Boulevard in Ankara. Both occupants then emerged from the vehicle, with one of them throwing a small explosive at the building to distract security. His companion then opened fire at the guards at the compound’s gate before setting off a bomb strapped to his body, killing himself. The initial attacker then rushed towards the compound but was shot dead by police.

The explosion was followed by large flames and was heard several kilometres away. Security footage of the incident indicated that a guard tower at the gate was damaged.

== Casualties ==
Aside from killing the perpetrators, the attack injured two police officers. One was shot in the chest and another suffered shrapnel injuries in both legs and an eye from the explosion, but Interior Minister Ali Yerlikaya said their injuries were not life-threatening.

Turkish media reported that prior to their arrival, the attackers had hijacked the vehicle and shot and killed its driver, a 24-year old veterinarian who was driving in the countryside, in Kayseri, 260 kilometers (161 miles) south-east of Ankara, and dumped his body into a ditch by the side of the road.

== Response ==
Following the attack, police carried out at least two controlled explosions in the area after multiple suspicious packages and bags were found. Television footage showed a rocket launcher lying near the attackers' vehicle. Investigators also recovered four guns, three hand grenades, and C-4 explosives. The Ankara prosecutor's office opened an investigation and ordered the closure of the area. Turkish media was asked to stop broadcasting images from the area where the attack occurred. Authorities also reviewed security footage taken from Kayseri to the Syrian border to determine the origin of the attackers.

On 4 October, Foreign Minister Hakan Fidan announced that the attackers came from Syria and were trained there.

== Responsibility ==
The PKK claimed responsibility for the bombing, saying that the perpetrators belonged to its Immortal Brigade. Ahmet Keser, head of Political Science and International Relations at Hasan Kalyoncu University in Gaziantep, said the attack was “a very well-organised terrorist incident” aimed to influence the Turkish parliament's decision on whether to accept Sweden's application to join the North Atlantic Treaty Organization (NATO) in its autumn session.

== Reactions ==
The bombing occurred hours before the Grand National Assembly of Turkey was set to open its autumn session in its building nearby. The opening ceremony went ahead as scheduled in the afternoon, with President Recep Tayyip Erdoğan addressing the body. He called the attack "the last stand of terrorism" and referred to the perpetrators as "villains who threaten the peace and security of citizens" who failed to achieve "their objectives and will never achieve them". Leader of the Opposition Kemal Kılıçdaroğlu condemned the bombing, calling it a “terrorist attack” and vowed that Turkey would be united in fighting any such assaults from any source.

Justice Minister Yılmaz Tunç said the bombing would “in no way hinder Turkey’s fight against terrorism".

== Aftermath ==
Following the PKK's claim of responsibility for the attack, the Turkish military launched airstrikes on PKK positions in northern Iraq, with the Turkish Defence Ministry claiming to have destroyed around 20 targets. The Kurdish news agency Rudaw said the strikes occurred at Mount Qandil near the Iranian border. Airstrikes were also reported in Gara, Hakurk, and Metina. The Turkish military conducted another round of airstrikes on 3 October, with the Defence Ministry claiming to have struck 16 PKK targets in the Metina, Gara, Hakurk, Qandil and Asos regions of northern Iraq. It also conducted airstrikes on territory held by Kurdish rebel groups in northern Syria on 5 October, reportedly killing eight people, and on 6 October. During these strikes, a US F-16 fighter jet destroyed a Turkish drone flying near US forces in the region of Al-Hasakah, Syria.

On 3 October, Turkish police launched a series of raids across 64 provinces that led to the detention of at least 928 people for possession of illegal weapons and 90 others suspected of being members of the PKK and the recovery of more than 1,000 illegal arms. The operation was centered in Şanlıurfa and involved about 13,400 security personnel.

== See also ==
- 2024 Turkish Aerospace Industries headquarters attack
- List of suicide attacks in Turkey
- List of terrorist incidents in 2023
- Terrorism in Turkey
