= June 2023 Northeastern Syria clashes =

- Part of Syrian civil war
Date	10–14 June 2023 (4 days)
Location	Aleppo and Hasakah Governorates, Northern Syria

Belligerents
Turkey	Autonomous Administration of North and East Syria; Syrian Arab Republic; Russia

Units involved
Turkish Armed Forces: Turkish Air Force; Turkish Land Forces	Syrian Democratic Forces: People's Protection Units (YPG); Manbij Military Council; Syrian Armed Forces: Syrian Army; Russia: Russian Ground Forces

Casualties and losses
(Turkey) None	20 killed, 10 wounded (Syria) 8 killed, 11 wounded (Russia) 1 killed, 4 wounded
- 1 civilian killed, 8 injured

Starting on 10 June 2023, Turkish Armed Forces launched a campaign of air and ground strikes targeting the Syrian Democratic Forces and the Syrian Army in Northern Syria. On 13 June, the Kurdistan Communities Union announced the suspension of the unilateral ceasefire it had imposed following the 2023 Turkey–Syria earthquake. The Turkish strikes have also extended to Russian Armed Forces in Syria, killing a Russian soldier and injuring 4 others.

== Clashes ==
On 10 June, a Turkish drone strike on a car killed three SDF fighters, including a commander, and injured two others in the town of Ahdas in northern Aleppo province.

On 11 June, rockets launched from Kurdish and Syrian Government held territory struck two Turkish bases in northern Aleppo, without causing any casualties.

On 12 June, a Russian soldier was killed and four others were seriously injured after their vehicle was struck by Turkish artillery on the road linking Herbel with Maarat Umm Hawsh in northern Aleppo. Later in the day, two SDF fighters were killed and five civilians were injured after a Turkish drone strike in the town of Kobani.

On 13 June, three Syrian soldiers were killed by Turkish artillery shelling near the town of Oqayba, while a Turkish drone strike destroyed a Syrian Army tank and injured three soldiers near the town of Bailoniya on the same day. In the Manbij countryside, two SDF fighters were killed and three others were wounded by two separate Turkish drone strikes.

On 14 June, a Turkish drone strike killed five Syrian soldiers and injured six others near the town of Tell Rifaat, while two others were injured by artillery shelling. On the same day Turkish drone strikes and artillery shelling near the villages of Oqayba, Dandaniya and Al-Sayad killed nine SDF fighters and injured two others, while a separate drone attack targeted a car travelling on the Qamishli-al-Malikiyah road killing four SDF fighters and injuring three others.

== Aftermath ==
On 19 June, the Syrian Army deployed reinforcements, including tanks, artillery, and hundreds of troops from the Republican Guard, to the towns of Manbij and Arima.

== Reactions ==
Turkey: Turkey's Defense Ministry released a statement saying it had launched a large scale operation in response to the shelling of Turkish territory and that it had "neutralized" 41 terrorists.

AANES: Kurdistan Communities Union (KCK), announced the termination of the unilateral ceasefire it had declared due to escalating attacks by Turkey.

== See also ==
- Operation Claw-Sword
- Timeline of the Syrian civil war (2023)
