= As-Sawra al-Kabira =

As-Sawra al-Kabira الصورة الكبيرة
- Village
- Location in Syria
- Coordinates: 33°7′55.48″N 36°31′32.4″E
- Country: Syria
- Governorate: Suwayda
- District: Shahba
- Subdistrict: Sawra as-Saghira

Population (2004)
  - Total: 885
- Time zone: UTC+2 (EET)
  - Summer (DST): +3

As-Sawra al-Kabira (Arabic: الصورة الكبيرة) is a village situated in the Shahba District of Suwayda Governorate, in southern Syria. According to the Syria Central Bureau of Statistics (CBS), As-Sawra al-Kabira had a population of 885 in the 2004 census. Its inhabitants are predominantly Druze, with a Christian minority.

== Civil war ==
On the evening on 30 April 2025, armed groups attacked Druze-majority villages of Ira, Rasas, and As-Sawra al-Kabira, and shelled Kanaker in Suwayda Governorate and clashed with local Druze armed groups. Syrian government forces were soon after deployed to the area to restore stability. The attackers were later reportedly identified to be linked to the Syrian Ministry of Defense.

In As-Sawra al-Kabira, the shrine and museum of Issam Zahreddine, a late Druze military officer and former commander of the Syrian Republican Guard who had a poor reputation as part of the Ba'athist regime's forces, was burned and destroyed by unknown attackers, the building was eventually blown up.

During the southern Syria clashes in July 2025, the Mar Mikhael Church in the village was robbed, vandalized, and burned by members of the Defence and Interior Ministries, along with armed Bedouin men.

== Demographics ==
In 2011, the Melkite Greek Catholic Church had approximately 2,500 believers.

== Religious buildings ==
- Mar Mikhael (St. Michael) Melkite Greek Catholic Church
- Maqam al-Khidr (Druze Shrine)

== See also ==
- Druze in Syria
- Christians in Syria
