= 2023 Turkish drone shootdown =

Drone shootdown in Syria

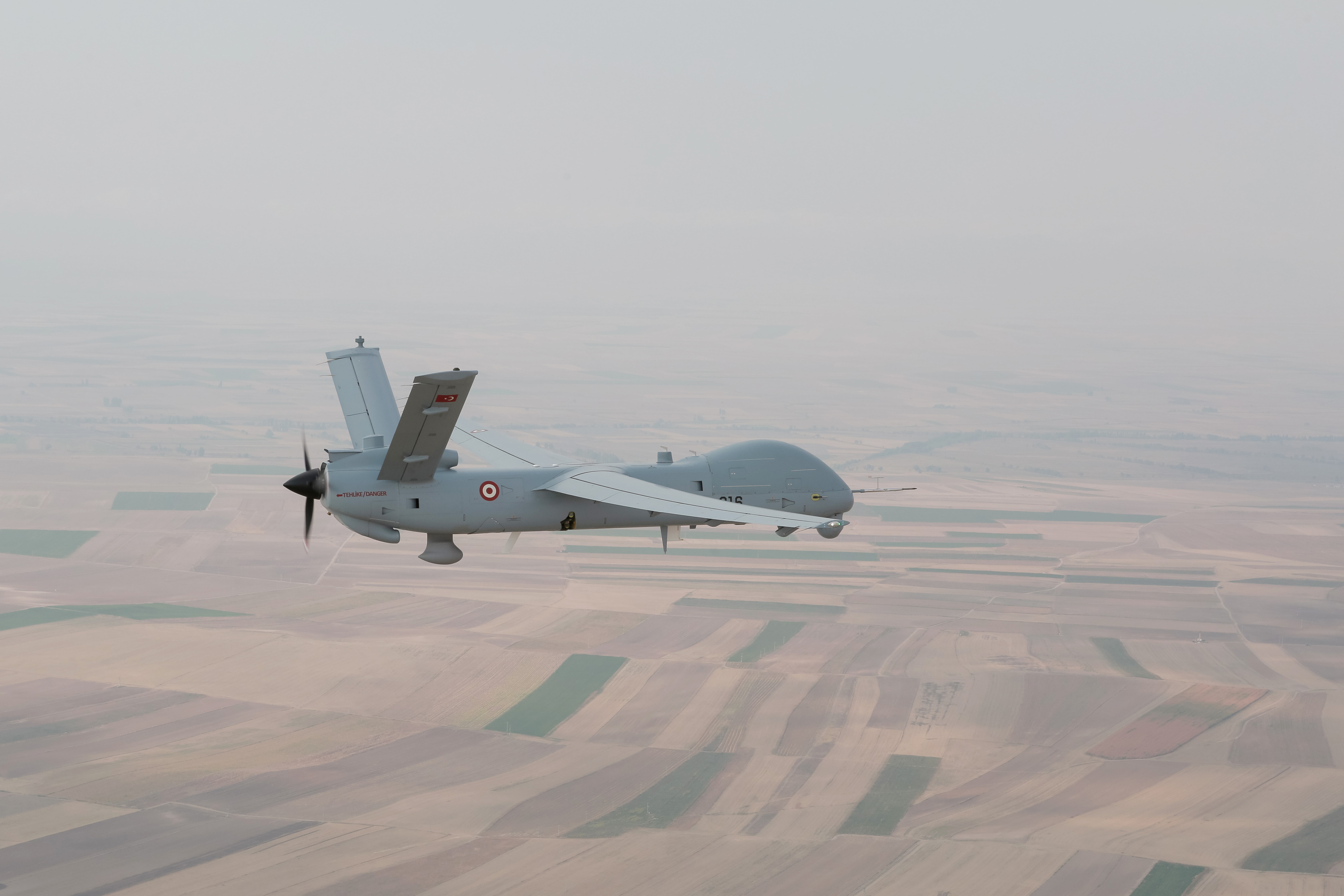
- TAI Anka-S drone of the Turkish Air Force

Shootdown
- Date: 5 October 2023
- Summary: Shot-down by a US F-16
- Site: Near Tell Beydar, Hasakah Governorate, Syria

On 5 October 2023, at approximately 11:30 AM local time, a Turkish combat drone was shot down by a United States Air Force F-16 near US forces in the Al-Hasakah region of Syria.

== Background ==
Turkey has frequently criticized the United States for providing aid to the Kurdish YPG in Syria, which Turkey views as a terrorist organization allied with the outlawed PKK. Following the 2023 Ankara bombing, Turkey began to launch airstrikes on targets in the SDF-controlled zones of Syria. Turkey has stated that a ground operation in Kurdish-controlled zones of Syria is an option that it could consider in retaliation for the 2023 Ankara bombing.

== Events ==
According to US officials cited by Politico, a Turkish Bayraktar TB2 drone was being used in Syria near the position of US troops. The United States attempted to contact Turkey a dozen times to warn them, but to no avail. They then resolved to shoot down the drone using an F-16. The US claimed that the drone had been flying in an "unsynchronized" and "unsafe" way. The Syrian Observatory for Human Rights and local sources confirmed that a Turkish drone was shot down by US forces.

In the vicinity of Al-Hasakah, Syria, several Turkish strikes occurred at 7:30 AM local time, with some of them inside a US-declared restricted operating zone. The drones were situated approximately one kilometer away from US forces, prompting them to relocate to bunkers. Later, at 11:30 AM local time, a Turkish drone initially identified as a Bayraktar TB2 breached the restricted operating zone once again. U.S. commanders evaluated the drone as a "possible threat," resulting in the F-16 shooting it down. The drone model of the combat drone was identified as a TAI Anka-S drone afterwards in more precise reports.

== Aftermath ==
Turkey's Defense Minister denied that the drone was of Turkish origin but did not provide an explanation about its source. The Pentagon stated that the shooting down of the drone was a "regrettable incident" and that it was done in self-defense. The Defense Ministers of both the United States and Turkey held a call together to discuss the matter. According to the Turkish Defence Minister, the US F-16 that destroyed the drone took off from Jordan and not from the US base at Incirlik, Turkey.

On 10 October, Recep Tayyip Erdogan, the president of Turkey, said :

"The US downed Türkiye's UAV in Syria. Isn't Türkiye US' NATO ally? How do we make sense of this? The US acts like a partner whenever it wants to but trains terrorist groups in Syria at other times."

He also said that Turkey would do what is "necessary" after this act.
