= Southern Syria protests (2023–24) =

Druze led Protests in Syria

2023–2024 southern Syria protests
- Part of the Syrian revolution and the Syrian civil war
- Date: 17 August 2023 – 8 December 2024 (1 year, 3 months and 3 weeks)
- Location: Mainly As-Suwaida and Daraa regions, with minor anti-government protests across Syria
- Caused by: Totalitarian rule of Bashar al-Assad, economic crisis, corruption, high inflation and state repression
- Goals: Resignation of President Bashar al-Assad; Implementing Security Council resolution 2254; Toppling the Ba'athist government; Change of ruling system; Decentralization or federalization of Syria
- Methods: Demonstrations and general strikes
- Result: Syrian opposition victory: Southern Syrian opposition groups launch the 2024 Southern Syria offensive; Formation of the Southern Operations Room (SOR); SOR captures Daraa and Quneitra Protestors seize control of Suwayda city; Forces of SOR and Military Operations Command captures Damascus; Fall of the Assad regime; Establishment of Syrian transitional government

Parties
Druze protesters (Syrian opposition) Pro-Syrian oppposition protesters: 10th of August Movement	Ba'athist Syria

Number
Thousands of protestors in Suwayda Thousands of activists in government-controlled regions	

Casualties
- Death: 1 protester killed

On 17 August 2023, popular protests over the high inflation rate and deteriorating economic situation in Syria erupted in the Druze majority city of Al-Suwayda, with hundreds of participants. These grew, and by 20 August, thousands of protesters chanted slogans demanding the downfall of the Assad government. By 24 August, the protests had spread to the rest of the country, including the cities of Daraa, Latakia, Tartus, Deir ez-Zor, Al-Hasakah and Homs. By 25 August, the protests continued to spread to Aleppo and the capital city of Damascus.

On 28 February 2024 a man died of gunshot wounds sustained from the Syrian Armed Forces' response to his protest in Suwayda.

== Background ==
Map of reconciliation areas in Daraa governorate July 2018 – late February 2020

Daraa had been one of the main starting places of the Syrian revolution in 2011, and was largely under the control of the pro-opposition Free Syrian Army from 2012. Following the 2018 offensive that brought Daraa and Quneitra under control of the Syrian Arab Army, many rebels forces in the area signed Russian-brokered reconciliation deals, in which they laid down their weapons against the Syrian Army. The rebels also handed over their heavy weapons. Most rebels stayed behind, and continued to control various areas in the province, as well as the Al-Balad subdistrict of the city of Daraa. However, tensions continued between the government and the "reconciled" rebels. Conditions in the province were poor. Most people in Daraa live below the poverty line; the poor financial situation has led to high unemployment, especially among youth. Economic downturn and lack of security gave rise to crime and tribal justice, fueling the security chaos. In addition, forced conscription and arrests fueled anger against the Syrian government. The 2021 Daraa offensive saw renewed military fighting between armed locals and the SAA, eventually leading to a truce and fragile government control, but unrest has continued since.

As-Suwayda, in contrast, had been relatively peaceful in the civil war period. According to one analyst in 2018:

The majority of al-Suwayda residents are Druze, an esoteric religious group that has roughly one million adherents worldwide. Some locals are loyal to Damascus [the seat of government], others are sympathetic to the Syrian revolution, and a third category are neutral or avoid politics, but all are united in their opposition to allowing the war into their province.

However, there were waves of anti-government protest in the region during 2014 and 2015. In 2015, large-scale anti-government demonstrations took place across the region when Druze religious leader Wahid al-Balous got killed in a carbomb. Pro-Assad forces were widely blamed for the assassination. Further demonstrations erupted in 2020 and in 2022, including some violent protests in late 2022.

By 2023, the economy of Syria was in poor shape, exacerbated by hyperinflation, corruption, rising crime rates in government-held areas and international sanctions. The cost of living had become untenable for many households by the summer. The Syrian currency reached an unprecedented low of 15,000 Syrian pounds per US dollar on 15 August, down from 7,000 at the start of the year. The United Nations reported that 90% of the country's population lived in poverty, and that more than half suffered food insecurity.

The government doubled public sector salaries in August (to 85,940 Syrian pounds, worth $21.76 at the official exchange rate or $12.40 at the market rate), but increased fuel prices (to 8,000 Syrian pounds – $0.53 – per litre from 3,000 pounds, and fuel oil to 2,000 pounds per litre from 700 pounds) and had been reducing subsidies for necessities, such as heating and cooking fuel. The decision led to a rapid increase in inflation, further diminishing the purchasing capability of civilians, and deteriorated economic strength.

== 10th August movement and Druze general strike ==
There were scattered protests in the coastal region of Syria, traditionally more loyal to the government, through summer of 2023. In August, the 10th of August movement, a pan-Syrian protest movement, was launched in the coastal region, distributing thousands of pieces of paper with calls for an end to economic mismanagement and giving deadlines for pay rises and curbs on prices. Leaflets were distributed in Banias, Jableh, Tartous and Latakia (all places with significant Alawite populations), and the movement condemned violence and sectarianism. Many of the leaders of the 10th August movement are Alawite dissidents affiliated with the Syrian opposition. The movement's declared goals include clandestinely working to activate "political consciousness among the Syrian people" to achieve "critical mass of support" required to overthrow the Ba'athist government, by wooing elements of the military and secret police.

At the same time, a declaration was released by the "Free Alawite Officers", who said they were speaking from "the heart of the Syrian coast" and specifically from al-Kurdaha, the hometown of President al-Assad. There were some reports of protests against deteriorating living conditions on Wednesday 16 August. Taxi and bus drivers in Damascus staged two days of partial stoppages on 16–17 August.

A general strike was declared in Suweida on Thursday 17 August. Targeting the police headquarters and the governor's office, hundreds of protesters chanted anti-government slogans, such as "Long live Syria and down with Bashar al Assad!" In Daraa province, some villages participated in the strikes, with demonstrators raising the Syrian revolutionary flag and chanting, "Bashar … Go! We want to live!"

On Friday 18 August, there were demonstrations across southern Syria after Friday prayer. In many places, protests took the form of holding up and photographing slips of paper with anti-government slogans in front of iconic locations. Protests continued in Daraa province on Saturday 19 August; protestors outside the Umayyad Mosque in Daraa city waved the Syrian revolutionary flag.

Sheikh Hikmat al-Hijri, one of the Druze spiritual leaders, issued a statement on 19 August expressing concern about the economic situation and calling for action to achieve change and justice.

On Sunday 20 August, the general strike deepened. Roads were closed, and Suweida's Department of Education announced the postponement of scheduled exams at its Damascus University branch, with state media saying this was due to road closures.

== Protests ==
=== August ===
On 20 August 2023, a large number of protestors in Southern Syria began protesting against the Ba'athist government. Protests erupted first in Karama Square in the Druze-majority city of Suwayda. 42 protests were held across As-Suwayda governorate, and spread to the neighbouring province of Daraa, often known as the "Cradle of the Syrian Revolution", with protests in the Daraa villages Nawa, Jasem Sanamein and Da'el. Protestors in Suwayda waved Druze flags and Syrian revolutionary flags. They also chanted slogans of 2011 Syrian revolution, demanding the downfall of the Assad government and expulsion of Iranian presence from the country. Protestors led mass demonstrations, and sit-ins and blocked roads to the Baath party headquarters in Suweida.

There were reports of government forces shooting on unarmed protestors in the Nawa and Da'el districts of Daraa city on 20 August. There were reports the next day that night-time youth protests near a military security building in Nawa, during which roads were obstructed using burning tires, were followed by confrontations between local fighters and government forces who later shelled the area.

The Syrian Democratic Council expressed its support for the protests on 21 August.

On 22 August, there was a youth protest in the town of Sayda, to the east of Daraa, calling for "the ousting of the regime".

Protests continued on 23 August. Protestors had raided Ba'ath party offices across Southern Syria and blocked the highway connecting Suwayda to Damascus.

The numbers protesting in al-Karama square grew on 24 August, according to opposition media, with slogans including "Syria yearns for liberty, Bashar must step aside," "In the name of Syrian freedom, Iran, recede," "The people of Syria demand liberty," and "May Syria prosper, down with Bashar al-Assad." Banners called for the imposition of UN Resolution 2254. By 25 August, large-scale protests had spread to Idlib, Aleppo, Azaz, Afrin and Al-Bab regions.

By the second week of the protests, commentators had begun describing the country-wide protest waves as a second revolutionary movement. Security forces were deployed to initiate a clampdown on protests in Daraa, Aleppo, Latakia, etc. Due to the presence of armed Druze militias, such as the "Men of Dignity" group and Sheikh al-Karama Forces, the Assad government has been more hesitant to launch crackdowns in Suwayda. However, the Assad government's plans for an upcoming military crackdown were reported by opposition activists. Hundreds of protestors in Suwayda continued to chant anti-government slogans, demanding the overthrow of Bashar al-Assad.

On 28 August, video footage emerged of security forces shooting to suppress protests in Shahba city, Suweida region. The same day, hundreds of demonstrators gathered at the Karama Square; chanting revolutionary slogans and demanding the prosecution of Bashar al-Assad in an international tribunal. The protestors further labelled the dictator as "the criminal of the barrel bombs, sarin gas, and captagon". Protests demanding the ouster of the Assad government also continued in the Idlib and Daraa regions.

By late August, Ba'athist security forces had carried out a wave of arbitrary arrests and detentions across the country, particularly in the coastal regions where the 10th of August movement was amassing supporters. A spokesman of the 10th of August movement stated: "The regime is very good at using violence against people. We are trying to reach a point in Syrian society where we don't give them a chance once we decide to start a revolution".

On 29 August 2023, demonstrations and civil disobedience continued. Al-Karama square in As-Suwayda city saw its tenth consecutive day of protest. Villagers from across western As-Suwayda province gathered in Ariqa, and provincial roads were closed. In eastern As-Suwayda, Ba'ath party offices were closed in Melh. Around 57 protestors were arrested during the crackdown in Daraa. The headquarters of the Ba'ath party in Suweida were occupied and closed down by the protestors. Mass boycotts by residents in the city also led to the shutdown of government institutions. Demonstrations in the main square of Suwayda continued to be engulfed by anti-government slogans, such as: "Step down Bashar, we want to live in dignity".

Protestors in Suwayda raised slogans advocating solidarity with opposition-held regions in Idlib and other parts of North-Western Syria. Kurdish party PYD also supported the protests, advocating the establishment of federalization process in minority provinces. Demonstrators in Daraa raised slogans of "bread, freedom and dignity." On 30 August 2023, reports regarding the Assad government's preparation for a large-scale crackdown to quell the uprisings in Southern Syria began to emerge. By the end of August, the mass-protests resembled the Arab Spring uprisings during the outbreak of the Syrian revolution in March 2011.

On 31 August, clashes broke out in the Damascene country-side between local people and militants of Maher al-Assad's 4th Armoured Division in the town of Zakiyah. This was after a civilian, who discovered that some of the division's commanders bombed a store used for keeping water well machinery, was shot dead by pro-Assad militants. This sparked fierce confrontations between locals and the 4th Armoured Division, killing three militants of the division and two residents. Anti-Assad activities had been rising in Zakiyah since the eruption of protests across Syria, and Assad regime had deployed military troops across Rif Dimashq in August. Several houses of the 4th Armoured Division soldiers were burned down by angered locals.

=== September ===
Protests continued on 1 September 2023 across Suwayda and Daraa regions. Small-scale demonstrations also occurred in Tartus and other government-held regions. Thousands of protestors in Suwayda chanted anti-government slogans demanding the resignation of Bashar al-Assad, resulting in the largest anti-regime rallies since the Arab Spring in 2011. Demonstrators in Daraa waved the Syrian revolutionary flags.

Protest activities in southern Syria, especially in Suwayda province, escalated during the first week of September, with demonstrators prolonging their gatherings late into the night and establishing makeshift encampments with prominent banners. Protestors also disfigured a statue of Hafez al-Assad. Many protestors in opposition and SDF-held territories came out publicly in support of Suwayda residents. Protests in Daraa region also continued.

Noting that anti-regime sentiments have become rife in previously loyalist areas of Ba'ath party, director of Suweyda24 news-outlet Nour Radwan stated: "In the areas where the regime has full-control, people are always watching us. People are really waiting to protest, but they are still scared of the security forces".

=== October to December ===
On 28 November protesters demanded the closure of a Baath party office in As-Suwayda.

On 22 December protests took place in Al-Karama Square of As-Suwayda.

=== February 2024 ===
On 28 February 2024, one protester was killed by government forces, the first death in 6 months of anti-government protests.

=== March 2024 ===
On March 8, demonstrators showcased banners acknowledging the vital contributions of women to the revolution.

== See also ==
- Timeline of the Syrian civil war (2023)
- Syrian protests (2016)
- Southern Syria offensive (2024)
