= Hikmat al-Hijri =

Spiritual leader of the Druze community in Syria

Sheikh Hikmat Salman al-Hijri
- حكمت سلمان الهجري
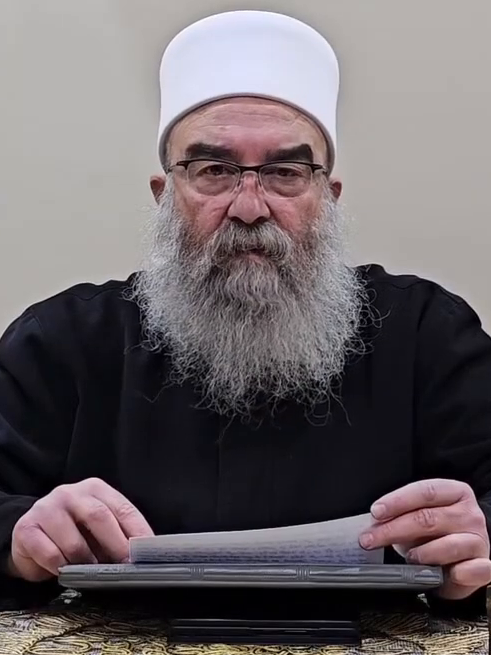
- Al-Hijri in 2024

Leader of the Administrative Council of Jabal Bashan
- Incumbent
- Assumed office 7 April 2026
- Preceded by: Office established (Himself as Head of the Supreme Legal Committee in Suwayda)

Leader of the Supreme Legal Committee in Suwayda
- In office 26 July 2025 – 7 April 2026
- Preceded by: Office established
- Succeeded by: Office abolished (Himself as Head of the Administrative Council of Jabal Bashan)

Leader of the National Guard (Note: As Spiritual leader of the Syrian Druze Community.)
- Incumbent
- Assumed office 23 August 2025
- Preceded by: Office established

Spiritual leader of the Syrian Druze Community
- Incumbent
- Assumed office 2012 (Note: Spiritual leadership of the Druze in Syria is split into two since the 2010s, one is headed by Hikmat al-Hijri, the other is mutually headed by Hammoud al-Hinnawi and Youssef Jarbou.)
- Preceded by: Ahmed al-Hijri

Personal life
- Born: 9 June 1965 (age 61) Venezuela
- Occupation: Spiritual leader of the Druze community in Syria
- Relations: Ahmed al-Hijri (brother)

Religious life
- Religion: Druze

Hikmat Salman al-Hijri (Note: Arabic: حكمت سلمان الهجري) (born 9 June 1965) is a Syrian spiritual leader who is one of three sheikhs of the Druze community in Syria and a prominent religious and social figure in Suwayda Governorate. He is an opposition figure to the Syrian transitional government.

== Early life ==
Al-Hijri was born on 9 June 1965 in Venezuela, where his father was working at the time. After the family's return to Syria, he completed his primary and secondary education there. In 1985, he studied law at Damascus University, from which he graduated in 1990.

== Spiritual and political leadership ==
In 2012, al-Hijri succeeded his brother Ahmed as the spiritual leader of the Druze community after the latter's suspicious death in a car accident. The position has been hereditary within the family since the 19th century. His tenure saw a split within the Druze religious leadership, with one faction under his leadership based in the town of Qanawat and another led by sheikhs Hammoud al-Hinnawi and Youssef Jarbou based at the Ain al-Zaman shrine in Suwayda city.

Initially, al-Hijri was known for his support of Bashar al-Assad, which led to a decline in his popularity within the Druze community. With the onset of the Syrian revolution, he faced pressure to take a clear stance against the regime, especially after security forces killed protesters. On 25 January 2021, he was insulted by regional Military Intelligence head Louay al-Ali during a phone call regarding a detained citizen from As-Suwayda. The incident sparked widespread outrage and protests in the region.

At a secret meeting with a Russian military delegation in April of the same year, al-Hijri rejected Assad's continuation in power, in order to prevent a slide toward partition, to ensure the return of displaced people, and to initiate reconstruction of the country.

Following the fall of the Assad regime on 8 December 2024, al-Hijri called for a comprehensive national dialogue under international supervision to establish a transitional government representing all segments of Syrian society. In a televised interview aired in January 2025, al-Hijri stressed that it was "far too early" to talk about disarming, considering the matter "completely unacceptable until a state is formed and a constitution is written to guarantee rights".

2025 VOA report about fears among Syrian minorities, with interview of al-Hijri

On 17 February 2025, al-Hijri issued a statement emphasizing the unity of Syria as a land and people, rejecting separatism and the reintegration of corrupt officials into state institutions. He called for a technocratic civilian administration free from ethnic, religious, or political affiliations and warned against losing the national direction following the fall of the regime.

Al-Hijri expressed mixed views on Syrian President Ahmed al-Sharaa. In a recorded statement in March 2025, he denied any political alignment with the Damascus government, saying that it was extremist and was wanted by international justice. He accused the authorities of attempting to sow discord in As-Suwayda by appointing unpopular figures to represent the governorate. He also refused to recognize the new constitutional declaration, calling it "illogical".

In July 2025, amid clashes between Druze and Bedouins, al-Hijri issued a statement warning government forces to not intervene in Suwayda. After government forces were deployed, he called on Druze fighters to "resist this brutal campaign by all available means." He later called on United States President Donald Trump, Israeli Prime Minister Benjamin Netanyahu, Saudi Crown Prince Mohammed bin Salman, and Jordan's King Abdullah II to "save Suwayda". On 16 July, the Syrian government announced a ceasefire, which was agreed to by the Druze Religious Authority, headed by other sheikhs Hammoud al-Hinnawi and Youssef Jarbou. Al-Hijri rejected the agreement however, saying that it was proclaimed by "armed gangs falsely calling themselves a government". Following the government's withdrawal, at least 50 Bedouin civilians were massacred by al-Hijri-aligned Druze groups, according to multiple reports. Al-Hijri refused the entry of a government delegation with aid into Suwayda on 20 July.

On 8 August 2025, speaking via video message at the "Unity of Position of the Components of North and East Syria" conference in al-Hasakah, al-Hijri endorsed a decentralized, pluralistic Syria, stressing solidarity between Druze, Alawites, Kurds, and others. He described diversity as a source of strength rather than division. Later that month, on 23 August, a number of armed groups in Suwayda issued statements declaring their merger under the umbrella of a "National Guard". According to their founding declaration, the move was intended to create "an organized and solid force entrusted with protecting the mountain and its people". The groups emphasized their "absolute commitment to the decisions of the spiritual leadership represented by Sheikh Hikmat al-Hijri", describing him as the legitimate representative of the Druze community in the mountain, referring to Jabal al-Druze.
