= Asbah =

Al-Asbah الأصبح
- Village
- Location within Syria
- Coordinates: 32°58′37″N 35°53′7″E
- Grid position: 224/241 PAL
- Country: Syria
- Governorate: Quneitra
- District: Quneitra
- Subdistrict: Khishniyah

Population (2004 census)
  - Total: 380
- Time zone: UTC+2 (EET)
  - Summer (DST): UTC+3 (EEST)

Al-Asbah (Arabic: الأصبح) is a village in southern Syria, administratively part of the Quneitra Governorate, located west of Quneitra. According to the Syria Central Bureau of Statistics, Asbah had a population of 380 in the 2004 census. Its inhabitants are part of the Nu'aym, an Arab tribe based in the Golan Heights but with a presence in several parts of Syria.

== History ==
Transhumance shaped settlement in the Golan for centuries because of its harsh winters. The winters "forced tribespeople until the 19th century to live in hundreds of rudimentary 'winter villages' in their tribal territory. Starting in the second part of the 19th century, settlement in villages like al-Asbah became "fixed and formed the nucleus of fully sedentary life in the 20th century Golan."

In 1966, Asbah was administratively separated from the adjacent village of al-Asha, attaining its own village status. Both villages and others in the vicinity, including al-Rafid, Ghadir al-Bustan, Kudna, al-Muallaqa and Saida, were inhabited by the Nu'aym, a Bedouin tribe established in the Golan (Jawlan) and surrounding regions since at least the 16th century.

During the 1967 Arab-Israeli war, most of the Golan was captured and occupied by Israel. Asbah was depopulated and the village razed by the Israelis. Following the 1973 Arab-Israeli war, Israel and Syria entered a 1974 disengagement agreement, which saw Israel withdraw from a demilitarized strip of territory, which included the site of Asbah. The Syrian government thereafter established housing projects in Asbah and several of the other villages restored to Syrian control to encourage their refugees' return. While some villagers returned, many remained in Damascus, where they had since found employment as laborers, artisans, merchants and professionals. In contrast, there were little prospects for permanent work in Asbah and the Golan villages. The returnees engaged in farming, mostly olives and other fruit orchards, and livestock raising.
