= Kudna, Syria =

Kudna كودنة
- Village
- Location within Syria
- Coordinates: 33°0′25″N 35°53′19″E
- Grid position: 224/241 PAL
- Country: Syria
- Governorate: Quneitra
- District: Quneitra
- Subdistrict: Khishniyah

Population (2004 census)
  - Total: 1,857
- Time zone: UTC+2 (EET)
  - Summer (DST): UTC+3 (EEST)

Kudna (Arabic: كودنة, also transliterated Kodneh, Kudnah, Kodana) is a village in southern Syria, administratively part of the Quneitra Governorate, located south of Quneitra in the Syrian-controlled area of Golan Heights. According to the Syria Central Bureau of Statistics, Kudna had a population of 1,857 in the 2004 census.

The village appears as Rhadanos (Ῥαδανός) in the Diocletianic boundary stones corpus from c. 300 CE. Its modern name is Aramaic, and means "a mule".

Transhumance shaped settlement in the Golan for centuries because of its harsh winters. The winters "forced tribespeople until the 19th century to live in hundreds of rudimentary 'winter villages' in their tribal territory. Starting in the second part of the 19th century, villages became "fixed and formed the nucleus of fully sedentary life in the 20th century Golan." Specifically, Kudna is the traditional headquarters of the Nu'aym, a large Arab tribe mainly based in southern Syria. Historically, Kudna was a well-known pasture ground for the Arabian horses of the Nu'aym and their leading household, the Tahhan family.
