= Ghadir al-Bustan =

Ghadir al-Bustan غدير البستان
- Village
- Location within Syria
- Coordinates: 32°55′8″N 35°55′16″E
- Grid position: 224/241 PAL
- Country: Syria
- Governorate: Quneitra
- District: Quneitra
- Subdistrict: Khishniyah

Population (2004 census)
  - Total: 1,628
- Time zone: UTC+2 (EET)
  - Summer (DST): UTC+3 (EEST)

Ghadir al-Bustan (Arabic: غدير البستان) is a village in southern Syria, administratively part of the Quneitra Governorate, located west of Quneitra. According to the Syria Central Bureau of Statistics, Ghadir al-Bustan had a population of 1,628 in the 2004 census. Its inhabitants predominantly belong to the Nu'aym, an Arab tribe with a significant presence in southwestern Syria.

== History ==
Transhumance shaped settlement in the Golan region, where Ghadir al-Bustan is located, for centuries because of its harsh winters. The winters "forced tribespeople until the 19th century to live in hundreds of rudimentary 'winter villages' in their tribal territory. Starting in the second part of the 19th century, settlement in villages like Ghadir al-Bustan became "fixed and formed the nucleus of fully sedentary life in the 20th century Golan."

In 1884, American archaeologist Gottlieb Schumacher described Ghadir al-Bustan as a "deserted village" on the eastern bank of the Ruqqad river and the highest and northernmost point of the Golan proper with an elevation of 583 meters (1,913 ft). Most of its huts were used as storehouses and a few were inhabited. Ruins were scattered around the site and there were numerous springs and untended gardens.

On 15 January 2025, the Israeli Air Force struck and killed the mayor of Ghadir al-Bustan, Abdo al-Koma, and two officers of Syria's Public Security Directorate as they were traveling in a convoy in the village. The attack marked the first by Israeli against the Syrian transitional government authorities.

== Bibliography ==
- Schumacher, G. (1886). Across the Jordan: Being an Exploration and Survey of part of Hauran and Jaulan. London: Richard Bentley and Son.
