= Kipnis =

Kipnis or Kipniss is a Jewish surname. Dictionary of American Family Names suggests it is a corruption of the Ukrainian nickname "kyrponis, kyrponos" (Кирпоніс, Кирпонос) "flat-nosed", which produced the surname Kirponos.

Notable people with the surname include:

- Alexander Kipnis (1891–1978), Russian/Ukrainian/American operatic bass
- Igor Kipnis (1930–2002), German-born American harpsichordist and pianist
- Jason Kipnis (born 1987), American baseball player (second baseman; Chicago Cubs)
- Joel Kipnis (aka JK), producer, writer, soul/R&B guitarist, and recording studio owner
- Jonathan Kipnis, professor of pathology and immunology at the Washington University School of Medicine
- Laura Kipnis (born 1956), American professor of media studies at Northwestern University
- Levin Kipnis (1894–1990), Russian/Ukrainian-born Israeli children's author and poet; winner of the Israel Prize
- Jeff Kipnis (born 1951), American architectural critic, theorist, designer, film-maker, curator, and educator
- Menachem Kipnis (1878–1942), Polish singer, critic, and photographer
- Robert Kipniss (born 1931), American painter and printmaker
- Yigal Kipnis (born 1949), Israeli historian and author
