= Fiq, Syria =

Abandoned Syrian town in the Golan Heights

Fiq فيق
- Town
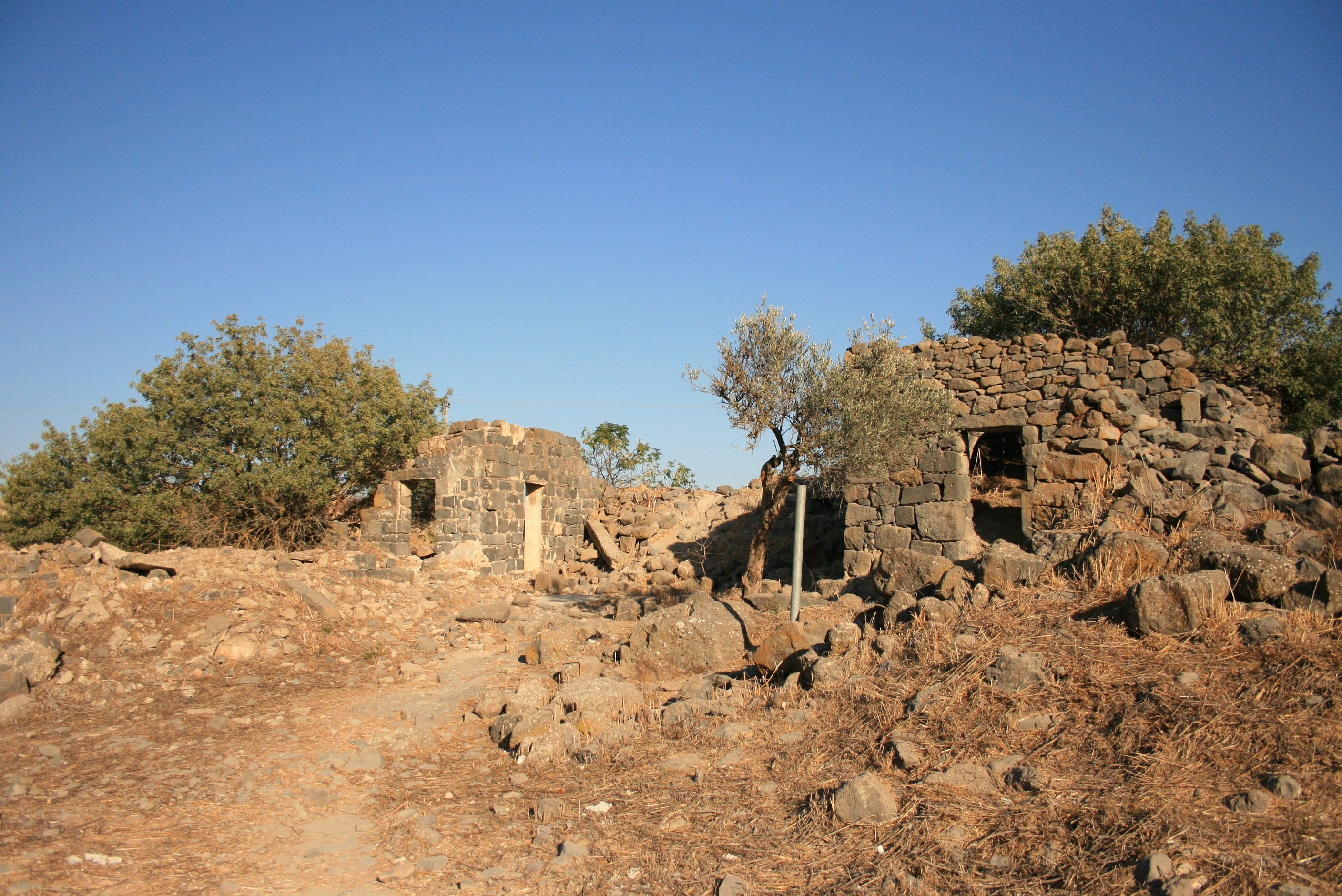
- Ruins at Fiq

- Location of Fiq in Syria
- Coordinates: 32°46′N 35°42′E
- Grid position: 215/241 PAL
- Country: Golan Heights, internationally recognised as Syrian territory occupied by Israel. See Status of the Golan Heights.
- Israeli District: Northern District
- Israeli Subdistrict: Golan
- Syrian Governorate: Quneitra Governorate
- Syrian District: Fiq District

Population (1967)
  - Total: 2,800
- Time zone: UTC+2 (IST)
  - Summer (DST): UTC+3 (IDT)

Fiq (Arabic: فيق) was a Syrian town in the Golan Heights that administratively belonged to Quneitra Governorate. It sat at an altitude of 349 meters (1,145 ft) and had a population of 2,800 in 1967. It was the administrative center of the Fiq District, the southern district of the Golan. Fiq was evacuated during and after the Six-Day War in June 1967. The Israeli settlement of Afik was built close by.

== History ==
Fiq was an ancient town covering about 100 dunams on a tell (archaeological mound). The surveys and limited excavations undertaken at the site have produced a small number of sherds from the Middle Bronze Age II, Hellenistic, and Middle Roman periods, whereas most of the finds were dated to the Byzantine, Umayyad, Abbasid and Mamluk periods.

=== Late antiquity ===
Fiq was identified by the 4th-century writer Eusebius with biblical Aphek.

During Late Antiquity, Fiq had a mixed population of Christians, Jews and pagans. Many inscriptions in Latin and Greek have been found at the site. One of these inscriptions may allude to a Psalm passage, and another, engraved on basalt and thought to have been a part of a church or chapel dedication, mentions a bishop, a presbyter, and a deacon. Jewish presence at Aphek is attested by Mishnaic and Talmudic sources.

One notable discovery from Fiq is a column adorned with a seven-branched menorah and bearing the inscription, "I am Judah the cantor," in Aramaic. It is thought that this column once stood in a local synagogue of the Byzantine period. After being discovered for the first time in Fiq during the 19th century, it vanished for several decades before being rediscovered by Israeli soldiers in a Syrian cemetery close to Quneitra. Today, it is on display at the Golan Archeological Museum.

=== Early Muslim period ===
9th-century historian Al-Baladhuri lists Aphek among the villages and forts captured during the Arab conquest in 638 CE. In the 11th century, Yaqut mentioned Aphek in his geography and lamented the fact that residents now called it "Fiq."

Fiq was located on one of the few routes connecting the Galilee and the Golan Heights, all part of the vital network of roads between Egypt and Syria. The lower part of the road followed the "Ascent of Fiq" (Arabic: 'Aqabat Fiq). Once it reached the plateau, the road passed through different villages, the branch going through Fiq leading eastwards to the Hauran region rather than northeastwards to Damascus.

An inscription found near Fiq dating to 692 credits the Umayyad caliph Abd al-Malik (r. 685–705) and his uncle Yahya ibn al-Hakam for levelling the "aqaba" (presumably Aqabat Fiq) for the inauguration of a new road connecting the Umayyad capital Damascus with Jerusalem. It is the oldest known Arabic inscription acknowledging the building of a road during the Islamic period.

=== Ayyubid period ===
The Ayyubids built a caravanserai at Aqabat Fiq in the early 13th century called Khan al-'Aqabah, whose ruins are still visible. Around 1225, during Ayyubid rule, the Syrian geographer Yaqut al-Hamawi noted that the convent of Dayr Fiq was much venerated by Christians and still frequented by travellers.

=== Ottoman period ===
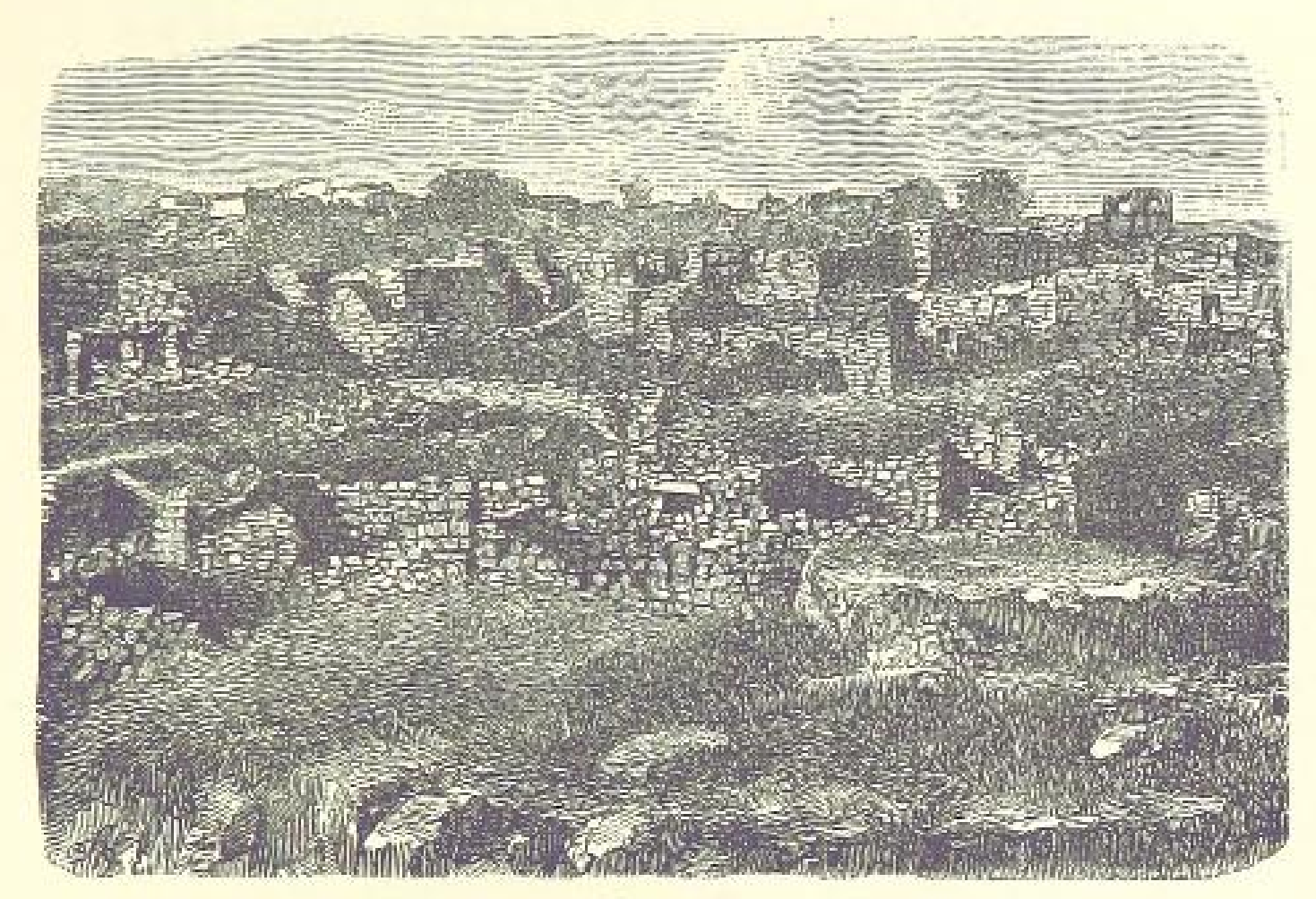
The village of Fiq in the 1880s

In 1596, Fiq appeared in the Ottoman tax registers as part of the nahiya of Jawlan Garbi in the Qada of Hauran. It had an entirely Muslim population consisting of 16 households and nine bachelors. Taxes were paid on wheat, barley, summer crops, olive trees, goats or beehives.

In 1806, the German explorer Seetzen found that Fiq had 100 houses made of basalt, four of them were inhabited by Christians and the rest by Muslims. In 1875, the French explorer Victor Guérin found that Fiq was divided into four quarters, each administered by its sheik. Most of the homes contained remnants of ancient buildings. The village had abundant fresh water. When Gottlieb Schumacher surveyed the area in the 1880s, he provided an extensive account of Fiq, worth quoting here at length:

large village of southern Jaulân, which till recently belonged to the Kada Tubarîya, but as the natives felt themselves thereby injured and in great part deserted it and settled in the environs, it was added to El-Kuneitrah, for which it is adapted by its situation. Fik, however, is scarcely more flourishing since that time.

Of the 160 standing and tolerably well-built stone houses, only about 90 are inhabited, containing scarcely 400 persons, the others are quickly going to ruin [...]. The place is raised on both sides.

The environs of Fik are very fertile; the stoneless high plateau is excellently suited for corn cultivation, but still great tracts lie completely fallow in the immediate neighbourhood of the village. The inhabitants also carry on bee culture.

About 220 yards from the most southern house one comes upon a hill covered with ruins and olive trees, which is marked as a former site by its remains of old columns and building stones.

At the present day the inhabitants of Fik bury their dead there, and with the object of honoring a Moslem tomb, call the place Jâmat el-'Umeri; perhaps a mosque stood there at one time. In the neighbourhood there is a second tomb, that of the Sheikh Faiyâd Abd el-Ghani: to each of these saints is entrusted a heap of firewood.

An old graveyard, with a longish hill called El-Mujjenneh, borders these places eastward. The Kusr el-'Ulliyeh lies in the south of the village, on the rising ground commanding the whole neighbourhood. It is a Moslem building, formerly destined for the reception of strangers, and, judging from the enceinte walls, was also fortified. At the time that Fik, according to the testimony of the natives, formed the central point of the land, Kusr was the seat of Government, the Serai.

=== 1967 war ===
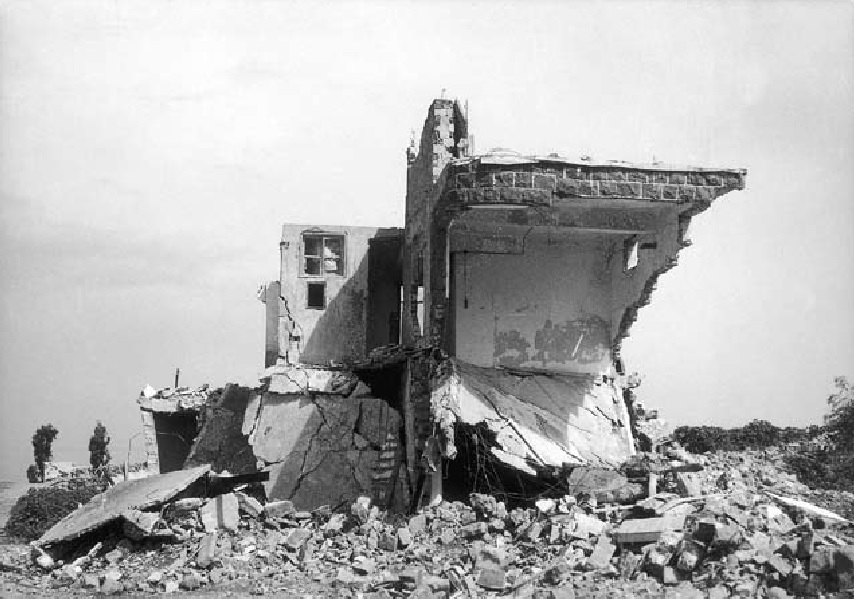
The demolition of a two-storied house in Fiq, 1967

At the time of its depopulation in 1967, the town had a population of approximately 2,800. After Israel occupied the area in the Six-Day War, they began destroying Syrian villages in the Golan Heights. Fiq was destroyed in 1967.

== Archaeology and possible mention in the Bible ==
The name Aphek refers to one or several locations mentioned by the Hebrew Bible as the scenes of several battles between the Israelites and the Arameans. Most famously, a town near which one or more rulers of Damascus named Ben-hadad, were defeated by the Israelites and in which the Damascene king and his surviving soldiers found a safe place of retreat (1 Kings 20:26–30; 2 Kings 13:17, 24-25).

Since the turn of the 20th century, the predominant opinion is that the location of all these battles is the same and that the town lies east of the Jordan. Initially, it was thought that the name is preserved in the now depopulated village of Fiq near Kibbutz Afik, three miles east of the Sea of Galilee, where an ancient mound, Tel Soreg, had been identified. Excavations by Moshe Kochavi and Pirhiya Beck in 1987-88 have indeed discovered a fortified 9th- and 8th-century BCE settlement, probably Aramean, but Kochavi considered it to be too small to serve the role ascribed to Aphek in the Bible.

== Notable people ==
- Hatem Ali, Syrian actor born in Fiq in 1962
- Hussein al-Sharaa, Syrian economist and Arab nationalist activist, father of the current President of Syria, Ahmed al-Sharaa

== Bibliography ==
- Dauphin, C. (1998). La Palestine byzantine, Peuplement et Populations. BAR International Series 726 (in French). Vol. III: Catalogue. Oxford: Archeopress.
- Davis, U. (1983), "The Golan Heights under Israeli occupation 1967-1981" (PDF), Occasional Papers Series, 18, Centre for Middle Eastern and Islamic Studies, Durham University, ISSN 0307-0654
- Guérin, V. (1880). Description Géographique Historique et Archéologique de la Palestine (in French). Vol. 3: Galilee, pt. 1. Paris: L'Imprimerie Nationale.
- Hasegawa, Shuichi (2012). "Aram and Israel during the Jehuite Dynasty: Tel Soreg". Beihefte zur Zeitschrift für die alttestamentliche Wissenschaft. 434. Berlin: Walter de Gruyter: 72. ISBN 9783110283488.
- Hütteroth, W.-D.; Abdulfattah, K. (1977). Historical Geography of Palestine, Transjordan and Southern Syria in the Late 16th Century. Erlanger Geographische Arbeiten. Vol. Sonderband 5. Erlangen: de:Fränkische Geographische Gesellschaft. ISBN 3-920405-41-2.
- Kipnis, Yigal (2013). The Golan Heights. London and New York: Routledge. p. 244.
- Le Strange, G. (1890). Palestine Under the Moslems: A Description of Syria and the Holy Land from A.D. 650 to 1500. Committee of the Palestine Exploration Fund.
- Negev, A.; Gibson, S., eds. (2001). Archaeological Encyclopedia of the Holy Land. New York and London: Continuum. p. 39. ISBN 0-8264-1316-1.
- Pringle, D. (2009). The Churches of the Crusader Kingdom of Jerusalem: Volume IV The cities of Acre and Tyre with Addenda and Corrigenda to Volumes I-III. Cambridge University Press. ISBN 978-0-521-85148-0. (pp. 240–241)
- Schumacher, G. (1888). The Jaulân: Surveyed for the German Society for the Exploration of the Holy Land. Cambridge University Press. ISBN 9781108017565.
- Seetzen, U.J. (1854). Fr. Kruse (ed.). Reisen durch Syrien, Palästina, Phönicien, die Transjordan-Länder, Arabia Petraea and Unter-Aegypten. Vol. 1. Berlin: G. Reimer. p. 353.
- Sharon, M. (2004). Corpus Inscriptionum Arabicarum Palaestinae, Vol. III, D-F. Brill. ISBN 9004131973. (p. 206)
- Sharon, M. (2007). Corpus Inscriptionum Arabicarum Palaestinae, Addendum. Brill. ISBN 978-9004157804. (p. 93)
- Sulimani, Gideon; Kletter, Raz (2022). "Settler-Colonialism and the Diary of an Israeli Settler in the Golan Heights: The Notebooks of Izhaki Gal". Journal of Holy Land and Palestine Studies. 21 (1). Edinburgh University Press. doi:10.3366/hlps.2022.0283. ISSN 2054-1988.
- Urman, Dan; Flesher, Paul Virgil McCracken (1998). Ancient Synagogues: Historical Analysis and Archaeological Discovery. Leiden: Brill Publishers. ISBN 978-90-04-11254-4. OCLC 42882859.
