= Jabta Elhashab Subdistrict =

Jabta Elhashab خان أرنبة
- Town
- Location within Syria
- Coordinates: 33°13′32″N 35°49′54″E
- Grid position: 164/287
- Country: Syria
- Governorate: Quneitra
- District: Quneitra
- Subdistrict: Jabta Elhashab

Population (2004 census)
  - Total: 7,375
- Time zone: UTC+2 (EET)
  - Summer (DST): UTC+3 (EEST)

Jabta Elhashab Subdistrict is a Syrian nahiyah (subdistrict) that administratively belongs to Al Quneitra Governorate.
