= Mount Peres =

Mountain in the Golan Heights

- تل الفرس (in Arabic) הר פֶּרֶס (in Hebrew)
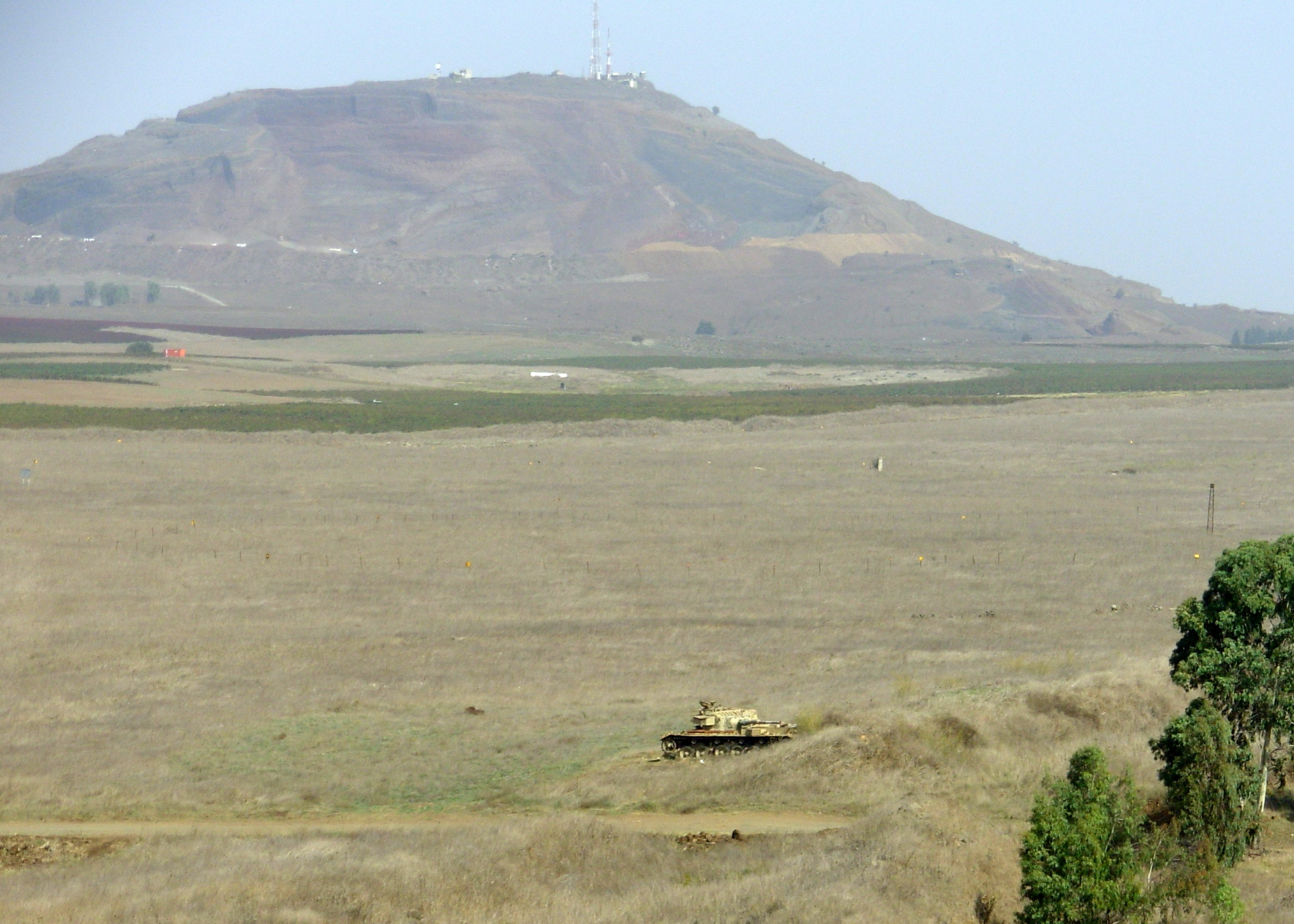

Highest point
- Elevation: 929 m (3,048 ft)
- Coordinates: 32°57′34″N 35°51′50″E

Geography
- Location within the Golan Heights
- Location: Golan Heights
- Parent range: Peres mountain range

Geology
- Mountain type: Volcano

Mount Peres (Arabic: تل الفرس, romanized: Tall al-Faras, Hebrew: הר פֶּרֶס, Har Peres) is a volcanic mountain in the central Golan Heights, within the Quneitra Governorate of Syria. It is located approximately 5.5 kilometres (3.4 mi) east of the Israeli settlement of Keshet. The area has been under Israeli military occupation since 1967.

Its highest point is 929 metres (3,048 ft) above sea level, or about 200 metres (660 ft) above ground level. The mountain is the southernmost of a series of dormant volcanoes that stretch up to the northern parts of the Quneitra Governorate. On top of the mountain is a well-preserved crater, 200 m (660 ft) in diameter and 35 m (115 ft) deep.
