= Nu'aym =

Arab tribal confederation in Syria

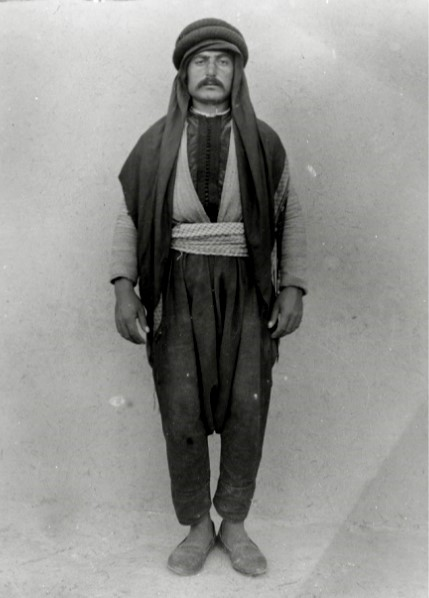
A Bedouin tribesman of the Nu'aym tribe in the Hauran, 1895

The Nu'aym (Arabic: بنو نعيم), also spelled Na'imeh, Na'im, Nu'im or Ne'im, are a large tribal confederation present in different parts of Syria. Their main concentration is in the Hauran and Golan Heights regions of southern Syria, with a significant presence in the suburbs of Damascus and the countryside of Homs, Idlib and Raqqa. The Nu'aym were one of the major Bedouin tribes in the plains around Homs and Hama and the Golan Heights throughout the Ottoman period.

== Locations ==
The Nu'aym have largely urbanized and are one of the four largest tribal groups in the governorates of Daraa and Quneitra in southern Syria. The three other largest tribal groups in the region, the Zu'bi, Hariri and Rifa'i (the first two are larger than the Nu'aym) are generally considered to have originally stemmed from the Nu'aym, though members of the Zu'bi and Hariri tribes are doubtful of the association.

The Nu'aym's area of settlement in southern Syria spans the region between Hamrit in the area formerly known as Wadi al-Ajam in the north to the Syrian border with Jordan in the south. They are the predominant demographic in the towns and villages of northwestern Daraa Governorate, namely the area between Shaykh Maskin and Nawa and Jasim in the Izra District and the north-central part of al-Sanamayn District, as well the abutting Quneitra Governorate to the west. Among their settlements in the Quneitra Governorate, which spans the Golan Heights, are al-Rafid, Kudna, al-Muallaqa, al-Qasibah, al-Asbah, al-Asha, Saida, Ghadir al-Bustan, al-Amudiyah, al-Mushrifah, Sabta and Batmiyah. Several other villages occupied by the Banu Nu'aym in the central and southern Golan Heights were depopulated by Israel when it occupied most of the territory in the 1967 Arab-Israeli war.

A significant part of the tribe lives in villages in the plains around Homs in central Syria, particularly the branches of Nasif and al-Sayyid, as well as the area between Homs, Palmyra and al-Sukhna. A segment of the Nu'aym lives in the Wadi Khaled area in the northern Beqaa Valley, where they are known as the 'al-Attiq'. The Nu'aym also has a significant presence in the countryside of Idlib.

The Nu'aym are one of the major tribes in the Raqqa Governorate, numbering some 15,000 and concentrated in the Tell Abyad region near the Turkish border. According to the tribe's oral traditions, this region, historically centered around Urfa in modern Turkey, was the point from which the rest of the tribe in Syria originally stemmed after having migrated there from Iraq.

== Branches ==
The Nu'aym is split between the Nu'aym of the Golan, which has a paramount sheikh (from the Tahhan family) and three subdivisions, including the Abunami; the Nu'aym of Homs, which has a paramount sheikh (from the Nasif family) and five subdivisions; and the Nu'aym of the Ghouta countryside of Damascus, which had no leading sheikh and consists of four subdivisions. Several members of the Nu'aym also currently live as Syrian expatriates in Saudi Arabia, Kuwait and the northern emirates of the United Arab Emirates. The Nu'aym of southern Syria (the Golan and Hauran) consists of eight main branches, each divided into several clans. The main branches are al-Tahhan, al-Othman, al-Dhiyab, al-Zabban, al-Madha, al-Khurfan, al-Sultan and al-Darwish.

== History ==
=== Ottoman period ===
According to the Nu'aym's oral tradition, the tribe first settled in the Golan Heights area in the 15th century, during Mamluk rule (1260s–1517). Their traditions hold the tribe had originally dwelt in northern Syria but dispersed to different areas of Syria following conflicts with the Mawali, the dominant tribe of the Syrian steppe throughout the Mamluk and early Ottoman periods (1517–1918). In 16th-century Ottoman tax records, the Nu'aym were recorded as the dominant tribe among the 1,122 Bedouin households in the Lajat lava field of the Hauran, east of the Golan. They also accounted for 51 and 120 households in the nahiya (subdistrict) of al-Hula adjacent to the Golan in 1523 and 1543, respectively. The Nu'aym were the second largest Arab tribe recorded in the Beqaa Valley in 1551, accounting for 76 households.

In the late 18th century, the Nu'aym numbered some 10,000 members and their roaming area extended between Homs and Damascus. The tribe was raided in the Hauran in the early 1770s by Sheikh Zahir al-Umar, the practically autonomous Arab ruler of northern Palestine. During the 18th and 19th centuries, the Nu'aym and Al Fadl tribes grazed their flocks of sheep in the Golan.

In the early 19th century, the Nu'aym of central Syria were the largest Arab tribe of the Homs Sanjak and may have been the largest tribe registered with the Hama Sanjak, where they consisted of the Nu'aym 'proper' and five or six associated tribes, collectively responsible for paying over 25% of the taxes owed by the Arab tribes of Hama. In the mid-19th century, during the latter years of Egyptian rule (1831–1841), tribesmen of the Nu'aym, as well as the Mawali and Uqaydat, were the principle settlers of the villages being reestablished east of Hama and Homs, on the desert fringe. Among those villages were Abu Imama, al-Khusaymiyya and Izz al-Din. The last is popularly held to be the burial place of the Nu'aym's purported common ancestor, Izz al-Din al-Hamra, for whom the village was named.

In the 1883 Ottoman salname, the Nu'aym were recorded to have around 2,000 men. In 1884, the German archaeologist Gottlieb Schumacher visited the Golan region and noted that the Nu'aym were "a large wealthy Bedawin tribe" spread across the eastern Golan and the northern Hauran up to Nawa. In the Golan they numbered 280 tents and were headquartered (in the summers) at Tell al-Faras (vicinity of Kudna). In addition, a small branch of the tribe, the Sabarjah, had 25 tents near Ramthaniyya. Schumacher's count was evidently limited to the Nu'aym tribesmen in the Golan, excluding those living in the adjacent Hauran plain. The Nu'aym's main pastures at Tell al-Faras were abundant in springs for their large cattle herds. At the time, the tribe were being pushed eastwards from these pastures by the provincial authorities in Damascus, which sought to utilize those tracts for their own livestock and distributed the remaining tracts to recently established Circassian settlers. Schumacher lauded the Nu'aym as the Golan's "best Bedawin tribe", noting that they were "peacefully disposed, and friendly to strangers, and indulgent" to the Wasiyya Bedouins, a smaller tribe which grazed its flocks in the Nu'aym's pasture grounds. Their tribal mark consisted of a ring in between two strokes, representing lances, which symbolized the tribe's trucial status.

=== Modern era ===
The Ottomans were driven out of Syria by the British-backed Sharifian army of Emir Faisal in 1918. When the French began occupying parts of Syria around that time, the Nu'aym chief Abdullah al-Tahhan at the head of the Arabs in the eastern Golan Heights threw their support behind Faisal. The latter's forces were defeated at the Battle of Maysalun and soon after Abdullah al-Tahhan was sentenced to death and went into exile in Transjordan. He and the emir of the other major Golan tribe Al Fadl, Mahmoud al-Faour, were pardoned by the French Mandatory authorities and returned to Syria.

In the mid-20th century, the Nu'aym were estimated to have about 25,000 members in Syria. Those in southern Syria included a mix of farmers and semi-nomadic cattlemen. The tribesmen sold their dairy products and oak-based charcoal to the markets of Damascus. The leader of the Na'im of southern Syria, Sheikh Abdul Razzaq al-Tahhan, was elected the Quneitra District's representative in the Syrian Parliament in 1954. He was succeeded by his relative Abdul Karim al-Tahhan in 1958, when Syria became part of the United Arab Republic, before Abdul Razzaq returned to office in 1961, when Syria seceded from the union. In 1972, another leader of the clan, Sheikh Saleh al-Tahhan, won Quneitra's seat and remained in office until 1990, when he was succeeded by clan leader Radwan al-Tahhan. In 2004, the seat was occupied by Nasr al-Din Khairallah, who won a second term and was Quneitra's representative at least until 2010.

After Israel occupied the Golan Heights during the 1967 Arab-Israeli War, the Nu'aym living in the territory's central and southern parts were displaced and their villages razed. As a result, the bulk of the tribe relocated to the nearby Daraa and Rural Damascus governorates and the suburbs of Damascus city. After the 1973 Arab-Israeli War, part of the Nu'aym's villages in and just east of the buffer zone, namely al-Rafid, al-Asbah, al-Asha and Saida, were restored and some of the tribesmen resettled there. As of 2010, they mostly engaged in agriculture, cultivating olives and other fruit orchards, in particular, and livestock raising. Part of the tribe's lands remain under Israeli occupation west of the buffer zone. They have close ties with the Al Fadl, with whom they have coexisted in the Golan since at least the 18th century.

The tribe lacked influence during the presidency of Hafez al-Assad (1971–2000), partly due to internal divisions. During the Syrian civil war, which began in 2011–2012, the leader of the Nu'aym in the Homs region, Mohammed Sfouk Nasif, a member of the Syrian Parliament, defected to the Syrian opposition and went into exile in Saudi Arabia. The supreme commander of the Free Syrian Army's Southern Front, Brigadier-General Abdel-Illah al-Bashir and Colonel Abdo Na'imeh, belonged to the tribe. The Nu'aym's chief in southern Syria, Radwan Tahhan, a longtime Syrian parliamentarian, played a prominent role mediating reconciliation agreements between the government and Syrian rebels in the Quneitra and rural Damascus regions.

== Bibliography ==
- Bakhit, Muhammad Adnan Salamah (February 1972). The Ottoman Province of Damascus in the Sixteenth Century (PhD). School of Oriental and African Studies, University of London.
- Chatty, Dawn (2010). Displacement and Dispossession in the Modern Middle East. New York: Cambridge University Press. pp. 112–114. ISBN 978-0-521-81792-9.
- Douwes, Dick (2000). The Ottomans in Syria: A History of Justice and Oppression. I.B. Tauris. ISBN 1860640311.
- Dukhan, Haian (2019). State and Tribes in Syria: Informal Alliances and Conflict Patterns. Abingdon and New York: Routledge. ISBN 978-1-351-02542-3.
- Patai, Raphael (1969) [1967]. Golden River to Golden Road: Society, Culture, and Change in the Middle East (Third, Enlarged ed.). Philadelphia: University of Pennsylvania Press. ISBN 978-1-5128-0537-6.
- Rafeq, Abdul-Karim (1966). The Province of Damascus, 1723-1783. Beirut: Khayats.
- Schumacher, Gottlieb (1888). The Jaulân: Surveyed for the German Society for the Exploration of the Holy Land. London: Richard Bentley and Son.
