= Elmahjer =

- Sub-district
- Country: Syria
- Governorate: Quneitra
- District: Fiq
- Subdistrict: Elmahjer
- Time zone: UTC+2 (EET)
  - Summer (DST): UTC+3 (EEST)

Elmahjer is a Syrian sub-district that administratively belonged to Al Quneitra Governorate. Most of this sub-district is occupied by Israel since 1967 as the southern part of Golan Subdistrict.
