= Al-Rafid, Syria =

Al-Rafid الرفيد
- Town
- Location within the Golan Heights Location within Syria
- Coordinates: 32°57′18″N 35°54′5″E
- Grid position: 234/262 PAL
- Country: Syria
- Governorate: Quneitra
- District: Quneitra
- Subdistrict: Khishniyah
- Control: Israel

Population (2004 census)
  - Total: 2,263
- Time zone: UTC+3 (AST)

Al-Rafid (Arabic: الرفيد) is a village in southern Syria, administratively part of the Quneitra Governorate (Golan Heights), in the portion of the province under the United Nations Disengagement Observer Force Zone. According to the Syria Central Bureau of Statistics, al-Rafid had a population of 2,263 in the 2004 census. By June 2015, the population had increased to roughly 7,100 (of whom 3,100 were IDPs from the surrounding region). Its inhabitants are predominantly Sunni Muslims.

The town has been claimed by pro-Assadist forces during the Syrian Civil War.

== History ==
The village is recorded as Agrippina (Ἀγριππίνα) in the Diocletianic boundary stones corpus, dated to c. 300 CE. The site has been identified with al-Rafīd.

The name Agrippina reflects a royal estate or state-owned village established under the Julio-Claudian or Herodian dynasties during the first century CE, likely commemorating a prominent female member of the imperial or royal family, such as Agrippina the Elder, Agrippina the Younger, or a Herodian princess linked to Herod Agrippa I. It is also identified with the Mishnaic toponym Grofina (גרופינא or Grifina), recorded in Rabbinic literature as one of the station peaks where beacon fires were lit to signal the announcement of the New Moon from Jerusalem to Babylonia.

Archaeological excavations and surveys at al-Rafīd confirm that it was a major agrarian center during the Late Roman and Early Byzantine periods, covering an area of 6–7 hectares. The site contains well-preserved basalt domestic architecture built in the traditional Hauran style, alongside over 100 coins primarily dating from the third to sixth centuries CE, and extensive Galilee and Golan ceramic assemblages.

Transhumance shaped settlement in the Golan for centuries because of its harsh winters. The winters "forced tribespeople until the 19th century to live in hundreds of rudimentary 'winter villages' in their tribal territory. Starting in the second part of the 19th century, villages like al-Rafid became "fixed and formed the nucleus of fully sedentary life in the 20th century Golan." The inhabitants largely belong to the Na'im tribe, which has been established in the Golan region since the 15th–16th centuries.
