= Quneitra Subdistrict =

Quneitra
- Sub-district
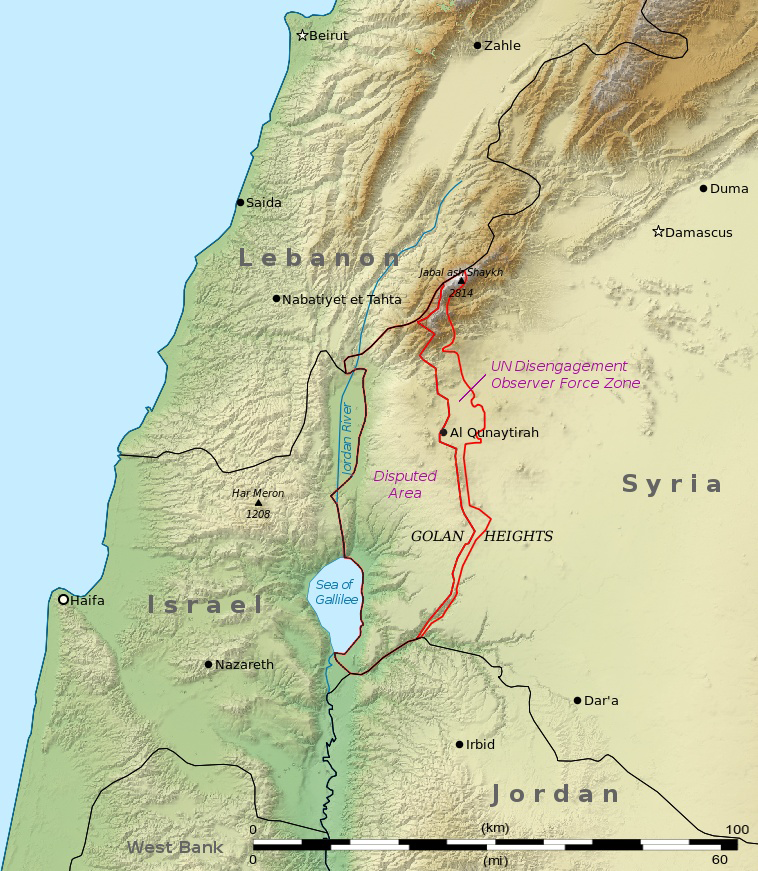
- Location of Quneitra in Syria Quneitra (Syria)
- Coordinates: 33.0719°N 35.7694°E
- Country: Syria
- Governorate: Quneitra
- District: Quneitra
- Time zone: UTC+2 (EET)
  - Summer (DST): UTC+3 (EEST)

Quneitra Subdistrict is a Syrian nahiyah (subdistrict) that administratively belongs to Al Quneitra Governorate.
