= Khushniyeh =

Former Syrian Circassian village in the Golan Heights

Khushniyeh الخشنية
- Village
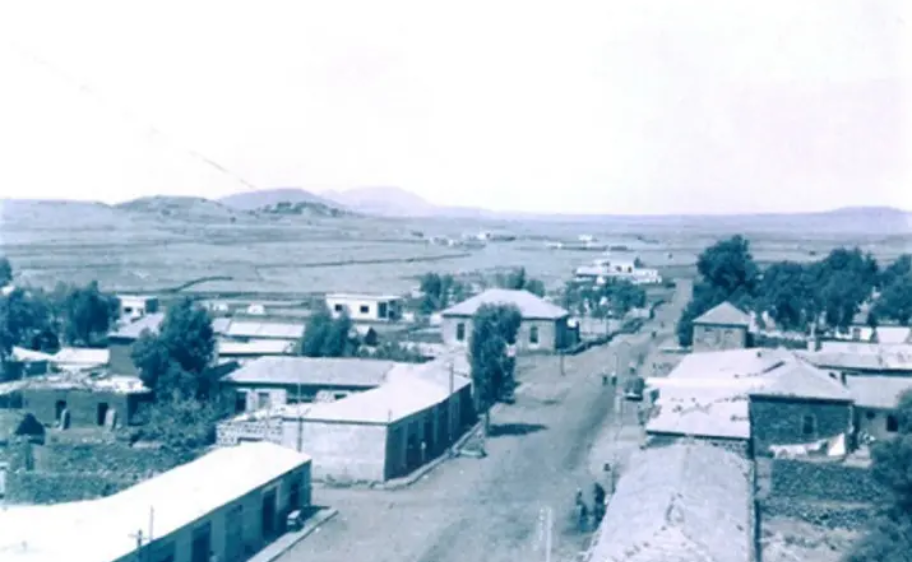
- View of Khushniyah before its destruction in 1967

- The Golan on the map of Syria; Khishniyah on the map of the Golan.
- Coordinates: 32°59′56″N 35°48′40″E
- PAL: 226/257
- Country: Syria
- Syrian Governorate: Quneitra Governorate
- Syrian District: Quneitra District
- Syrian Subdistrict: al-Khisniyah
- Destroyed: June 10, 1967

Population (1967)
  - Total: 1,029

Khushniyeh (Arabic: الخشنية), or Khishniyyeh (Хъышние къуажэ, "Khishniyyeh village") is a former Syrian town located in the Golan Heights.

== History ==
Archaeological excavations have revealed remains from the Roman, Byzantine and the Islamic periods following the Muslim conquest.

In the Ottoman tax registers of 1596, it was located in the nahiya of Jawlan Garbi, Qada of Hawran, under the name Mahuriyya (dir nazd Umm al Qanatir). It had a population of 5 Muslim households. They paid a fixed tax-rate of 25% on agricultural products, including wheat (750 a.), barley (180 a.), summer crops (1170 a.), goats and beehives (150 a.), in addition to occasional revenues (150 a.); a total of 2,800 akçe. 11/12 of the revenue went to a waqf.

The German-American, Palestine-based archaeologist Gottlieb Schumacher surveyed the village in the 1880s and described it as: "El-Khushniyeh — A large winter village on the Roman street west of er-Rafid, with scattered building stones. Most of the huts have fallen to pieces."

The old part of town was built with basalt stones. The residents worked with livestock and agriculture and Khushniyah was known for its vineyards and figs. Eucalyptus trees were planted in the town to fight off malaria. There were also several schools, a police station and a mosque built in 1956.

The population before the Six-Day War was 1029 or 1600. Previous to the 1967 war, Khishniyyah was inhabited by Circassians and related tribes, as one of ten villages and a town, Quneitra, settled in the Golan by these ethnic groups originating in the Northwest Caucasus. The village population comprised 43 Kabardian and Besleney families, 17 Abzakh, 6 Bzhedugh, 10 Abaza, and one Shapsugh family. The Golan Circassians constituted the largest concentration of Caucasians in Syria. Most Circassian refugees from the Golan resettled in the Syrian capital, Damascus, and in Aleppo, with some emigrating to Central and Western Europe (Germany, Holland, Austria, France) and North America (US and Canada).

After Israel occupied the area in the 1967 war, they set about destroying Syrian villages in the Golan Heights. Khushniyeh village was destroyed in 1967.

During the 1973 Yom Kippur War, the IDF presence at Khushniyeh was overrun by Syrian tanks and the Syrians held the position until being encircled and defeated by an Israeli force (see Yom Kippur War: Golan front).

The 1973 Syrian military camp was used as a temporary home by the founders of Moshav Keshet, an Israeli settlement established in 1974 south of Quneitra.

The site is known in Israel as Hushniya or Hurvat Hushniya, 'Hushniya Ruins'.

== Gallery: Khushniyeh after destruction ==
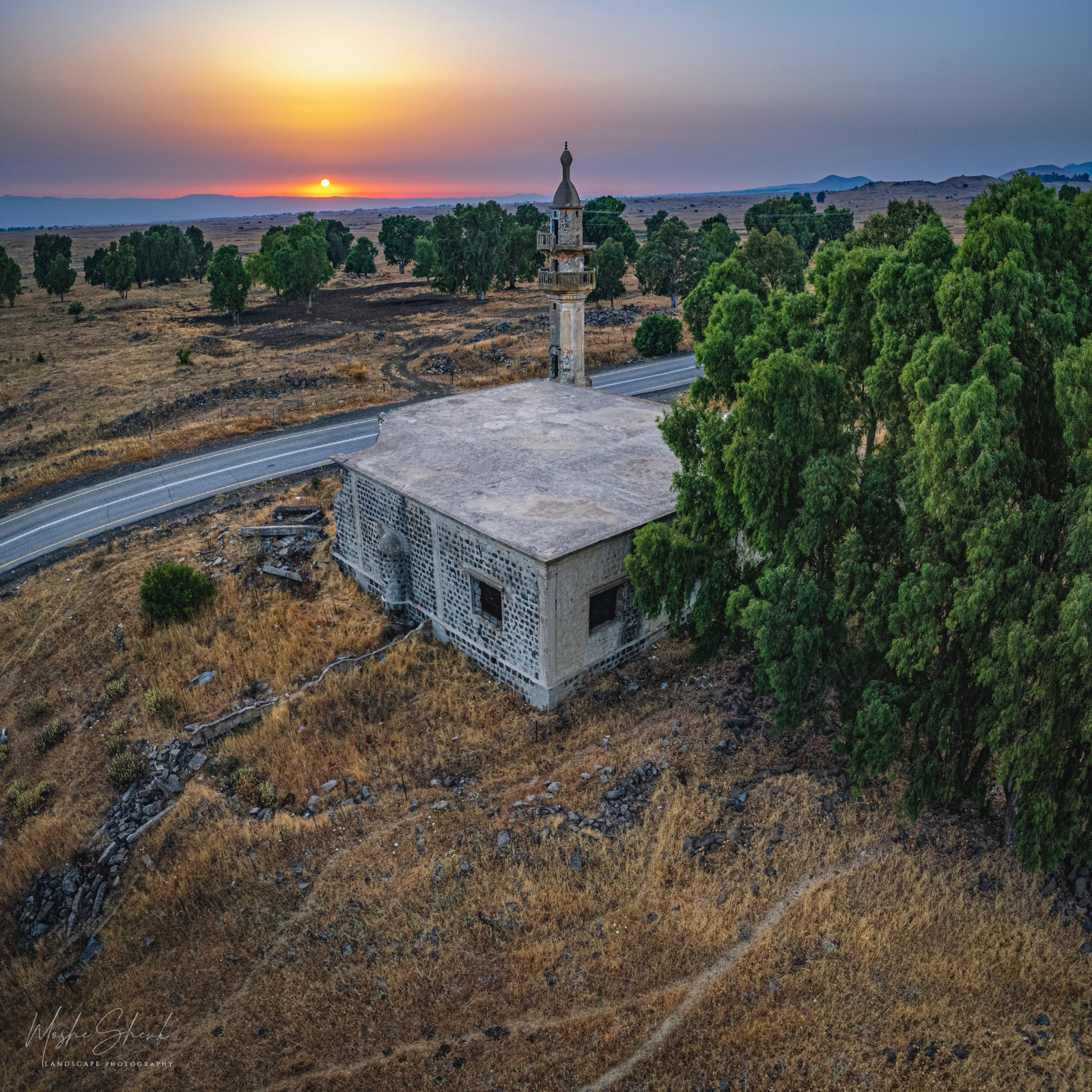

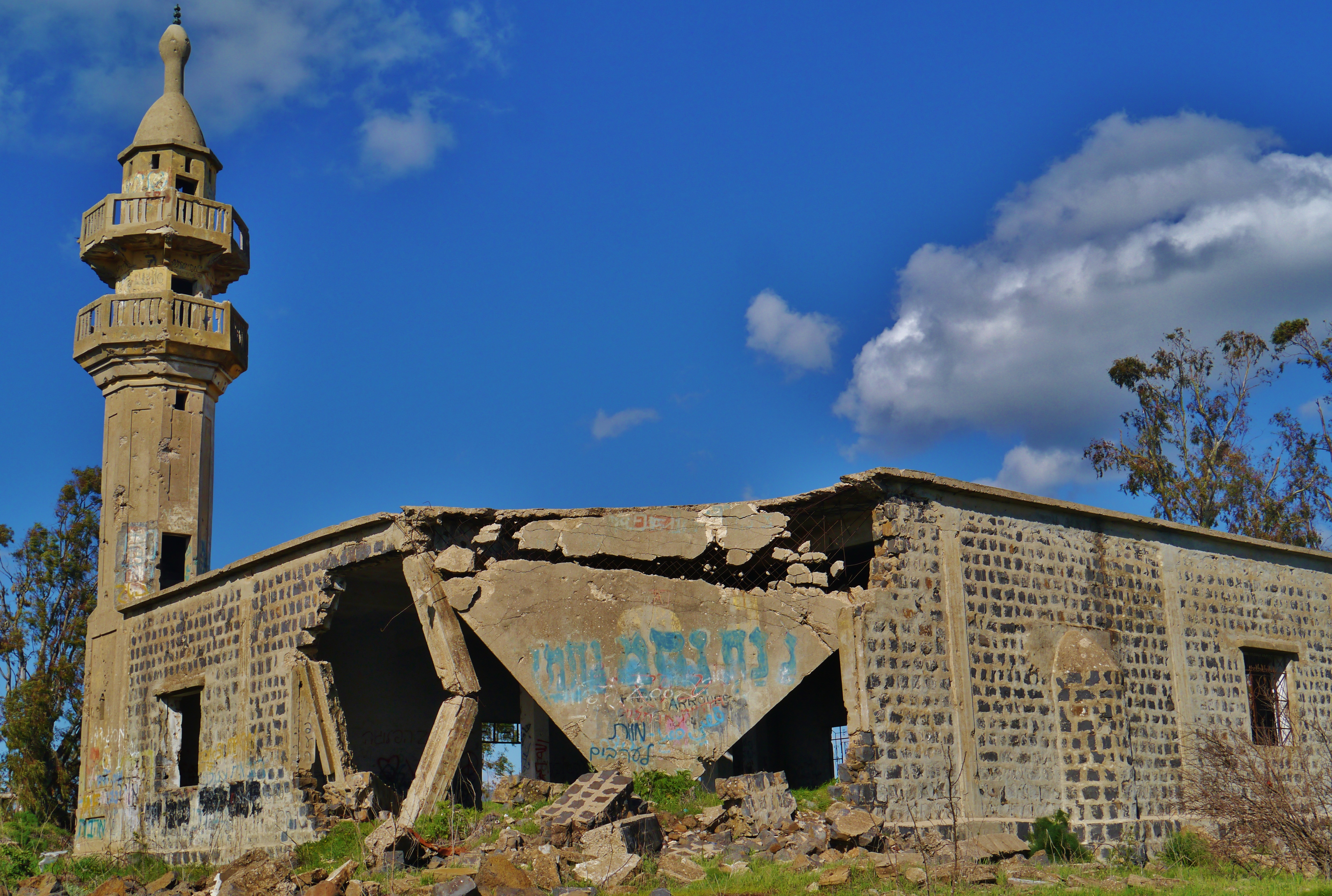

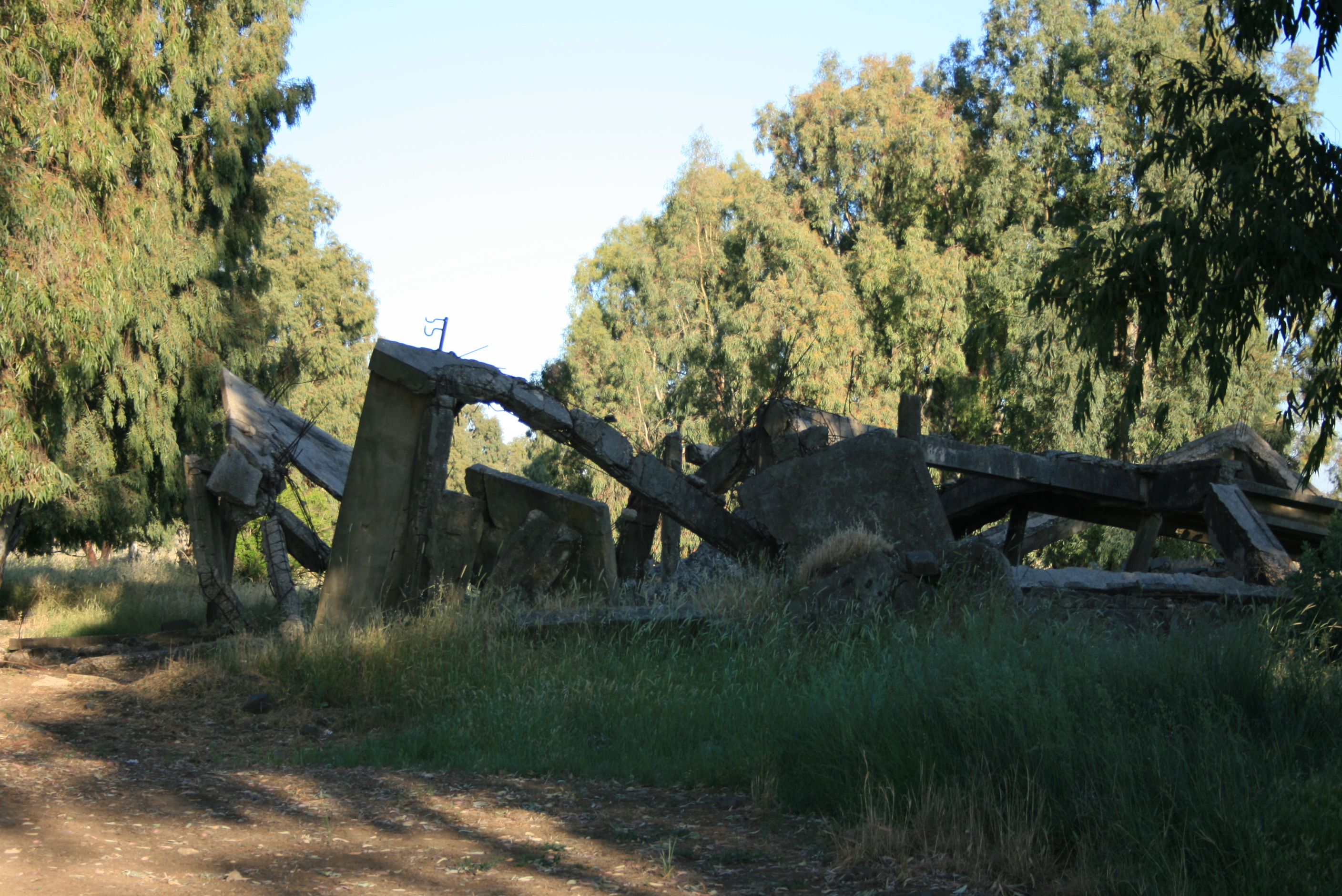

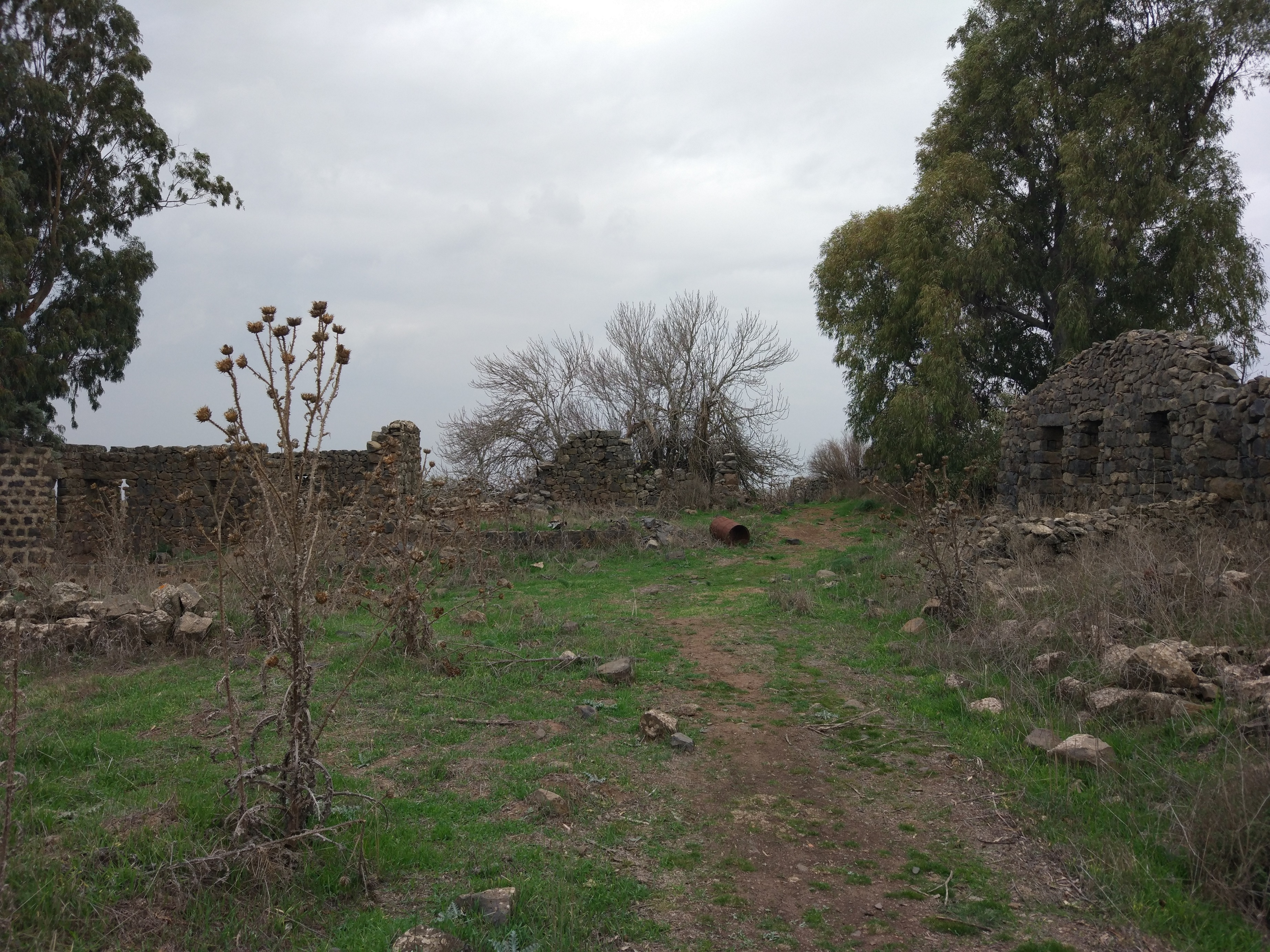

== See also ==
- Circassians in Syria

== Bibliography ==
- Hütteroth, W.-D.; Abdulfattah, K. (1977). Historical Geography of Palestine, Transjordan and Southern Syria in the Late 16th Century. Erlanger Geographische Arbeiten, Sonderband 5. Erlangen, Germany: Vorstand der Fränkischen Geographischen Gesellschaft. ISBN 3-920405-41-2.
- Sulimani, Gideon; Kletter, Raz (2022). "Settler-Colonialism and the Diary of an Israeli Settler in the Golan Heights: The Notebooks of Izhaki Gal". Journal of Holy Land and Palestine Studies. 21 (1). Edinburgh University Press: 48–71. doi:10.3366/hlps.2022.0283. ISSN 2054-1988.
