= Yigal Kipnis =

Israeli historian and author

- יגאל קיפניס
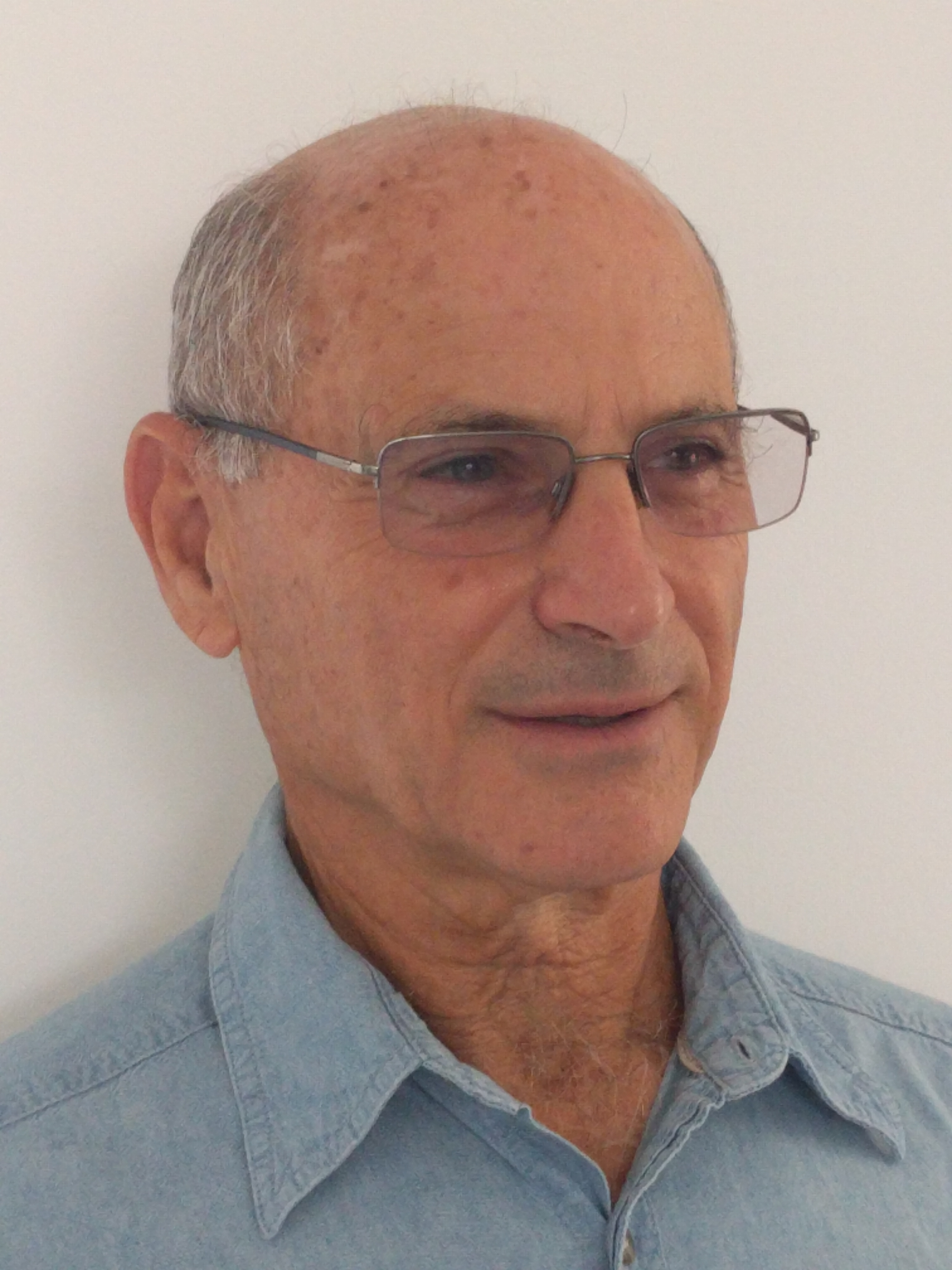
- Born: October 28, 1949 (age 76)

Yigal Kipnis (Hebrew: יגאל קיפניס; born October 28, 1949) is an Israeli historian and author.

== Biography ==
Yigal Kipnis earned a BSc in civil engineering from the Technion in Haifa (1977), and completed his MA (2003) and PhD (2006) in Land of Israel Studies at Haifa University. He served as a helicopter pilot in the Israeli Air Force for 31 years, of which 26 were in the reserves. Kipnis has lived on Moshav Ma'ale Gamla, an Israeli settlement on the occupied Golan Heights, since 1978.

== Published works ==
The Golan Heights: Political History, Settlement and Geography since 1949 (Routledge, 2013): The book presents Kipnis’ research on the settlement landscape in the Golan Heights on the eve of the Six-Day War and documents the rural Jewish settlement process in the Golan following the war, since 1967. Relations between Israel and Syria throughout this period are analyzed.

1973: The Road to War (Just World Books, 2013): The book deals with the circumstances leading to the 1973 war and the public discourse about it. In it, Kipnis reveals documentation of secret channels between US Secretary of State Henry Kissinger and the Israeli prime minister, Golda Meir, and between Kissinger and President Sadat of Egypt. Sadat's peace initiative, supported by President Nixon and Kissinger, was rejected by Israel's prime minister, resulting in the outbreak of the 1973 war. The documentation affirms the central role of political considerations and reduces the role of the intelligence failure when examining the factors leading to war.

1982, Lebanon and the Road to War (Routledge, 2025): On June 6, 1982, IDF forces entered Lebanon, ostensibly for a limited operation. In reality, after long and meticulous preparations, Israel launched a full-scale war—one that claimed many lives and shook public trust in decision-makers. Forty years later, the full details of the events and the individuals who led to the Lebanon War are revealed.

Using documents published for the first time in this book, historian Yigal Kipnis lays out the circumstances of the war, the preparations and discussions leading up to and during it, the intricate maneuvers with the U.S. administration and the Christian factions in Lebanon, and, above all, the consistent coordination between Prime Minister Menachem Begin and Defense Minister Ariel Sharon. Begin was not merely dragged along by Sharon’s far-reaching ambitions. The war’s objectives were shaped by his worldview, and he skillfully, shrewdly, and decisively navigated between his principles and his responsibilities as a leader guiding a nation into war and a political struggle over its legitimacy. However, as detailed reports from the U.S. State Department reveal, Begin was also subject to extreme emotional shifts.
