= Fiq District =

Fiq District منطقة فيق
- District
- Map of Fiq District within Quneitra Governorate. Fiq District is in yellow.
- Country: Syria
- Governorate: Quneitra
- Seat: Fiq (de jure)
- Subdistricts: 2 nawāḥī

Area
  - Total: 403.97 km^{2} (155.97 sq mi)

Population (2004)
  - Total: 1,947
  - Density: 4.820/km^{2} (12.48/sq mi)
- Geocode: SY1402

Fiq District (Arabic: منطقة فيق, romanized: manṭiqat Fiq) is a district of the Quneitra Governorate in southern Syria, which has partly been under Israeli occupation since 1967.

The de-jure administrative centre is the depopulated town of Fiq, which has been under Israeli occupation since 1967. According to the 2004 census, the district had a population of 1,947.

== Sub-districts ==
The district of Fiq is divided into two sub-districts or nawāḥī (population as of 2004):

Subdistricts of Fiq District
Code	Name	Area	Population
SY140200	Fiq Subdistrict	332.95 km^{2}	1,947
SY140201	Al-Butayhah Subdistrict	71.02 km^{2}	0
