= Keshet (Israeli settlement) =

Israeli settlement in the Golan Heights

Keshet: קֶשֶׁת (Hebrew)
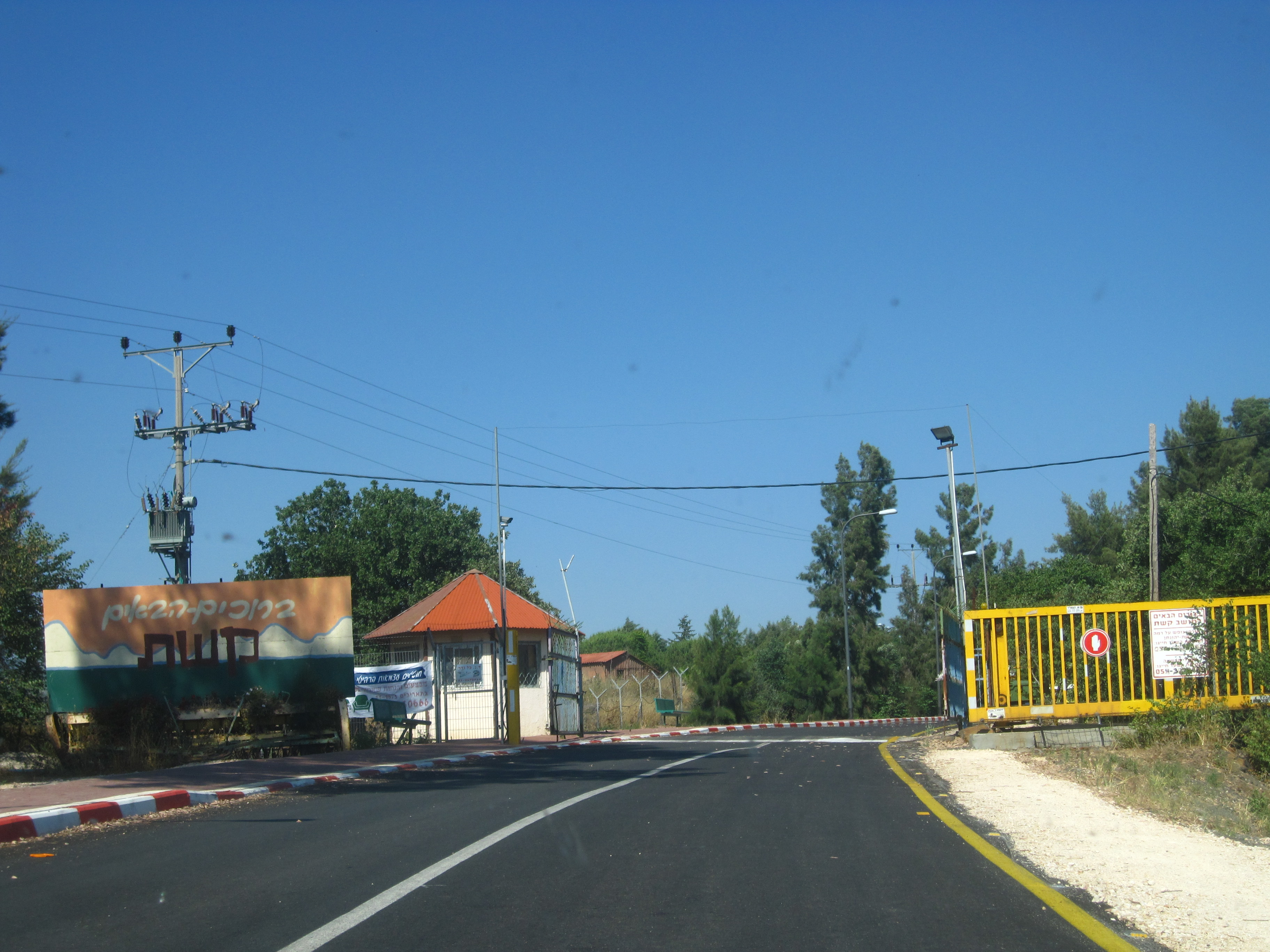

- Location within the Golan Heights Location within the Golan Heights
- Coordinates: 32°58′49″N 35°48′30″E
- Country: Golan Heights (Internationally recognized as Syrian territory occupied by Israel.)
- District: Northern
- Subdistrict: Golan
- Council: Golan
- Region: Golan Heights
- Affiliation: Hapoel HaMizrachi
- Founded: 1974
- Population (2024): 979

Keshet (Hebrew: קֶשֶׁת) is an Israeli settlement organized as a moshav shitufi in the Golan Heights. It was established in 1974 after the Yom Kippur War by young activists near the Syrian city of Quneitra, which had been occupied and subsequently razed to the ground in the Six-Day War. Its name is a translation of the name Quneitra ("arch"). In 2024 it had a population of 979.

The international community considers Israeli settlements in the Golan Heights illegal under international law, but the Israeli government disputes this.

== Geography ==
Keshet is situated near the volcanic cone of Mount Peres at 710 meters (2,330 ft) above sea level. It is located just south of Highway 87 between the Keshet Junction and the Bashan Junction.

== History ==
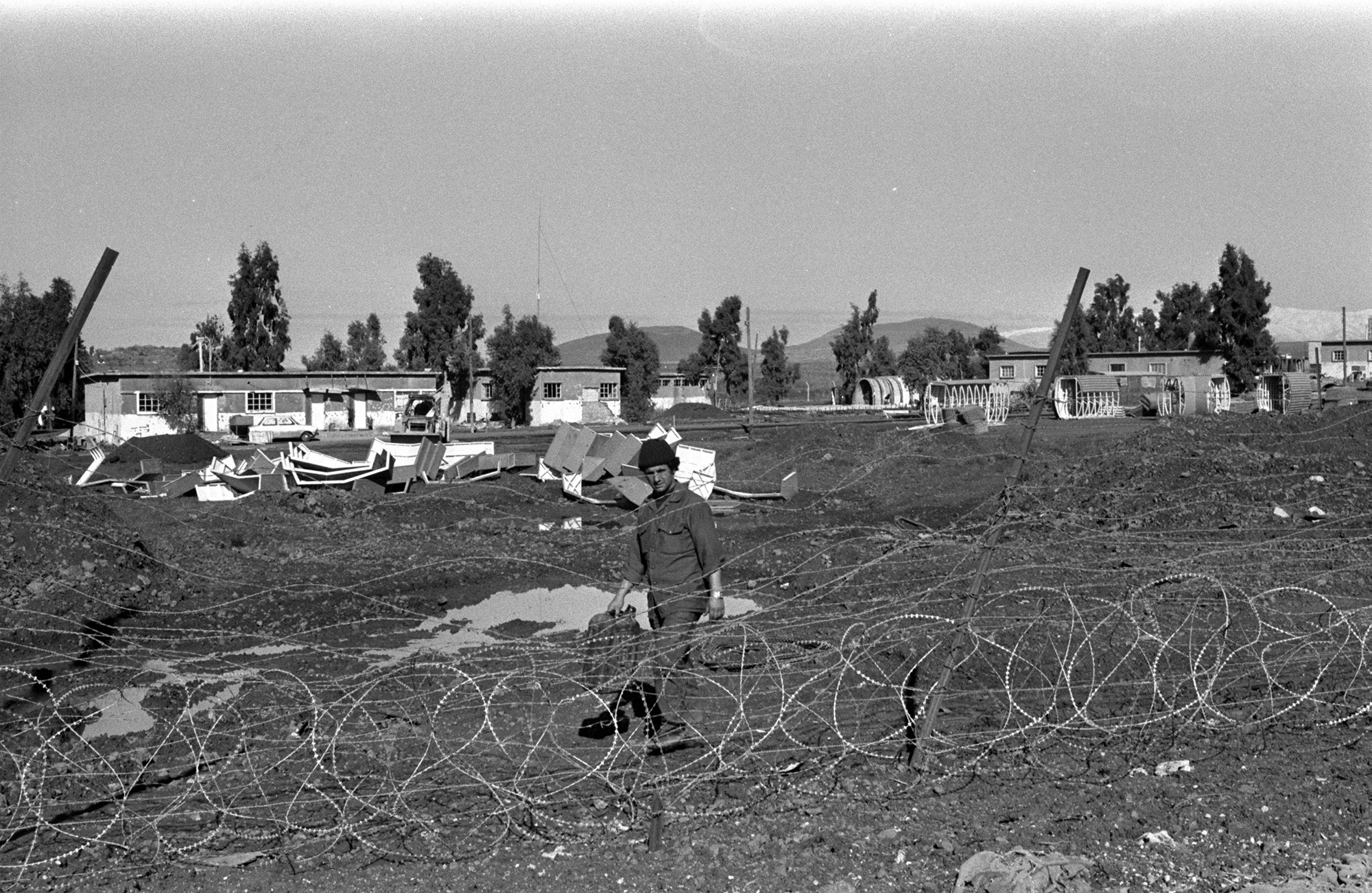
Construction of the Israeli settlement of Keshet in the occupied Golan Heights (1975)

Keshet was established in the period between the cease-fire and armistice agreement following the Yom Kippur War by national-religious and secular demonstrators who opposed an Israeli withdrawal to the pre-war line. They initially settled in a bunker in the fringes of Quneitra, but were forced to relocate to an abandoned Syrian farm when Quneitra was returned to Syria as part of the armistice agreement. Four months later, the Israeli government agreed to establish the settlement, and the settlers moved to another temporary location in an abandoned Syrian military camp further west. The settlement at its present location was established in 1978.

== Economy ==
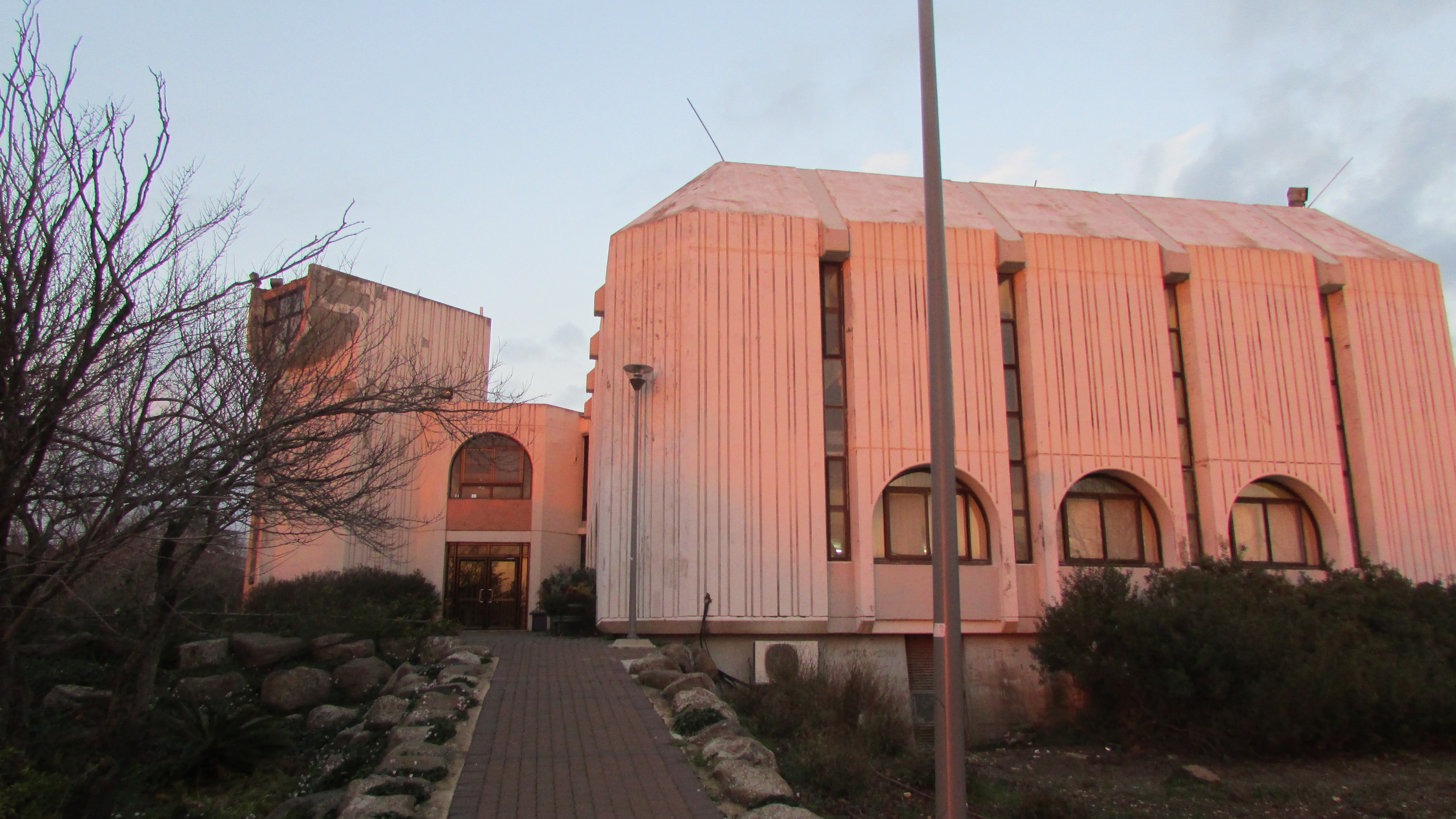
Keshet Synagogue

The community's economy is based on agriculture and tourism, and it has a field school and a religious mechina (military preparatory institution).

== See also ==
- Israeli-occupied territories
