= Quneitra District =

Quneitra District منطقة القنيطرة
- District
- Map of Quneitra District (yellow) within Quneitra Governorate
- Coordinates (Quneitra): 33.1256°N 35.8239°E
- Country: Syria
- Governorate: Quneitra
- Seat: Quneitra (de jure)
- Subdistricts: 4 nawāḥī

Area
  - Total: 1,312.57 km^{2} (506.79 sq mi)

Population (2004)
  - Total: 64,680
  - Density: 49.28/km^{2} (127.6/sq mi)
- Geocode: SY1400

Quneitra (or al-Qunaytirah) District (Arabic: منطقة القنيطرة, romanized: manṭiqat al-Qunayṭrah) is one of the two districts of the Quneitra Governorate in southern Syria. It is the northern of the two districts, with Fiq District to the south. Part of Quneitra District has been occupied by Israel since 1967, part has been in the Area of Separation of the U.N. Disengagement Observer Force Zone since 1974, and part is under Syrian control.

The administrative centre is the city of Quneitra. At the 2004 census, the district had a population of 64,680.

== Sub-districts ==
The district of Quneitra is divided into four sub-districts or nawāḥī (population as of 2004):

Subdistricts of Quneitra District
Code	Name	Area	Population
SY140000	Quneitra Subdistrict	332.75 km^{2}	4,318
SY140001	Jabta Elhashab Subdistrict	368.68 km^{2}	42,980
SY140002	Khishniyah Subdistrict	346.15 km^{2}	17,382
SY140003	Mas'ade Subdistrict	264.99 km^{2}	0
