= Quneitra Governorate =

Governorate of Syria

Quneitra Governorate مُحافظة القنيطرة (Arabic)
- Governorate
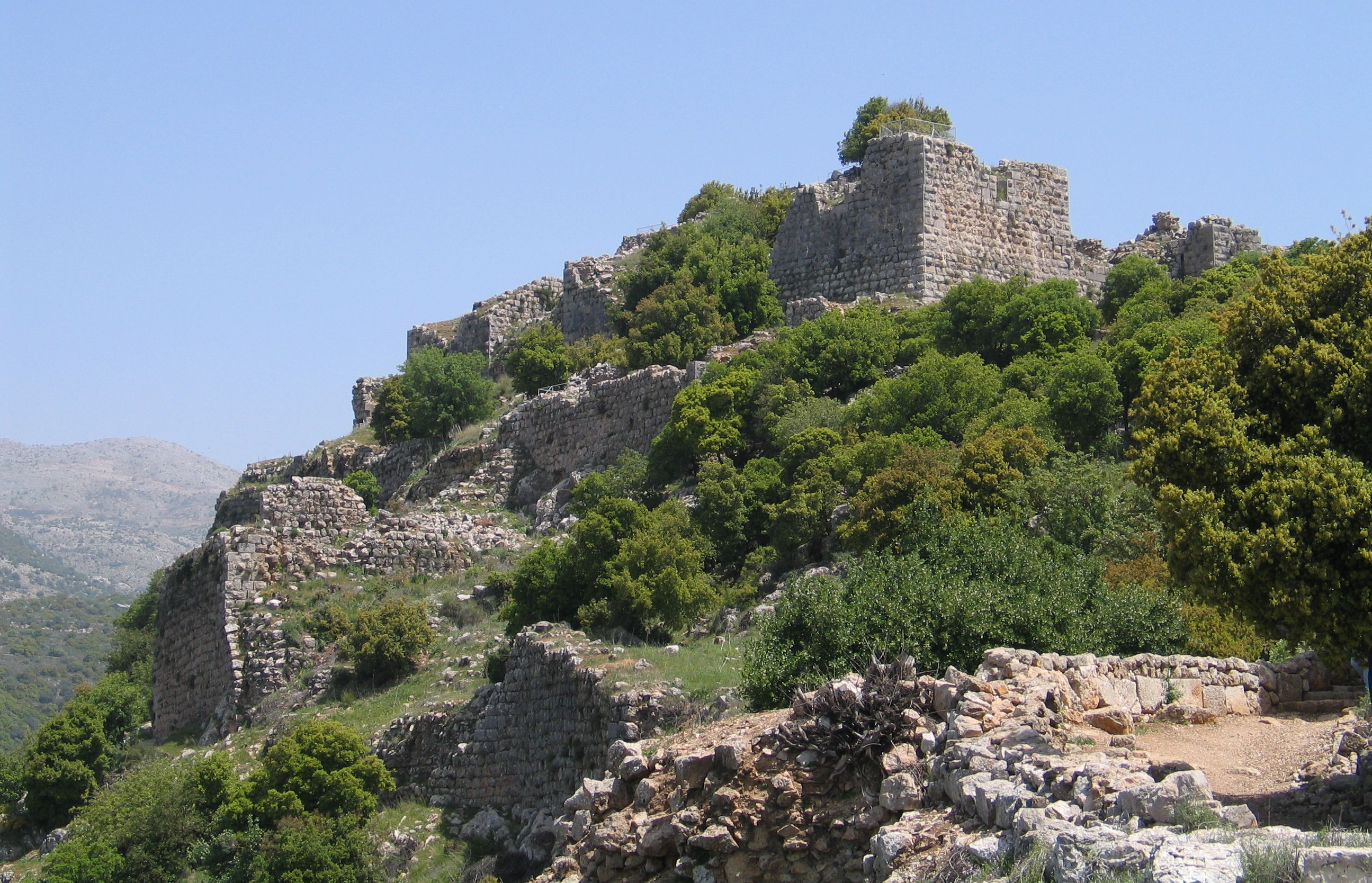
- Nimrod Fortress, built by the Ayyubids and hugely enlarged by the Mamluks

- Map of Syria with Quneitra Governorate highlighted in red, buffer zone highlighted in light red, and occupied portions are striped in light red and gray
- Coordinates (Quneitra): 33.126°N 35.824°E
- Country: Syria
- Control: Israel; Syria
- Capital: Quneitra (de jure); Madinat al-Salam (de facto)

Government
  - Governor: Ghassan Elias al-Sayyed Ahmad

Area
  - Total: 1,200 km^{2} (460 sq mi)
- Estimates range between 685 km^{2} and 1,861 km^{2}

Population (2021)
  - Total: 105,124
  - Density: 88/km^{2} (230/sq mi)

Time zones
- Israeli-occupied Golan Heights: UTC+2 (IST)
  - Summer (DST): UTC+3 (IDT)
- Rest of the Quneitra Governorate: UTC+3 (AST)
- ISO 3166 code: SY-QU
- Main language(s): Arabic

Quneitra Governorate (Note: Arabic: مُحافظة القنيطرة, romanized: Muḥāfaẓat al-Qunayṭira) is one of the fourteen governorates (provinces) of Syria. It is situated in southern Syria, and is notable for officially including the Israel-occupied Golan Heights, which make up the majority of its area. The governorate borders the countries of Lebanon, Jordan and Israel, and the Syrian governorates of Daraa and Rif Dimashq. Its area varies, according to different sources, from 685 km^{2} to 1,861 km^{2}. The governorate had a population of 87,000 at the 2010 estimate. The nominal capital is the now abandoned city of Quneitra, destroyed by Israel before their withdrawal in June 1974 in the aftermath of the Yom Kippur War; since 1986, the de facto capital is Madinat al-Salam.

During the Syrian civil war, most of the portions of the governorate that are not held by Israel were taken by various opposition and jihadist forces. In the summer of 2018, the rebel-held areas in the governorate were retaken by the Syrian government.

Following the 2024 Syrian opposition offensives, the resurgent Southern Front declared full control over the governorate (excluding Israeli-controlled areas). Later, Israel advanced its troops into the buffer zone amid reports of artillery strikes on local villages.

== History ==
The area surrounding Quneitra has been inhabited for millennia. Paleolithic hunter-gatherers are thought to have lived there, as evidenced by the discovery of Levallois and Mousterian flint tools in the vicinity. A settlement was established at least as early as the late Hellenistic period, and continued through the Roman and Byzantine times; it was known by the name "Sarisai". The settlement served as a stop on the road from Damascus to western Palestine. Saint Paul is said to have passed through the settlement on his way from Jerusalem to Damascus. The site of the Conversion of Paul was traditionally identified with the small village of Kokab, north-east of Quneitra, on the road to Damascus.

Transhumance shaped settlement in the Golan for centuries because of the region's harsh winters. The winters "forced tribespeople until the 19th century to live in hundreds of rudimentary 'winter villages' in their tribal territory. Starting in the second part of the 19th century, the villages became "fixed and formed the nucleus of fully sedentary life in the 20th century Golan."

The governorate was established in 1964 by the merger of Quneitra District, which belonged to Rif Dimashq Governorate and Fiq District which belonged to Daraa Governorate. The reason for the establishment of this new governorate was the necessity to govern the Golan Heights as a single administrative unit due to its strategic and military importance along the borders with the newly established State of Israel.

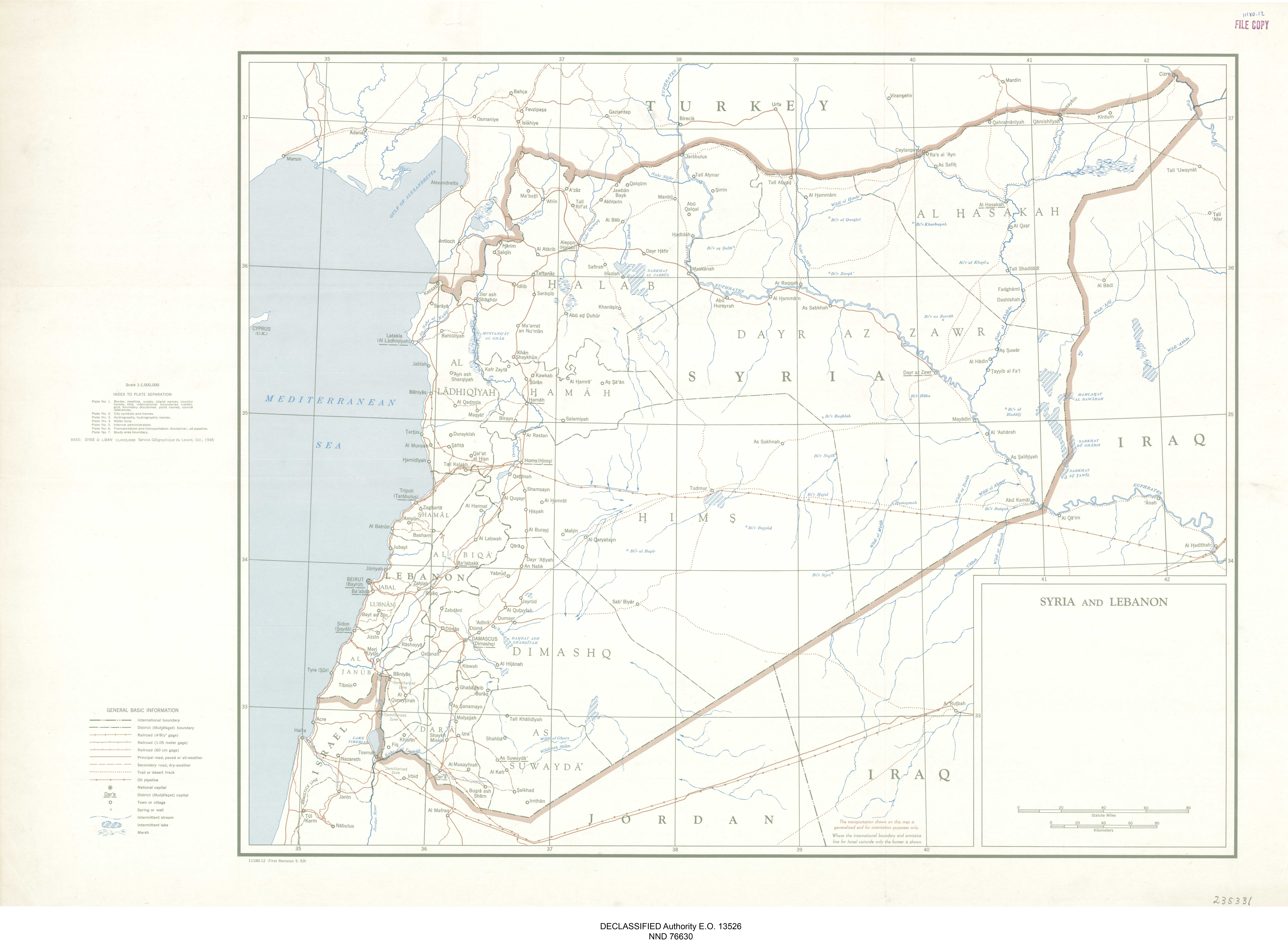
Map of Syria from 1953, showing the territory of the Quneitra Governorate split between the Daraa and Dimashq governorates

=== Six-Day War ===
Most of the governorate was occupied by Israel in the 1967 Six-Day War. The deserted city remained in Israeli hands for the next six years. However, Israel and Syria remained in a state of war throughout this period (and, indeed, to the present day). The town gained a fresh symbolic value; it was seen by the Syrians as "the badge of Syria's defeat, an emblem of hatred between Syria and Israel and a cross [Syrian President Hafez al-Assad] had to bear."

=== Yom Kippur War ===
During the first few days of the Yom Kippur War in 1973, Quneitra was briefly recaptured by the Syrian Army before it was repulsed in an Israeli counter-offensive. In mid-October 1973, the Israeli counter-offensive started. Syrians forces had massed nearly 1,000 tanks along a 100 km (60 mi) front. Israeli forces responded with a large scale armoured attack against the Syrians. Although the Syrians initially retreated, they later counterattacked and pushed back into occupied territory. Quneitra changed hands several times during the fighting. Israeli armored units, supported by Phantoms and Skyhawk fighter jets conducting close air support and napalm strikes against forward Syrian positions eventually halted the Syrian advance and forced the Syrian Army to retreat.

==== Destruction of the city ====
A group of settlers from Merom Golan – a settlement established in 1967 – took over an abandoned bunker in Quneitra and declared it to be a new settlement called Keshet (Quneitra in Hebrew). The settlers also set about razing the existing town to the ground. The leader of Merom Golan, Yehuda Harel, and another Merom Golan member, Shimshon Wollner, initiated the destruction of Quneitra, which was carried out by the Land Development Administration of the Jewish National Fund. Harel later described what happened:

Shimshon and I walked around Quneitra all day and tried decide what to do. And then these two strange ideas came up. One was to establish a settlement in Quneitra and the second was to destroy Quneitra.

Wollner and Harel asked the Jewish National Fund to carry out the work, ostensibly to prepare an area for agricultural cultivation, but were refused as they did not have permission from the Israeli army. They then approached the Assistant to the Head of Northern Command and asked him to mark on a map which buildings the army needed. According to Harel,

So he took a felt pen and marked the hospital and a few other places – he wrote "not for destruction" and on other places he wrote "for destruction" and he signed. He thought he was signing about what not to destroy but he was actually writing to destroy . . . The tractors of the Jewish National Fund did the destroying. They weren't our tractors . . . I can tell you that even the tractor drivers were Arabs.

The buildings were systematically stripped, with anything movable being removed and sold to Israeli contractors, before they were pulled apart with tractors and bulldozers.

The disengagement went into force on 6 June. On 26 June, the Syrian president Hafez al-Assad travelled to Quneitra where he pledged to return the rest of the occupied territories to Syrian control. Western reporters accompanied Syrian refugees returning to the city in early July 1974 and described what they saw on the ground. Time magazine's correspondent reported that "Most of its buildings are knocked flat, as though by dynamite, or pockmarked by shellfire." Le Monde's Syria correspondent, in a report for The Times, gave a detailed eyewitness description of the destruction:

Today the city is unrecognisable. The houses with their roofs lying on the ground look like gravestones. Parts of the rubble are covered with fresh earth furrowed by bulldozer tracks. Everywhere there are fragments of furniture, discarded kitchen utensils, Hebrew newspapers dating from the first week of June; here a ripped-up mattress, there the springs of an old sofa. On the few sections of wall still standing, Hebrew inscriptions proclaim: "There'll be another round"; "You want Quneitra, you'll have it destroyed."

Israel asserted that most of the damage had been caused in the two wars and during the artillery duels in between. Several reports from before the withdrawal did refer to the city as "ruined" and "shell-scarred". The Times' correspondent saw the city for himself on 6 May, a month before the Israeli withdrawal, and described it as being "in ruins and deserted after seven years of war and dereliction. It looks like a wild west city struck by an earthquake and if the Syrians get it back they will face a major feat of reconstruction. Nearly every building is heavily damaged and scores have collapsed."

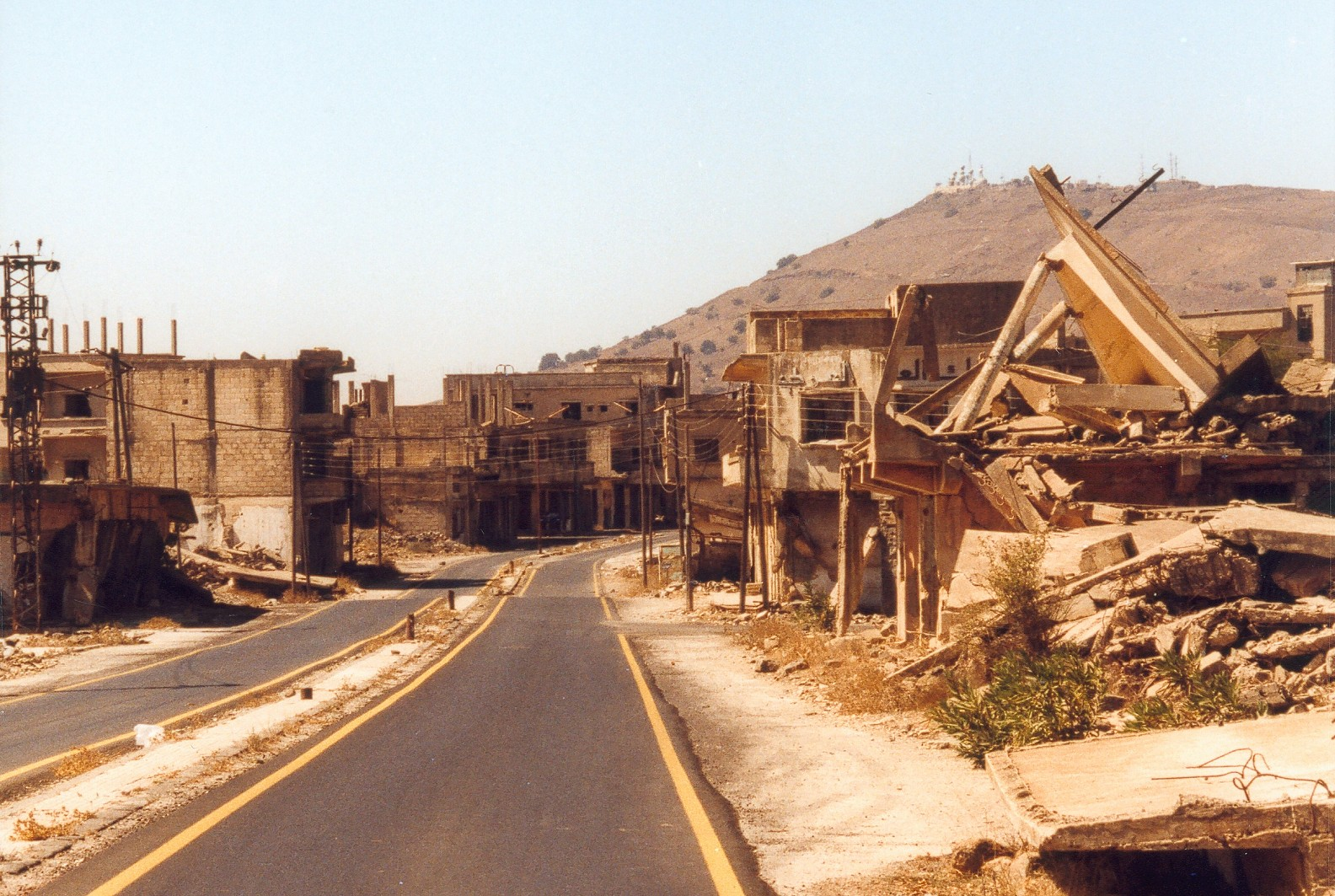
View of the destroyed city

Direct evidence of the city's condition was provided when it was filmed on 12 May 1974 by a British television news team which included the veteran journalist Peter Snow, who was reporting for Independent Television News on the disengagement negotiations. His report was broadcast on ITN's News at Ten programme. According to The Times' correspondent Edward Mortimer, "viewers were thus afforded a panoramic view of the city, which had stood almost completely empty since the Syrian army evacuated it in 1967. It could be seen that many of the buildings were damaged, but most of them were still standing." After it was handed over, "very few buildings were left standing. Most of those destroyed did not present the jagged outline and random heaps of rubble usually produced by artillery or aerial bombardment. The roofs lay flat on the ground, 'pancaked' in a manner which I am told can only be achieved by systematic dynamiting of the support walls inside." Mortimer concluded that the footage "establishes beyond reasonable doubt that much of the destruction took place after 12 May—at a time when there was no fighting anywhere near Kuneitra."

The United Nations established a Special Committee to Investigate Israeli Practices Affecting the Human Rights of the Population of the Occupied Territories, which engaged a Swiss engineer Edward Gruner to investigate the damage. Gruner and a team of surveyors spent four months in Quneitra, documenting every building and its condition. His report concluded that Israeli forces had deliberately destroyed the city prior to their withdrawal, including almost 4,000 buildings and a large amount of infrastructure, of value estimated at 463 million Syrian pounds. The report's conclusions were subsequently adopted by the United Nations General Assembly. It passed a resolution on 29 November 1974 describing the destruction of Quneitra as "a grave breach of the [Fourth] Geneva Convention" and "condemn[ing] Israel for such acts," by a margin of 93 votes to 8, with 74 abstentions. The United Nations Commission on Human Rights also voted to condemn the "deliberate destruction and devastation" of Quneitra in a resolution of 22 February 1975, by a margin of 22 votes to one (the United States) with nine abstentions.

=== 1990s ===
During negotiations with Israel on a peace agreements in the 1990s, Syria claimed the Israel–Syria demilitarised zone established under the 1949 Armistice Agreements as its territory, falling within the Quneitra Governorate. The Israeli government rejected the claims, as it would have led to Syria having territory west of the 1923 border between Mandatory Palestine and the French Mandate of Syria, which included Israeli kibbutzim established in the area before the Six-Day War.

=== Syrian civil war ===
During the Syrian civil war, by the autumn of 2014, most of the portions of the governorate that are not held by Israel, were captured by various opposition and jihadist forces, with only a small enclave remaining under pro-Ba'athist militias in the north. In June 2015, the rebels launched an offensive to capture the governorate, but were repelled by the Syrian Army. In October 2015, the rebels launched another offensive, which once again ended in a stalemate. Despite a semi-ceasefire set up by Russia and the US in September 2016, insurgents in the governorate declared a new offensive against the government forces there.

In June and July 2018, the rebel-held areas in the governorate was almost entirely retaken by the Syrian Army and its allies with Russian air support, with only a marginal part remaining at the hands of the ISIL-allied Khalid ibn al-Walid Army near the Jordanian border. The rebel groups of Ahrar al-Sham, Hay'at Tahrir al-Sham, Southern Front, Jaysh al-Islam, Alwiya al-Furqan and Army of Free Tribes evacuated from the area to Idlib under an agreement with the Syrian government. In August 2018, Russia deployed its military police force to man several posts along the Bravo line of the buffer zone on the Golan Heights.

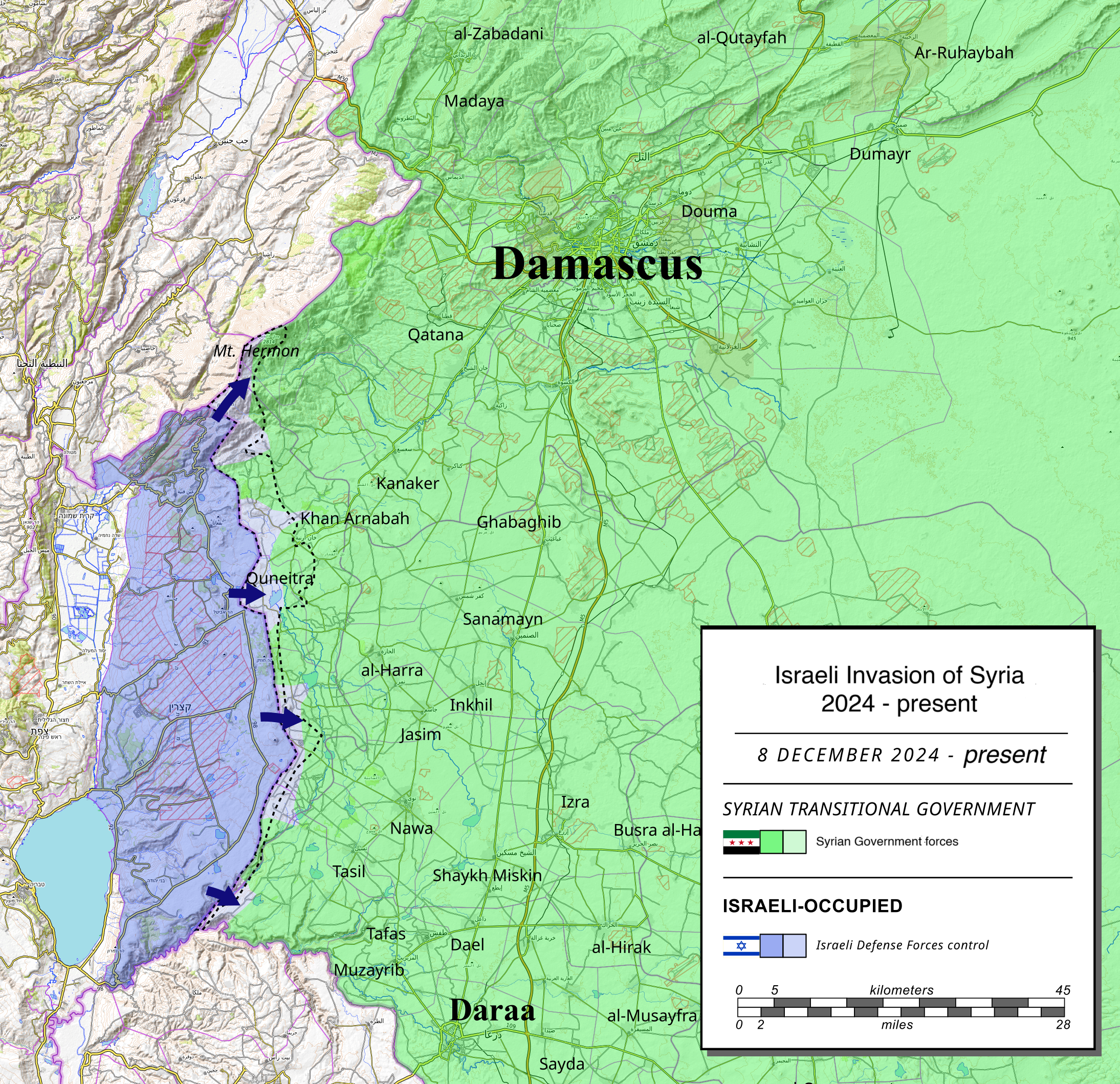
Israeli-occupied Golan Heights and Israeli invasion of Syria in December 2024

In early December 2024, the Southern Front which sprang up again following the offensives in the north, announced full control over Quneitra Governorate (the areas not under Israeli occupation).

After the fall of the Assad regime on 8 December 2024, Israel launched an invasion into the governorate, advancing into the UNDOF buffer zone with claims of Israeli artillery strikes on local villages. On 23 February 2025, Israeli Prime Minister Benjamin Netanyahu demanded the complete demilitarization of southern Syria in the provinces of Quneitra, Daraa and Suweyda, and the withdrawal of Syrian forces from Syrian territory south of Damascus. Israeli Defense Minister Israel Katz said that Israeli forces would remain in southern Syria "for an indefinite period of time to protect our communities and thwart any threat."

== Districts ==

The governorate is divided into two districts (manatiq). The districts are further divided into six sub-districts (nawahi):

- Quneitra District (al Qunaytirah), which is further officially divided into 4 sub-districts (nawahi):
  - Quneitra Subdistrict (mostly in UNDOF Zone since 1973)
  - Jubata al-Khashab Subdistrict
  - Mas'ade Subdistrict (under Israeli occupation since 1967)
  - Khushniyeh Subdistrict (under Israeli occupation since 1967)
- Fiq District, which is further officially divided into 2 sub-districts (nawahi):
  - Fiq Subdistrict
  - Elmahjer Subdistrict

== Demographics ==
Before the Six-Day War and Yom Kippur War, the Golan Heights comprised 312 inhabited areas, including 2 towns, 163 villages, and 108 farms. In 1966, the Syrian population of the Golan Heights was estimated at 147,613. Israel seized about 70% of the Golan Heights in the closing stages of the Six-Day War. Many of these residents fled during the fighting, or were driven out by the Israeli army, and some were evacuated by the Syrian army. A cease-fire line was established and large parts of the region came under Israeli military control, including the town of Quneitra, about 139 villages and 61 farms. Of these, the Census of Population 1967 conducted by the Israel Defence Forces listed only eight, including Quneitra. One of the remaining populated villages, Shayta, was partially destroyed in 1967 and a military post built in its place. Between 1971–72 it was destroyed completely, with the remaining population forcibly transferred to Mas'ade, another of the populated villages under Israeli control.

Prior to the 1967 Six-Day War, the population of Quneitra governorate was between 130,000 and 145,000, of which about 17,000 were Palestinian refugees. The rural and urban population of Quneitra governorate consisted of Druze Arabs living in the north of the governorate, Circassians (descendants of refugees who fled their homeland in the North Caucasus during the Tsarist-Circassian genocide in the 19th century), Turkmens, Arab Alawites, Arab Sunni Fellahin and Bedouin. The urban population of the city of Quneitra included Isma'ili and Shi'a Muslim Arabs. Others had previously moved to the North Caucasus after the fall of the Soviet Union. The Golan Heights was the principal concentration of Syrian Circassians in the entire country.

The population of Syrian-ruled portions of Quneitra Governorate in 2021 was estimated to be 105,124. Prior to the Syrian civil war, about 8.5% of Palestinian refugees living in Syria, lived in Quneitra Governorate. The total number of refugees and descendants from Israeli-occupied Golan Heights was estimated to be more than 350,000, mostly living in and around Damascus.

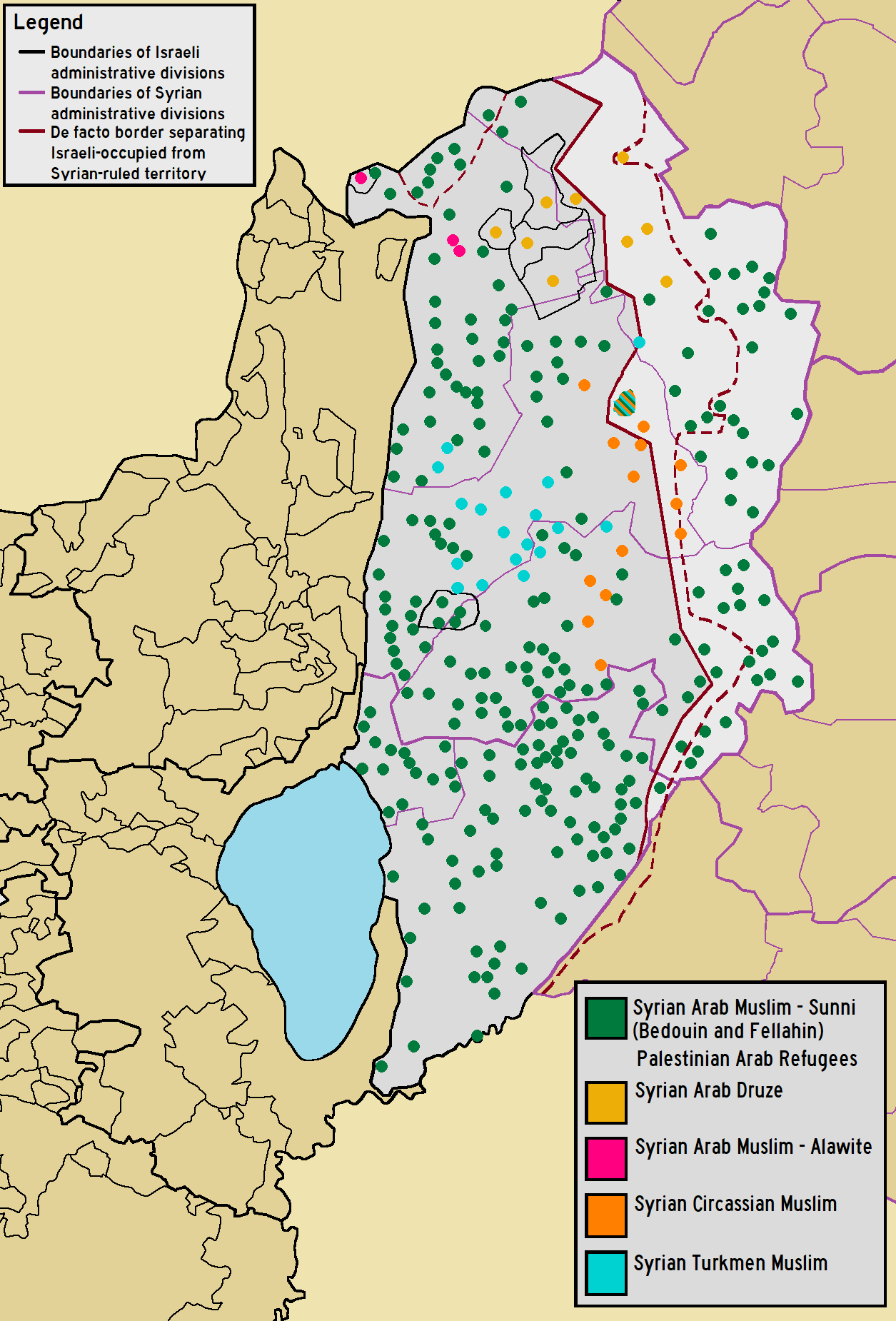
Demographic map of Quneitra Governorate (Golan Heights) before the 1967 six day war

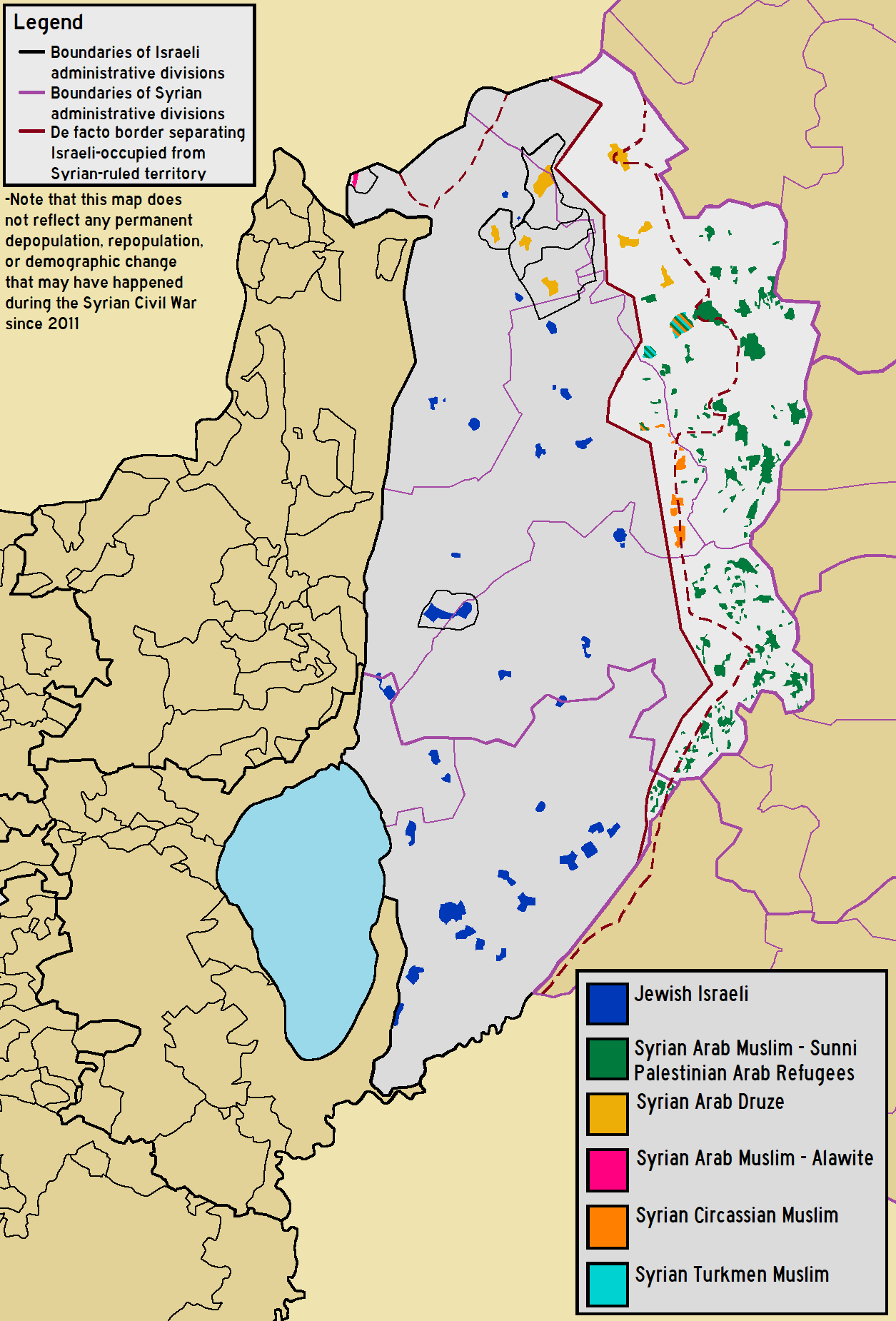
Demographic map of Quneitra Governorate (Golan Heights) today (excludes any permanent depopulation or repopulation that might have happened during the Syrian civil war

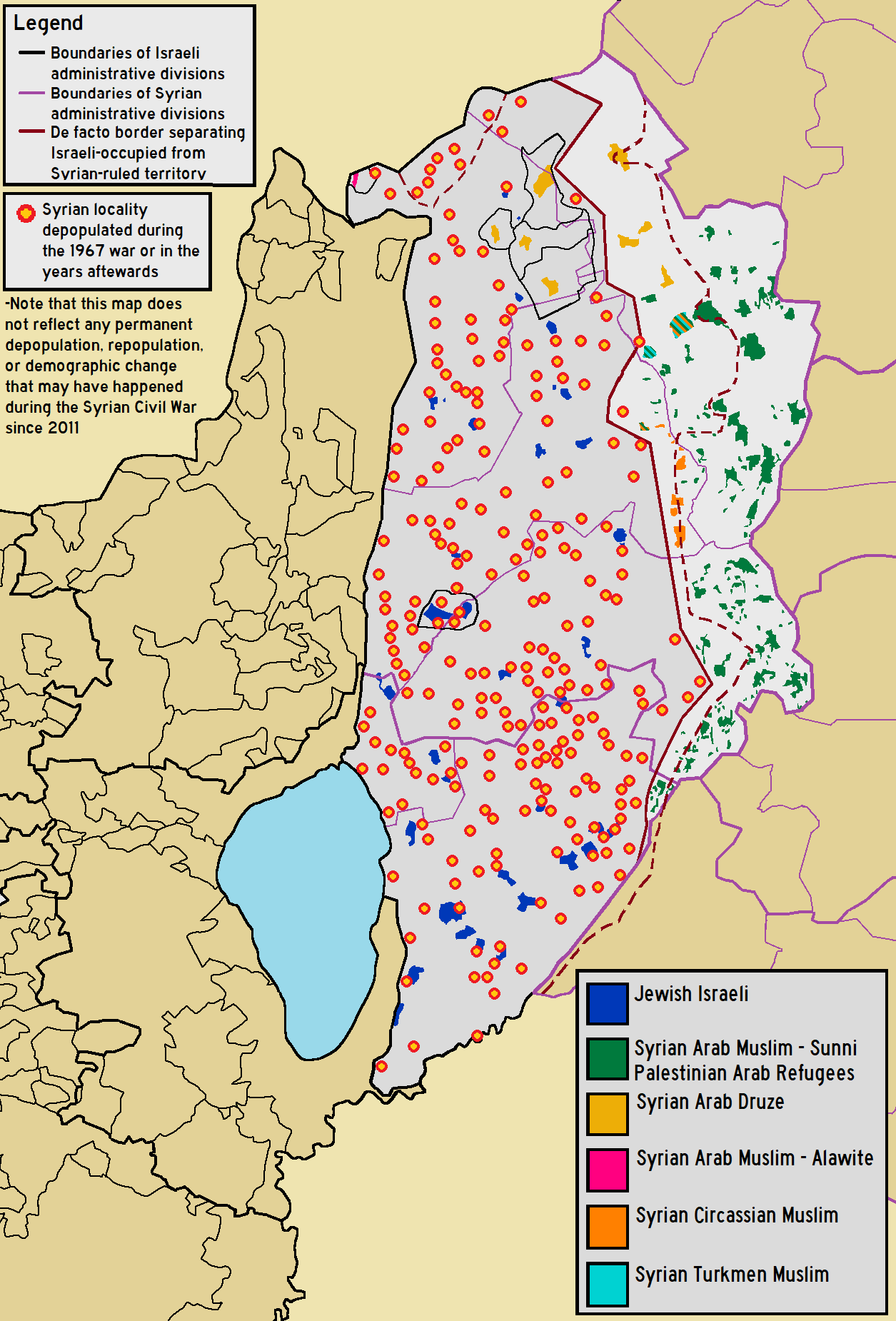
Demographic map of Quneitra Governorate (Golan Heights) overlaid with the location of the depopulated Syrian localities.

== See also ==
- Governorates of Syria
- United Nations Disengagement Observer Force
- UNDOF Zone
- Druze in Syria
