= Armed factions in the aftermath of the Syrian civil war =

This is a list of armed factions in the aftermath of the Syrian civil war

== Armed factions in Syria (2024–present) ==
| (Syria) Syrian Arab Republic (caretaker and transitional governments) and allies | (Ba'athist Syria) Pro-Ba'athist groups | Democratic Autonomous Administration of North and East Syria and allies | Jihadist groups | Israel and allied Druze forces |
|---|---|---|---|---|
| (Syria) Syrian government forces; Syrian Armed Forces; Syrian Army; 40th Division; 56th Division; 12th Brigade; 107th Brigade; 80th Division; 62nd Division; 76th Division; 118th Division; 84th Division; 66th Division; 80th Division; 86th Division; 72nd Division; Syrian Air Force; Syrian Navy; Ministry of Interior; Internal Security Forces; General Intelligence Service; Criminal Investigations Department; Special Missions Department; Desert Security Forces; (Syria) Syrian National Army (until 2025); Hamza Division (until 2025); Sultan Suleiman Shah Division (until 2025); Syrian Turkmen Brigades (until 2025); Sultan Mehmed the Conqueror Brigade (until 2025); Sultan Murad Division (until 2025); (Syria) Burkan al-Furat; (Syria) Ahrar al-Sharqiya remnants; Turkey; Turkish Armed Forces; Turkish Land Forces; Turkish Air Force; (Syria) Free Hasakah Forces; (Syria) Ahrar al-Jazeera; Ahrar Jabal al-Arab; Guest House of Dignity; Pro-government Deir ez-Zor Military Council defectors; Tribal militias (partially aligned with government): Arab Tribal and Clan Forces; Lions of the Ougaidat Brigade; Syrian Council of Tribes and Clans; Southern Tribes Gathering; Anizah; Bani Khalid; Al-Uqaydat; Al-Shaitat; Al-Busraya; Mawali; Al-Bu Nasir; Nu'aym; Tribes of Lajat; Al-Baggara; Bani Sakher; Tayy; Shammar; Al-Sanadid Forces; Jubur; al-Buhamad clan | (Ba'athist Syria) Assad loyalists; (Ba'athist Syria) Coastal Shield Brigade; (Ba'athist Syria) Military Council for the Liberation of Syria; (Ba'athist Syria) Saraya al-Jawad; (Ba'athist Syria) Fawj Azra’il al-Jabal; Syrian Social Nationalist Party; Eagles of the Whirlwind; (Ba'athist Syria) Haymed's Group; (Ba'athist Syria) Ahmad al-Labbad's group; NDF remnants; (Ba'athist Syria) Shabiha remnants; (Ba'athist Syria) Suhayl al-Hasan loyalists; (Ba'athist Syria) Mohammad Kanjo Hassan loyalists; Islamic Resistance Front in Syria; Syrian Popular Resistance; (Ba'athist Syria) Coastal Shield Brigade defectors; Popular Resistance of the Eastern Region; Popular Resistance in Daraa; Popular Resistance in Quneitra; Saraya al-Areen; Baqiyat Allah Brigades; Syrian Resistance; Supported by: Hezbollah; East Lebanese tribes; Abbas Shield Martyrdom Forces; (Palestine) Palestinian militias (against Israel only): (Palestine) Martyr Muhammad al-Deif Brigades; Hamas; (Hamas) Al-Qassam Brigades; (Hamas) Aknaf Bait al-Maqdis remnants; Palestinian Islamic Jihad; (Palestinian Islamic Jihad) Al-Quds Brigade; Jamaa Islamiya; Al-Fajr Forces | Syrian Democratic Forces (until 2026); People's Protection Units; Women's Protection Units; Şehid Ayaz Battalion; Martyr Haroun Units; Asayish; Raqqa Internal Security Forces; Self-Defense Forces; Hêzên Komandos; Afrin Liberation Forces (alleged); Various military councils; Al-Kasra Military Council; Manbij Military Council; Tabqa Military Council; Sireen Military Council; Al-Bab Military Council | Saraya Ansar al-Sunnah; Hayat Ansar al-Tawhid al-Islamiyah: Firqat al-Ghuraba; Minbar Ansar Al-Rasoul; Islamic State; Military of the Islamic State; Al-Qaeda; Ajnad Bayt al-Maqdis | Israel Defense Forces; Israeli Ground Forces; 36th Division; 7th Brigade; 98th Division; 35th Brigade; Oz Brigade; 210th Division; 474th Brigade; 810th Brigade; Israeli Air Force; 7th Wing; Unit 5101; Unit 669; Israeli Navy; Administrative Council of Jabal Bashan (Note: Replaced the Supreme Legal Committee in Suwayda); Internal security forces; National Guard; Suwayda Military Council; Border Guard Brigade; Men of Dignity; Al-Jabal Brigade; Sheikh al-Karama Forces; Other Druze groups; Jaramana Shield Brigade; National Guard Forces; (Israel) Pioneers of Bashan |

== See also ==
- Armed factions in the Syrian civil war
- 2024 Israeli invasion of Syria
