= Southern Syria clashes (April–May 2025) =

- Part of the Aftermath of the Syrian civil war and Druze insurgency in Southern Syria
Date	28 April – 4 May 2025 (6 days)
Location	Jaramana, Sahnaya, and Ashrafiyat Sahnaya in Rif Dimashq Governorate, and multiple villages in Suwayda Governorate, Syria (Note: With Israeli airstrikes related to the clashes targeting locations also in Daraa and Hama Governorates.)
Result	Inconclusive: Agreement reached, including integration of Druze fighters within the Syrian General Security Service; Continuation of clashes in July

Belligerents
Syria Bedouin tribes	Druze armed groups Israel

Commanders and leaders
(Syria) Ahmed al-Sharaa (Syria) Hussam al-Tahhan	Hikmat al-Hijri; Tareq al-Shoufi Benjamin Netanyahu; Israel Katz

Units involved
(Syria) Syrian Armed Forces (Syria) General Security Service Al-Qaraan clan Al-Uqaydat clan	Jaramana Shield Brigade; Suwayda Military Council (Note: Alleged by Syrian state media): Israel Defense Forces; Israeli Air Force

Casualties and losses
(Syria) 32 killed, (Note: 21 from security forces in Ashrafiyat Sahnaya; 10 from groups affiliated with the Ministry of Defense in Jaramana; 1 from groups affiliated with the Ministry of Defense in Suwayda) several wounded	89 Druze armed fighters killed (Note: 25 in Ashrafiyat Sahnaya; 7 in Jaramana; 5 in Al-Sour village, Suwayda Governorate; 48 ambushed in Suwayda Governorate on the Damascus-Suwayda motorway; 4 Druze killed in Suwayda's countryside by a bombing from an unidentified drone, which the Syrian state media reported it was Israeli) (Israel) None
- 18 civilians killed (Note: 1 Druze by mortar fire in Rasas; 3 civilians, including one Druze child, one Druze man, and a man from Deir ez-Zor in Ashrafiyat Sahnaya; 14 Druze executed by forces allegedly affiliated with the Syrian ministries of defence and interior in Sahnaya and Ashrafiyat Sahnaya according to the SOHR)

The Southern Syria clashes began on 28 April 2025. The initial clashes erupted in the city of Jaramana following tensions related to the circulation of a controversial audio recording, and quickly escalated to nearby areas of Sahnaya and Ashrafiyat Sahnaya, and on 30 April to multiple villages in Suwayda Governorate. After de-escalation efforts, an agreement was reached to end the fighting on 1 May. Israel conducted airstrikes against Syrian government targets on 30 April and again on 2–3 May, the latter triggering Turkish efforts to jam the Israeli comms systems. Sporadic fighting continued in to May, along with two Islamic State bombings in late May. Clashes would be renewed in July 2025.

== Background ==
Clashes broke out in late February 2025 in Jaramana between Druze militias and the General Security Service.

Tensions continued in late April 2025 after the spread of an offensive audio recording allegedly containing blasphemous content against the Islamic prophet Muhammad, allegedly attributed to a Druze scholar named Marwan Kiwan, who disavowed it. The recording sparked public outrage across the region. The Religious Council of the Druze in Suwayda swiftly condemned the recording and disavowed the individual, while the Syrian Ministry of Interior launched an official investigation, later confirming that the accused person was not responsible for the recording.

The Suwayda Military Council, the Supreme Forces and Sheikh al-Karama Forces voiced ambivalence towards the Sharaa administration, while other Druze groups, including Ahrar Jabal al-Arab, the Sultan Pasha al-Atrash Battalion and the group led by Laith al-Balous, have expressed an openness towards working with it.

According to activist Samih al-Awam, Suwayda is broadly divided into three factions; civil society movements are generally supportive of the president, while various armed factions, including Men of Dignity, Al-Jabal Brigade, Balous Forces, and Ahrar Jabal al-Arab are also supportive of the al-Sharaa administration. Four groups allied with Hikmat al-Hijri are in favor of decentralization.

== Timeline ==
=== Clashes in Jaramana ===
The first incident occurred at approximately 2:00 a.m. on 28 April 2025, when an unidentified group opened fire on a local militia checkpoint near the "Al-Naseem" intersection at the entrance of Jaramana. Gunfire continued and intensified around 4:00 a.m., leading to the deaths of at least two members of the security forces and six residents of the city. Over ten others were injured in the initial wave of violence.

Local factions imposed heightened security measures, erecting checkpoints and restricting movement into and out of the city. A statement circulated on social media, attributed to the residents of Jaramana, condemned the violence and sectarian incitement, while urging official authorities to investigate and punish those responsible.

=== Clashes in Sahnaya and Ashrafiyat Sahnaya ===
On 29 April 2025, clashes expanded to the Druze-majority towns of Sahnaya and Ashrafiyat Sahnaya. Armed groups attacked multiple security checkpoints using light weapons and RPGs. The fighting briefly paused, but continued after reinforcements arrived from Daraa.

Hussam Waruar, the head of the Sahnaya Municipality, was killed along with his son on 1 May by unidentified gunmen. Authorities announced the opening of an investigation into the incident, amid uncertainty and speculation regarding the identity of those responsible. The Syrian Observatory for Human Rights claimed that the two were killed by government-affiliated groups.

=== Israeli involvement 29–30 April ===
On 29 April Israeli Druze in northern Israel staged protests to force an Israeli military intervention in Syria, in order to protect the Druze community living there.

Amidst the unrest on 30 April, Israeli media reported limited drone strikes targeting alleged armed elements in Sahnaya, purportedly as a warning measure. These strikes reportedly targeted a group allegedly preparing attacks against the Druze community. No casualties were reported by Israeli sources.

Israeli Prime Minister Benjamin Netanyahu, alongside Defence Minister Israel Katz, stated in a joint announcement that the airstrike in Sahnaya was a "warning operation". They stated that the strike was intended to send a clear message to the Syrian government, asserting that Israel expects it to take action to protect the Druze community.

A second Israeli strike, which utilized an Elbit Hermes 450 UAV, killed a member of the Syrian security forces and injured others.

=== Clashes in Suwayda ===
On the evening on 30 April, armed groups attacked Druze-majority villages of Ira, Rasas, and as-Sawra al-Kabira, and shelled Kanaker in Suwayda Governorate and clashed with local Druze armed groups. Syrian government forces were soon after deployed to the area to restore stability. The attackers were later reportedly identified to be linked to the Syrian Ministry of Defense.

In as-Sawra al-Kabira, the shrine and museum of Issam Zahreddine, a late Druze military officer and former commander of the Syrian Republican Guard who had a poor reputation as part of the Ba'athist regime's forces, was burned and destroyed by unknown attackers, the building was eventually blown up.

On 1 May, Hikmat al-Hijri, one of the Druze religious leaders in Syria, (Note: Spiritual leadership of the Druze in Syria is split into two since the 2010s, one is headed by al-Hijri, the other is mutually headed by Hammoud al-Hinnawi and Youssef Jarbou.) issued a statement criticizing the Syrian government. Al-Hijri accused the regime of committing atrocities against its own citizens through what he described as "takfiri militias affiliated with the government". He claimed there was a broad consensus among Syrians about the regime's oppressive conduct and called for urgent international intervention. In his statement, al-Hijri lamented the lack of tangible political reforms following recent protests and resistance efforts in Suwayda, stating that five months had passed since what he called the "liberation from oppression", referring to the fall of the Assad regime, yet there had been no progress toward a new constitution or a decentralized civil state that guarantees justice and freedom. He declared that the Syrian government no longer represents its people, describing its forces as "tools of killing, kidnapping, and sectarian incitement", and concluded by stating that international protection had become a legitimate right for a population "decimated by massacres".

In the early hours of 2 May, unidentified armed groups launched mortar attacks on the villages of Harran and Lubayn and other nearby villages, followed by an attempted ground incursion. Local Druze factions repelled the assault. The Syrian government later stated that the assailants were unaffiliated with state forces and described them as "outlaw groups".

An attack was launched on the Druze village of Al-Thaalah on 4 May. Druze factions responded with their own mortars, as well as machine gun fire, though several hours later, the attack continued. According to a native of Ad-Dara, a neighboring village, the Druze attacked first.

=== De-escalation efforts ===
The Grand Mufti of Syria, Sheikh Osama al-Rifai, issued a statement on 30 April warning against the dangers of internal strife, in response to the events. Al-Rifai urged Syrians to reject calls for revenge and sectarian incitement, emphasizing that "fitna (discord) is easy to start but its consequences are unknown". He stressed that the blood of all Syrians is sacred and that even a single drop should not be spilled. Al-Rifai cautioned against heeding voices that seek to ignite conflict, describing them as "the voice of Satan" and calling instead for restraint and the preservation of national unity.

Walid Jumblatt, a Lebanese Druze prominent politician, said on 30 April that he was conducting intensive contacts as part of his efforts to achieve a ceasefire.

A delegation of Druze sheikhs and dignitaries from Suwayda Governorate arrived to the Ashrafiyat Sahnaya area on 30 April, the group included the Governor of Suwayda as well as the two spiritual leaders of the Druze community, Hammoud al-Hinnawi and Youssef Jarbou. The delegation convened a meeting to achieve de-escalation.

=== Agreements and government response ===
A meeting between government officials and Druze representatives on 29 April resulted in an agreement to de-escalate the situation in Jaramana, hold the attackers accountable, and counter sectarian mobilization.

On the evening of 30 April, Syrian media reported that the Governors of Rif Dimashq, Suwayda, and Quneitra, along with a number of dignitaries and social figures, had reached a preliminary agreement stipulating a ceasefire in Jaramana and Ashrafiyat Sahnaya.

On 1 May, a meeting was held in Suwayda bringing together Druze religious figures, local notables, and faction representatives, including all three spiritual leaders of the Druze community in Syria. Following the gathering, a joint statement was issued reaffirming their rejection of any form of partition, separation, or secession. The statement further called for the activation of the roles of the Syrian Ministry of Interior and the judiciary within the Suwayda Governorate, with them being from the local population, and urged the Syrian state to ensure security along the Suwayda–Damascus road. Shortly after the meeting, an agreement had been reached to activate the role of the Ministry of Interior in the Suwayda Governorate, alongside several other measures aimed at restoring stability. The agreement also included handover of heavy weapons in Jaramana to the state, a reinforcement of security forces in the city, the gradual prohibition of all unauthorized weapons, and the deployment of Ministry of Defense units on the outskirts of the city to safeguard its perimeter.

Following the agreement, local Druze factions submitted a list of 1,500 candidates to join the Syrian general security forces. As of 2 May 700 of these individuals had been accepted and subsequently deployed across Suwayda Governorate to support efforts aimed at restoring stability.

On 3 May, the spiritual leadership of the Druze community in Syria in its two branches, issued a statement stating the main points of the agreement as follows:

- Activating the Internal Security Forces (police) from former members of the Internal Security Forces, and activating the judicial system exclusively from the people of Sweida Governorate, with immediate effect.
- Lifting the siege on the areas of Suwayda, Jaramana, Sahnaya, and Ashrafiyat Sahnaya, and restoring normal life immediately.
- Securing the Damascus-Suwayda road and ensuring its safety and security, under the authority's responsibility, with immediate effect.
- A ceasefire in all areas.
- Any declaration that violates or exceeds these provisions will be considered unilateral.

Factions associated with al-Hijri called a general mobilization.

=== Renewed Israeli strikes and Turkish involvement, 2–3 May ===
In the early hours of 2 May, Israeli aircraft dropped a bomb in the vicinity of the presidential palace in Damascus, which Netanyahu and Katz confirmed in a joint statement and described the attack as a clear message to the Syrian regime, vowing to "not allow forces to be sent south of Damascus" and warning against threats to the Druze community in Syria.

Statements of condemnation of the strike were issued by Qatar, Saudi Arabia, Kuwait, Jordan, Iraq, the Muslim World League, the Gulf Cooperation Council, the Arab League, the Arab Parliament, the United Nations, and the Syrian Presidency.

Later in the day, Israeli authorities announced that they were preparing to target additional sites inside Syria, including military and regime targets.

On the same day, an explosion struck a farm in the western countryside of Suwayda. Initial reports suggested the blast may have been linked to an unidentified drone heard flying over the area, possibly of Israeli origin. Four individuals were killed as a result of the explosion. The Israeli Army Radio denied carrying any airstrike on the area. However, Syrian state media attributed the attack to Israel, alleging that the victims were members of a local Druze armed group responsible for defending the area and they attempted to shoot down the drone but came under fire moments later.

On the evening of 2 May, and the early hours of 3 May, Israeli aircraft entered Syrian airspace from Lebanon and attacked multiple sites in Governorates of Rif Dimashq, Hama, and Daraa, resulting in at least one civilian death and four injuries. At the same time, Turkish fighter jets were reported to be flying over the Syria–Turkey border in Idlib and Aleppo Governorates. Turkish media outlets reported that the Turkish fighter jets flew over Hama and Homs Governorates, issuing warning signals to Israeli aircraft to exit Syrian airspace, and deploying electronic jamming measures.

An Israeli Air Force helicopter was reported to have landed in Suwayda Governorate and transported five injured Druze to receive treatment at Ziv Hospital in Safed, where 10 other wounded Syrian Druze had been taken in previous days. The Israeli military also stated that troops are "deployed to southern Syria and prepared to prevent hostile forces from entering the area and Druze villages".

Several weeks later, the Israeli TV network i24NEWS reported that the Israeli helicopter which landed in Suwayda on 2 May had retrieved documents, photographs, and personal belongings associated with Israeli spy Eli Cohen, who was executed in Damascus in 1965. While Israeli authorities had previously confirmed that Mossad operatives cooperated with an unnamed foreign intelligence service to obtain the material, i24NEWS said that a high-ranking Syrian security official in the region facilitated the operation. According to the report, the archive's transfer to Israel was authorized by Syrian leader Ahmed al-Sharaa as a deliberate gesture of goodwill toward both Israel and the United States. Previously, Reuters confirmed that the handover of Cohen's belongings was done with the approval of the Syrian leadership.

Amid the wave of Israeli airstrikes on the evening of 2 May, and the early hours of 3 May, Turkish fighter jets reportedly issued electronic warning signals and jammed the systems of Israeli aircraft operating in Syrian airspace, attempting to push them out. The Israeli strikes targeted multiple locations in the Governorates of Daraa, Rif Dimashq and Hama, resulting in civilian casualties—one person was killed and several others wounded near Harasta and Al-Tall.

Turkey has increasingly voiced concern over Israel's military operations in Syria, viewing them as a threat to regional stability and to its own national interests. Just days earlier, Turkey’s Foreign Ministry had called for an end to the Israeli strikes, urging a focus on Syria’s security and unity.

=== Incidents after the agreement ===
Unknown groups attacked the village of Al-Tha'lah on 4 May 2025, which the Men of Dignity responded to.

On 6 May 2025, an ambush in the village of al-Dour, located in western Suwayda Governorate, resulted in the deaths of two members of the General Security forces and injuries to four others. The incident occurred as security personnel were transporting two injured Suwayda residents who had previously been wounded in clashes on the Suwayda-Damascus highway and had received medical treatment in Daraa Governorate. According to Syrian state media, the ambush was carried out by the Suwayda Military Council. However, the military council denied any role, labeling the claims as part of a media smear campaign.

On 21 May 2025, an armed group, "led by Fadi Nasr, with support from Tariq al-Nagoush", took Mustafa al-Bakour, the governor of Suwayda governorate, hostage at the town hall, demanding and securing the release of Raghib Qarqout, who is a convicted car thief. The Men of Dignity movement was mobilised and secured the governor's exit route from the building, while the Al-Jabal Brigade engaged with the gunmen. Al-Bakour submitted his resignation two days later.

=== Islamic State involvement and other violence, late May ===
Two attacks were carried out by the Islamic State (ISIS) in the al-Safa region of Suwayda Governorate in Southern Syria in late May. The first bombing on 22 May targeted Syrian government forces, while the second, on 28 May, targeted fighters from the U.S.-backed Syrian Free Army. Although ISIS had lost most of its territory in Syria by 2019, it had continued to operate in remote desert regions like in southern Syria. Until May 2025, ISIS had mostly attacked Kurdish forces in the northeast. The bombings in Al-Safa marked the group’s first known attacks against the new government and its allies, showing that ISIS still posed a serious threat.

22 May 2025 Southern Syria bombing
- Part of the Syrian civil war
- Location: al-Safa, Suwayda Governorate, Syria
- Date: 22 May 2025
- Target: (Syria) Syrian Armed Forces
- Deaths: 1 civilian
- Injuries: 3 soldiers
- Perpetrator: Islamic State
- First attack against the Syrian transitional government claimed by ISIS.

On 22 May 2025, ISIS detonated a car bomb targeted a vehicle belonging to Syrian government forces in the Al-Safa region of Suwayda Governorate—a remote desert area in southern Syria. The group claimed the bombing killed or wounded seven soldiers,however, the Britain-based Syrian Observatory for Human Rights said that the attack on government forces had only killed one civilian and wounded three soldiers.

It is the first such attack to be claimed by ISIS against the Syrian transitional government since the fall of the 54-year Assad family's rule in December.

28 May 2025 Southern Syria bombing
- Part of the Syrian civil war
- Location: al-Safa, Suwayda Governorate, Syria
- Date: 28 May 2025
- Target: (Syria) Syrian Free Army
- Deaths: 1 soldier
- Injuries: 3 soldiers
- Perpetrator: Islamic State

On 28 May 2025, ISIS carried out a bombing in the Al-Safa region of Suwayda Governorate, targeting fighters from the U.S.-backed Syrian Free Army. The group used an improvised explosive device (IED) to strike a FSA vehicle, claiming to have killed one fighter and wounded three others.

Also on 28 May 2025, a former commander of the disbanded Eighth Brigade was found in critical condition near a hospital in Izra after being shot in the side, suggesting an attempted execution by his kidnappers before local residents rescued him and took him for urgent treatment. Earlier the same day, unidentified gunmen in a vehicle with shaded windows opened fire on another former Eighth Brigade commander in Bosra, eastern Daraa countryside, and kidnapped him; it remains unclear whether he was injured or killed, and his fate is still unknown.

On 29 May 2025, an explosive device planted on the side of the Ariqa-Najran road in the western countryside of Suwayda Governorate exploded as an ambulance belonging to the Suwayda Health Directorate was passing by. The explosion resulted in six civilians being injured, including two women and two members of the ambulance crew (the driver and a paramedic). The vehicle was also almost completely destroyed, putting it out of service.

== Extrajudicial killings of Druze ==
On 29 April, armed groups said to be affiliated with the Ministry of Defense were reported to have executed civilians at a poultry facility on the outskirts of Sahnaya. On 1 May, the number of reported field executions in Ashrafiyat Sahnaya increased to nine. Eight of the executions were carried out inside the poultry facility while another targeted a man in his house.

On 2 May, the latest number reported of Druze civilians extrajudicially executed was 10, the Syrian Observatory for Human Rights claimed that they were killed by forces affiliated with the Syrian ministries of defence and interior in Sahnaya and Ashrafiyat Sahnaya.

Armed Druze fighters were headed to Sahnaya to reinforce the Druze there, but they were ambushed in Burraq on the Damascus-Suwayda motorway. Some of the bodies of Druze armed fighters who were ambushed were burnt and others mutilated while the perpetrators reportedly chanted anti-Druze slogans.

== See also ==
- Israeli invasion of Syria (2024–present)
- Western Syria clashes
  - March 2025 Western Syria clashes
  - 2025 massacres of Syrian Alawites
- Mar Elias Church attack
