= Southern Syria conflict (2025–present) =

Conflict in Syria that started in 2025

- Part of the Aftermath of the Syrian civil war
- Military situation as of 19 February 2026 Syrian transitional government Druze factions Israeli occupation and invasion (Note: Israel occupied the Golan Heights after 1967, de facto annexing the region in 1981, but the territory is not recognized as part of Israel by the United Nations or any member states except Israel and the United States. Israel launched a new invasion of Syria on 8 December 2024 during the fall of Damascus, taking advantage of the power vacuum created by the fall of the Assad regime to increase the amount of territory it controlled by several hundred square miles.)
Date	28 February 2025 – present (1 year, 8 months and 3 days)
Location	Jaramana, Sahnaya, and Ashrafiyat in Rif Dimashq Governorate, Suwayda Governorate (Note: Israel conducted airstrikes in the governorates of Suwayda, Daraa, Damascus, Rif Dimashq and Latakia)
Status	Ongoing: Allegations of a blockade on As-Suwayda

Belligerents
Administrative Council of Jabal Bashan (from 2026); Supreme Legal Committee in Suwayda (until 2026); Anti-government Druze armed groups; Israel	Syria (caretaker and transitional governments); Pro-government Druze armed groups (from July 2025); Bedouin tribes; Jordan	(al-Qaeda) Minbar Ansar Al-Rasoul Islamic State

Commanders and leaders
Hikmat al-Hijri; Jihad Ghoutani (surrendered); Tareq al-Shoufi; Mazid Khaddaj; Shakib Ajwad Nasr; Shadi Fayez Murshid; Marwan Kiwan; Marhej Shaheen †; Benjamin Netanyahu; Israel Katz	(Syria) Ahmed al-Sharaa; Murhaf Abu Qasra; Ali al-Naasan; Hussam al-Tahhan; Anas Khattab; Ahmed al-Dalati; Abu Bahig al-Mahamed; Ammar Hilal Abu Hamza; Abdullah Al-Najm; Moammar Ibrahim †; Abu Yaqub Mahja †; Khaled al-Zoabi †; Abd al-Fatah al-Musayfara †; Tareq al-Shoufi (alleged); Suleiman Abdul Baqi; Laith al-Balous; Abdul-Moneim al-Nassif; Rakan Al-Khudair; Abdullah II; Mohammad Hyasat; Yousef Huneiti	(Islamic State) Abu Hudhayfah

Units involved
Administrative Council of Jabal Bashan (Note: Replaced the Supreme Legal Committee in Suwayda); National Guard; Suwayda Military Council; Border Guard Brigade; Men of Dignity; Sheikh al-Karama Forces; Al-Jabal Brigade; Small groups (Note: Gathering of the Mountain's Sons, Mountain Youth Relief, Al-Ulya Forces, Local Forces, Mount Tod Forces, The Conquerors, Den of the Mountain Forces, Hamza Knights Forces, Southern Sun Forces, Dhiab Hamza Forces, Al-Fahd Forces, Guardians of the Frontiers, Sultan Forces, Sword of Justice Forces, Al-Ghayara Relief, Al-Nashama Relief, Shield of al-Lajat Forces, As-Suwayda Operations Room, Khayyal Group, Thunder Banner – Ta'ara, Shield of the, Mountain Forces – Zain al-Din, Banner Relief – Activated Mountain Tribes, Druze Protection Units, Al-Asail Forces, Unified Army, Unitarian Popular Resistance, Southern Shield Forces, Mountain Shield Forces, Lions of the Mountain Forces, Shield of Tawhid, Sahwat al-Khedr Shield, Mimas and Tal al-Lawz, Men of al-Lajat, Men of al-Kafr, the 164th Brigade and Shahba Operations Room); Internal Security Forces; Jaramana Shield Brigade; National Guard Forces; Israel Defense Forces; Israeli Air Force	Ministry of Defense; Syrian Armed Forces; Syrian Army; 40th Div.; 54th Div.; 62nd Div.; 70th Div.; 72nd Div.; 12th Brig.; 107th Brig.; Military Police; Ministry of Interior; ISF; (Syria) Burkan al-Furat; Ahrar Jabal al-Arab; Guest House of Dignity; Bedouin tribes; Syrian Council of Tribes and Clans; Southern Tribes Gathering; Anizah; Bani Khalid; Al-Bu Nasir; Mawali; Nu'aym; Shammar; Al-Uqaydat; Al-Busraya; Al-Shaitat; Al-Marsoumi; Zubaid; Bani Sakher; Tayy; Jubur; Sardiyah clan; Al-Fawa’ra clan; Tribes of Hauran; Tribes of Lajat; Al-Qaraan clan; (Jordan) Jordanian Armed Forces; Royal Jordanian Air Force (Note: See Operation Jordanian Deterrence)	Military of the Islamic State

Strength
12,000 fighters	(Syria) 100,000+ soldiers and fighters 50,000 Bedouin fighters	(Islamic State) 15 militants

Casualties and losses
647 fighters killed (Note: 89 killed in May, 558 killed in July.) (Israel) Israeli Druze arrested in Daraa	(Syria) 485 soldiers and policemen killed (Note: 2 killed in March, 32 killed in May, 451 killed in July.); 41 Bedouins killed	Unknown
- 190 civilians killed (Note: 18 killed in May, 172 killed in July); 768 civilians killed in extrajudicial executions (Note: 765 Druze, including 69 women, 15 children, and 1 elderly man, executed by government forces.); 200,000 displaced persons

The Southern Syria conflict is an ongoing conflict in southern Syria between Druze militias and the Syrian transitional government. Since the fall of the Assad regime, the conflict has centered around control of Druze-majority areas in Suwayda Governorate and conflict with local Muslim Bedouins. In October 2025, The New York Times reported that over 1,300 people had been killed in the violence, mostly Druze civilians.

Following demonstrations of the Druze minority in Israel, demanding government action to protect the Druze of Syria against alleged persecution, Israel launched airstrikes in support of the Druze. There are accusations that the transitional government is imposing a blockade on the self-governed, Druze-majority regions, and that this blockade intensified in late August 2026.

== Background ==
The Druze largely remained neutral during the Syrian civil war. There are communities in Lebanon, Israel and Golan Heights, representing about three percent of Syria's population.

On 31 December 2024, the As-Suwayda Joint Operations Room did not allow a convoy from the Syrian transitional government to enter Suwayda, after coordinating with the leader of the Ahrar Jabal al-Arab, Suleiman Abdul Baqi.

The local Druze factions were excluded from the Syrian Revolution Victory Conference, where it was attended by the commanders of various armed revolutionary factions that fought for the Syrian opposition coalition against the deposed regime of Bashar al-Assad, in January 2025.

In February 2025, local sources in Syria's Quneitra Governorate reported to Al Arabiya alleging that that the IDF had extended "tempting offers" of employment opportunities to residents of Syria.

Druze factions in Syria are divided in their approach to the new authorities, ranging from cautious to outright rejection. In March 2025, Bahaa al-Jamal, a Druze commander in Suwayda, stated that massacres of Syrian Alawites by pro-government Islamist fighters had led to insecurity for other minorities, but the Druze had significant military capabilities with "thousands of military personnel" and the right to defend themselves if confronted by government forces.

Tensions continued in late April 2025 after the spread of an offensive audio recording allegedly containing blasphemous content against the Islamic prophet Muhammad, allegedly attributed to a Druze scholar named Marwan Kiwan, who disavowed it.

== Timeline ==
=== 2025 ===
==== February ====
On 28 February 2025, unidentified armed individuals fired upon a vehicle carrying Druze civilians traveling on a road leading to Damascus International Airport within Jaramana. Two elderly individuals suffered injuries in this attack, and were both hospitalized. In response to these incidents, the General Security Service initiated a comprehensive security operation throughout Jaramana beginning on 28 February. Security forces reinforced positions at city entry points and deployed substantial personnel numbers around Jaramana to pursue suspected individuals considered responsible for the violence. Reports indicated that security forces intended to storm into Jaramana.

==== March ====
On 1 March, clashes broke out between Syrian caretaker government forces and local Druze armed groups responsible for community protection in Jaramana, during the security operation launched by Syrian authorities on the suburb. Members of the Jaramana Shield Brigade were involved in the clashes. During a violent altercation which erupted in Al-Seuof Square between two General Security Service members and local armed residents, one local gunman sustained serious injuries, requiring hospitalization, while authorities took the two security personnel into custody.

In the clash at Al-Seuof Square, the wounded local gunman was taken to Al-Mujtahed Hospital for medical treatment. But Hay'at Tahrir al-Sham militants arrived at the hospital where the situation escalated when one of the wounded man's escorts allegedly made blasphemous remarks about Allah. This prompted members of Hayat Tahrir al-Sham present at the hospital to physically assault and subsequently detain the companions, resulting in one confirmed fatality among security forces.

The clashes ended on 2 March 2025, after the entry of General Security Service into Jaramana.

A meeting was held in March 2025 between Druze spiritual leader Hikmat al-Hijri, Yahya Al-Hajjar, the head of the Men of Dignity, Suleiman Abdul Baqi, the leader of Ahrar Jabal al-Arab, and Shakib Azam, the leader of Al-Jabal Brigade, in which it was agreed that the General Security Service would be "re-activated" in the governorate, as long as the people involved were from Suwayda. The Guest House of Dignity also announced its support for the initiative, in response to the initiative, other Druze militias threatened to burn general security vehicles.

==== April ====
The incidents began in Jaramana at approximately 2:00 a.m. on 28 April 2025, when an unidentified group opened fire on a local militia checkpoint near the "Al-Naseem" intersection at the entrance of Jaramana. Gunfire continued and intensified around 4:00 a.m., leading to the deaths of at least two members of the security forces and six residents of the city. Over ten others were injured in the initial wave of violence. Local factions imposed heightened security measures, erecting checkpoints and restricting movement into and out of the city.

On 29 April 2025, clashes expanded to the Druze-majority towns of Sahnaya and Ashrafiyat Sahnaya. Armed groups attacked multiple security checkpoints using machine guns and RPGs. The fighting briefly paused, but continued after reinforcements arrived from Daraa. Hussam Waruar, the head of the Sahnaya Municipality, was killed along with his son on 1 May by unidentified gunmen. The unidentified groups killed the Druze leader, Wajdi al-Hajj Ali, who was shot in the head and died on 30 April 2025 before reaching the hospital.

===== Massacres in Southern Syria (April 2025) =====
According to the Syrian Observatory for Human Rights, the Ministry of Defense executed civilians at a poultry farm outside the town of Sahnaya.

The SOHR stated that the Ministry of Defense ambushed Druze coming from Suwayda towards Sahnaya, resulting in 43 deaths. Some of the bodies were burned and others mutilated while the perpetrators (from the Ministry of Interior) reportedly chanted anti-Druze slogans.

==== May ====
Clashes erupted between Sweida factions, and armed groups gathered around the village of Kanaker, west of Sweida. This coincided with clashes in the towns of Ira, Rasas and al-Soura al-Kabira. The shrine and museum of Issam Zahreddine, a late Druze military officer and former commander of the Syrian Republican Guard, was vandalized and burned in al-Soura al-Kabira. General security vehicles were ambushed on 7 May by what state media called "outlaw groups" affiliated with the Suwayda Military Council. Druze leader Hikmat al-Hijri declared that "There is no consensus between us and the Damascus government". That same day, videos were released showing Burkan al-Furat, a group from Deir ez-Zor, bombing the city of Suwayda and the "al-Hijri militias" from Daraa Governorate. According to activist Samer Salloum, it was the Syrian transitional government that allowed entry into the south.

On 21 May 2025, an armed group, "led by Fadi Nasr, with support from Tariq al-Nagoush", took Mustafa al-Bakour, the governor of Suwayda governorate, hostage at the town hall, demanding and securing the release of Raghib Qarqout, who is a convicted car thief. The Men of Dignity movement was mobilised and secured the governor's exit route from the building, while the Al-Jabal Brigade engaged with the gunmen. Al-Bakour submitted his resignation two days later.

On 22 May, the Islamic State claimed attacks in Al-Safa, in Suwayda Governorate, against the Ministry of Defense, being the first attack by the Islamic State against the Syrian transitional government, since the Fall of Assad.

==== June ====
On 2 June, unidentified groups attacked a General Security Service checkpoint in Ashrafiyat Sahnaya, in Rif Dimashq Governorate, killing 3 of them.

On 10 June, the city of Umm Dhibi, in rural Suwayda, was attacked with mortars, but no injuries were reported.

On 24 June, Mustafa al-Bakour resumed his post as governor of the Suwayda governorate and met with al-Hijri in Qanawat and Hammoud al-Hinnawi at Al-Hikma hospital.

==== July ====
The violence began on 11 July, after a Druze vegetable merchant was assaulted by members of Bedouin tribes after they set up an improvised roadblock. The Bedouin attackers subjected him to sectarian insults and repeated death threats during his detention. He was later released to a remote village while blindfolded and in critical condition. In response, local Druze armed groups detained several individuals from Bedouin tribes the next day in an effort to recover the stolen property. This initiated a cycle of retaliatory kidnappings between the two sides, which quickly escalated into open armed clashes.

On 13 July, the Bedouin fighters responded by establishing a checkpoint in the al-Maqwas neighborhood in eastern Suwayda city, where they captured several members of the local Druze armed groups. Armed clashes soon erupted between the two sides in and around the area, the clashes spread to at-Tira, al-Mazraa, and as-Sawra al-Kabira. Bedouins from Daraa Governorate arrived to the area to assist the Bedouin fighters.

On 14 July, video was released showing a General Security vehicle, including a person making sectarian statements, declaring his participation in the conflict. Hikmat al-Hijri issued a statement demanding an urgent call for international protection, reiterating the leadership's rejection of any security force entering their areas, the General Security Service and another unidentified agency, accusing them of crossing into the province under the pretext of providing protection while bombing border villages and supporting extremist groups with heavy weaponry and drones. Shelling was reported in the neighboring Daraa Governorate, in which four civilians were wounded by a Druze group from the town of Al-Thaalah and among the villages controlled by Druze groups. Israeli aircraft were seen conducting low-altitude flights over the western countryside of Suwayda, deploying flares, the Israeli Army later announced that it had struck multiple tanks belonging to the Syrian Army in Suwayda Governorate. However a tank was repaired and was deployed again in an hour, The Syrian Arab News Agency reported a total of three Israeli strikes.

On 15 July, the Syrian Minister of Defense announced that a ceasefire had been reached with Druze spiritual leadership in Suwayda to cooperate with the Interior and Defense Forces and to surrender their weapons, though it was denied by Hikmat al-Hijri who declared that he would "resist this brutal campaign by all available means", including women, children, and elderly fighting, accusing government forces of violating the ceasefire by shelling Suwayda. Israel conducted further strikes in al-Mazraa after the Syrian Armed Forces took control of the town. Strikes were also reported on the outskirts of Suwayda. Intensive airstrikes continued across Suwayda following the announcement of a ceasefire. The airstrikes targeted military equipment and convoys. One Syrian army convoy was struck in Suwayda, resulting in at least one casualty. The Mar Mikhael Church in the town of as-Sawra al-Kabira was robbed, vandalized, and burned. The group Men of Dignity announced over 50 of their members killed or injured in Suwayda clashes.

On 16 July 2025, Sheikh Hikmat al-Hijri issued a statement, in which he appealed to Donald Trump, Benjamin Netanyahu, Mohammed bin Salman and Abdullah II to save Suwayda, stating that "the mask has fallen off the face of the ruling clique" and declaring, "we can no longer live with a regime that knows nothing of governance except iron and fire". Israel conducted airstrikes on several government buildings in Damascus, including the Syrian military headquarters, Israel Katz declared that the era of mere warnings in Damascus has ended, stating that "painful blows" will now be delivered to the Syrian government. Katz emphasized that the IDF will persistently and forcefully act in Suwayda to dismantle the forces responsible for attacking the Druze community until they fully withdraw. Addressing the Druze community in Israel, he reassured them that they can rely on the Israel Defense Forces for protection of their brethren in Syria, affirming that both he and Prime Minister Netanyahu have made a firm commitment to uphold this promise, The Syrian Ministry of Health reported three killed and 34 injured as a result of the attacks. The Druze Religious Authority in Suwayda (Note: Headed by sheikhs al-Hinnawi and Jarbou, and not by Sheikh al-Aql Hikmat al-Hijri.) announced it had reached a comprehensive agreement with the Syrian government to fully integrate the province within the Syrian state and reaffirm the state's sovereignty over the region. The agreement stipulates the restoration and activation of all government institutions in Suwayda. Additionally, the agreement provides for the withdrawal of army forces to their barracks, replacing them with internal security forces composed of local officers, the Syrian Ministry of Interior confirmed the ceasefire and the deployment of security checkpoints across the city as part of the reintegration process, Sheikh Hikmat al-Hijri issued a statement denying the existence of any agreement involving what he called "armed gangs falsely claiming to be the government." Addressing the people and "our heroic youth who defend the land, honor, and religion," the statement praised what he described as the "spirit of heroism and dignity" and urged continued resistance against the "criminal armed terrorist gangs," which he accused of committing murder, robbery, looting, and arson of homes, hospitals, and places of worship. The statement emphasized the importance of continuing "legitimate self-defense," calling for the struggle to continue "until the complete liberation of Suwayda Governorate from these gangs without conditions," presenting it as a national, humanitarian, and moral duty that admits no compromise. Al-Hijri also urged the "remnants" of armed opposition members to surrender, promising that those who do so will be under the protection of the spiritual leadership and "will not be humiliated or mistreated". There were protests in Jaramana with protestors chanting slogans against president Ahmed al-Sharaa and his government. The Syrian army began withdrawing from Suwayda. A statement by the Syrian Ministry of Defense said the withdrawal came after the army had completed operations against "outlaw groups" in the city. State news agency SANA reported the pullout was in line with the deal reached between the government and Druze religious leaders.

On 17 July, following the withdrawal of the Syrian army, Druze fighters reportedly discovered entire houses had been set on fire, families slaughtered inside homes, and looting. Witnesses in Suwayda compared the Syrian government's actions to summary executions. clashes between Bedouin and Druze fighters were also reported in the western countryside of Rif Dimashq Governorate. Clashes resumed in Suwayda after government forces withdrew as Bedouins launched new armed assaults on Druze forces, with the stated goal of releasing Bedouin prisoners of war. A Bedouin commander told Reuters that the ceasefire agreement did not bind his men, but only the forces of President Ahmed al-Shara's administration. According to the commander, his forces are aiming to free the Bedouins who were detained in recent days by the Druze fighters.

On 18 July, amid the large-scale attack by Bedouin fighters on Suwayda Governorate and reports of them entering Suwayda city, backed by fighters from the neighboring Daraa Governorate and other governorates in Syria, Hikmat al-Hijri reportedly demanded the Syrian government to send a conflict resolution force. Reports later circulated that Syrian government forces were preparing to redeploy in the city of Suwayda, following renewed clashes between Druze factions and Bedouin tribes. While an Israeli government related source said that Israel had agreed to a time-limited entry into Suwayda by Syrian government forces, the Syrian Interior Ministry denied that it was preparing to re-enter the city.

On 19 July, the Syrian government declared a ceasefire which was approved by the Druze leadership and Bedouin tribes. They arrived at the city of Suwayda but are having difficulty implementing the ceasefire. Fierce street fighting was documented in the city of Suwayda between Bedouins and Druze. AFP, which had teams on the ground, reported that the Bedouin militants had managed to break through the Druze defenses and penetrate the west of the city. An AFP correspondent in Suwayda reported seeing dozens of houses and cars set on fire, and gunmen setting shops on fire after looting them.

On 20 July, clashes were reported after the ceasefire in the towns of Al-Ariqah, Rimah, Hazem and Shahba, after an attack by tribal militias, especially in Al-Ariqah after the entry of tribal fighters with the help of General Security Service.

On 21 July, the Syrian Observatory for Human Rights said that nine civilians were injured by a drone attack on the city of Shahba by Bedouin tribes.

On 25 July, the Syrian Observatory for Human Rights reported ceasefire violations in Umm al-Zaytoun village and areas of Reema Hazem and in Walgha. Tensions persisted in the Kanaker region with the presence of tribal gunmen.

On 26 July, the spiritual leadership of the Druze, headed by Sheikh Hikmat al-Hijri, announced the formation of a "Supreme Legal Committee" consisting of six judges, including four judicial advisors, and three lawyers. The committee outlined its responsibilities as managing public affairs across all sectors in Suwayda, including administrative, security, and service-related matters.

==== August ====
On 3 August, what the transitional government called "illegal groups" reportedly violated the ceasefire agreement and attacked the Syrian Internal Security Forces. Fighting took place in Tal al-Hadid, with the Al-Jabal Brigade involved in the fighting.

On 8 August, clashes erupted in the town of Najran between Druze factions and an armed group, following an attack reportedly launched by the latter. The Syrian Observatory for Human Rights reported that the clashes resulted in the deaths of two people on both sides, along with material damage and the burning of several civilian homes, before the attackers withdrew.

On 10 August, the town of al-Majdal came under an assault from three directions, involving the use of heavy machine guns and mortar fire. One wave of the attack originated from the town of al-Mazraa, where government forces are stationed, while the other two approached from positions west of al-Majdal, firing heavy and medium machine guns toward the surrounding villages.

On 15 August, one woman from Suwayda was killed when unidentified armed assailants opened fire on the vehicle she was traveling in near the town of al-Kiheel in the eastern countryside of Daraa Governorate. She was en route with other passengers from Suwayda to Beirut via the highway passing through Daraa toward Damascus. The area where the incident took place was under the control of the Syrian government.

On 16 August, demonstrations took place in al-Karama Square in Suwayda. Protesters chanted slogans against "federalism" and demanded "full independence" for Syria, with slogans praising Hikmat al-Hijri.

On 23 August, the National Guard was formed, with the aim of consolidating military efforts to confront what it described as "Salafist-jihadist gangs", with large military groups such as Anti-Terrorism Force, Al-Jabal Brigade, Sheikh al-Karama Forces, the As-Suwayda Operations Room, Al-Fahd Forces, with small groups, (Note: Gathering of the Mountain's Sons, Mountain Youth Relief, Al-Ulya Forces, Local Forces, Mount Tod Forces, The Conquerors, Den of the Mountain Forces, Hamza Knights Forces, Southern Sun Forces, Dhiab Hamza Forces, Guardians of the Frontiers, Sultan Forces, Sword of Justice Forces, Al-Ghayara Relief, Al-Nashama Relief, Shield of al-Lajat Forces, Khayyal Group, Thunder Banner – Ta'ara, Shield of the, Mountain Forces – Zain al-Din, Banner Relief – Activated Mountain Tribes, Druze Protection Units, Al-Asail Forces, Unified Army) and the Jaysh al-Muwahhidin included.

On 25 August, according to Enab Baladi, other groups that later joined include "Men of Dignity, (Note: The Men of Dignity Movement "initially declined to join the new military formation". Later however, they "issued a statement welcoming the announcement of local factions uniting under an "organized military body", describing it as a necessary step at a time when the Druze community is defending its existence "against covetous invaders".) the Unitarian Popular Resistance, Southern Shield Forces, Mountain Shield Forces, Lions of the Mountain Forces, Shield of Tawhid, Sahwat al-Khedr Shield, Mimas and Tal al-Lawz, Men of al-Lajat and Men of al-Kafr", while 164th Brigade joined on 24 August, and the Suwayda Military Council joined on 27 August.

==== September ====
The Syrian Observatory for Human Rights reported that Firas Hamayel, a commander in the National Guard, was killed in an ambush in Suwayda.

On 21 September, Ayoob Kara, former member of the Israeli Knesset, announced the independence of Suwayda, declaring "We proclaim September 21, 2025, as the historic day of Suwayda’s separation from Syria and from the terrorist government of Ahmed Al-Sharaa".

On 26 September, the Syrian Druze militias established a local women's self-defense army as a response to the precarious security situation. More than 500 women are involved. Minors have been forcibly trained to use weapons.

On 27 September, the Syrian transitional government bombed the city of Mecdel with a drone and also bombed the city of Kanaker.

==== October ====
On 1 October, shootings broke out after the infiltration of drones belonging to Ministry of Defense.

On 7 October, the National Guard repelled an infiltration attempt by Syrian government forces in the town of Rima Hazem.

On 8 October, protesters in Shahba demonstrated in support of the residents of Ashrafieh and Sheikh Maqsoud, during its siege in Aleppo clashes, waving flags of Syrian Democratic Forces and banners reading: "The siege of Sheikh Maqsoud and Ashrafieh is a siege of Suwayda" and "Long live the resistance of the SDF!"

On 9 October, unknown Druze fighters attacked a government position in Walgha; the National Guard denied its participation.

On 10 October, Syrian government forces and the National Guard clashed in northern Suwayda, with 23 mm cannons.

On 11 October, a US delegation met with Hikmat al-Hijri and the National Guard, without the knowledge of Jihad Ghoutani, which created divisions in the National Guard. On the same day al-Hijri changed the name of Jabal al-Arab to "Jabal al-Bashan", a Hebrew term, which generated controversy in Suwayda, the matters were legally resolved by the National Guard.

On 20 October, the National Guard repelled an infiltration attempt by Syrian government forces with 23mm heavy machine guns towards the town of Majdal.

On 28 October, an attack occurred on a bus carrying Druze people on the Suwayda-Damascus highway, where two people, Aya Salam and Kamal Abdulbaqi, died. Hussam al-Tahhan declared: "This attack is a desperate attempt to destabilize security in the area and to terrorize citizens seeking stability."

==== November ====
On 7 November, the National Guard warned of ceasefire violations such as the bombing of civilian homes, the National Guard also shot down a drone loaded with explosives. The statement added that there were clashes in Rasas.

On 13 November, heavy fighting broke out in Al-Majdal, following the infiltration of Syrian government forces and drone attacks, prompting the National Guard to send reinforcements to the border. That same day, Syrian government forces attacked the Suwayda–Taara road, The skirmishes, which were the heaviest in months, were noticeable for the use of "drones, mortars, and heavy machine guns" by both sides. The "towns of Wolgha, Tal al-Aqra, Tal Hadid and al-Mazraa" were targeted by what the Syrian government called "outlaw forces".

On 19 November, Benjamin Netanyahu visited the areas occupied by Israel in the invasion of Syria, where he declared he would "protect the Druze allies in Jabal al-Druze".

On 20 November, a gang kidnapped five Druze people from Suwayda: Talal Dheeb, Reem Dheeb, Mahmouda Quraisha, Ilham Abu Zein Al-Din and Rafi Habib, who were released in Al-Musayfirah, Daraa Governorate. The gang leader was arrested. The kidnapped people were residents of As-Sawra as-Saghira. Hussam al-Tahhan stated that "the operation took place after careful monitoring on the ground and intensive surveillance and investigations".

On 30 November, the National Guard claimed a "coup d'état" by Raed al-Matni and Assem Abo Fakhr, where they were arrested together with people related to Syrian government forces, Sources indicated that the incident was an attempted assault on the government building and police headquarters, carried out by "Gandhi Abo Fakhr and a group affiliated with him, in coordination with Suleiman Abdul Baqi, with the aim of "overthrowing al-Sheikh al-Hijri".

==== December ====
On 1 December, the National Guard detained 10 people, including Sheikh Raed al-Matni, Assem Abou Fakher, Ghandi Abou Fakher, Maher Falhout, Hussam Zeidan, Zeidan Zeidan and Alameddine Zeidan, clarifying that they carried out a “swift and precise” operation to arrest what it called “traitors and conspirators”.

On 3 December, Sheikh Raed al-Matni's body was found with signs of torture, after being accused of having links with the Syrian government and Suleiman Abdul Baqi. The National Guard also raided al-Baqi's house, and promised a strong response. Sheikh Maher Falhout was also killed. The National Guard was reportedly behind the killings.

On 8 December, the National Guard reported mortar and drone attacks by the Syrian government forces, the affected areas are: Tel Hadid, Al-Maamel road and the Kanaker area. The National Guard declared that "the hostile fire and sources of fire were extinguished and full control of the situation on the field was restored".

On 15 December, the National Guard killed the poet Anwar al-Shaer, due to their criticism of the group, in Busan, Suwayda, he was taken to the Suweida National Hospital. His brother stated that "In a cowardly and treacherous operation, the martyr of the word of truth, Anwar Fawzat Al-Shaer, the free national revolutionary poet, was murdered in front of his house" and swore revenge.

On 19 December, the National Guard stated that Syrian government forces in Rimat Hazim and Al-Mazra'a launched attacks towards Al-Majdal with drones and mortar fire, injuring two civilians, in addition to an infiltration by Syrian government forces on the northwest axis, resulting in four wounded.

The National Guard accused Tareq al-Shoufi of "collaborating with Sharaa, and [he] went into hiding", while al-Hijri was "accused of kidnapping and his son of dealings with regional drug-smuggling networks, including Hezbollah."

On 23 December, the National Guard stated that the Syrian government forces had “continued their attacks against al-Jabal and the surrounding areas”, using mortar fire, heavy machine guns, and drones. The city of Attil was attacked with mortar fire from Rimat Hazem and Tel Hadid, causing two deaths and eight injuries. There was also an attack on the civilian prison of Suwayda and transport directorate using heavy machine guns and mortar fire.

On 24 December, clashes occurred between the National Guard and the Syrian government forces on the Ara-Khirbet Samar axis in the rural area of Suwayda and on the al-Majdal-al-Mazra'a axis, using 23mm heavy machine guns. That same day, the Royal Jordanian Air Force launched attacks on Suwayda that targeted “a series of factories and workshops that drug and arms traffickers use as bases to launch their illegal operations into Jordanian territory", It also attacked seven sites under the control of the National Guard, including a suspected weapons depot in Al Kafr, belonging to the Suwayda Military Council.

=== 2026 ===
==== January ====
On 3 January, four members of the "National Army" in Suwayda were attacked by mortars belonging to the General Security.

On 11 January, the Syrian government forces launched attacks toward Suwayda from Kanaker and Tal Hadid, and four civilians were injured. The injured were identified as Kinan Adel Al-Badeeish, Sami Salman Allameh, Majd Firas Jazan and Haitham Hani Mazhar.

On 24 January, the Syrian government forces reported the death of one of their members in clashes against the National Guard. The Syrian government forces also carried out a special operation in Suwayda to rescue three civilians kidnapped by the National Guard.

==== February ====
On 1 February, the Syrian government forces launched attacks toward Suwayda from the areas of Tal Hadid, Mansoura and Walgha, with four mortar shells. Clashes were reported between the National Guard and the Syrian government forces in the area of Mansour and the National Guard declared that it shot down a drone belonging to the Syrian government forces. A Syrian security source reported an attempted infiltration by what it called "outlaw gangs" in the area of Mansoura.

On 2 February, the Syrian internal security forces arrested Nasser Faisal Al-Saadi, a member of the National Guard, Eagles of the Whirlwind and Hezbollah, in addition to being the "biggest drug dealer in the region".

On 6 February, the Syrian government forces advanced towards the towns of Atil and Salim, reaching Sweida. A Syrian security source reported attacks toward al-Mazra'a. The Syrian government forces launched attacks toward al-Majdal with rocket launchers, killing the civilian Rani Basel Naeem.

On 7 February, a Syrian internal security force member shot and killed four people in Al-Matouna, a rural area of Suwayda, and was later arrested by Syrian government forces. The civilians were harvesting olives before they were shot and had received a security clearance from the government to enter their land.

On 10 February, the National Guard denied having closed the road between Umm al-Zaytoun and Damascus, declaring it as "misleading and false information" and that the crossing is controlled by Internal Security Forces in Suwayda.

On 16 February, the Syrian government forces intensified their drone attacks, which resulted in the death of one person and five injuries in the Mansoura-Walgha village area. A car exploded in Al-Qurayya, injuring two people, a Syrian source stated that the car was carrying weapons and ammunition.

On 17 February, the emir of Dar Ara, Abu Yahya Hassan Al-Atrash, defected to the Syrian government forces, arriving at Daraa Governorate from Suwayda, sources stated that Hikmat al-Hijri does not want other leaders in Suwayda, except him.

On 19 February, an unknown group kidnapped Yahya al-Hajjar, the former leader of Men of Dignity, on his farm in rural Suwayda, the Men of Dignity declared a state of maximum alert immediately after the kidnapping, when al-Hajjar was released, he was taken to the guesthouse of the Men of Dignity leader, Sheikh Mazid Khaddaj.

On 22 February, the Syrian government forces launched attacks toward Al-Majdal, the National Guard responded to the attacks.

On 24 February, an armed group from the village of Labin attacked the Internal Security Forces after an attempt to free one of its members who had been arrested for theft. At the Suwayda headquarters of the Criminal Security branch, the Rapid Intervention Battalion, led by Ruad Abdul Khaliq, clashed with a group from the Abu Sarhan family.

==== March ====
On 13 March, the Syrian government forces launched attacks toward Suwayda, Syrian government forces in Kharbat Samar attacked residents in the city of Ara.

On 19 March, clashes erupted between Syrian government forces and local defense units, including the Syrian National Guard, on multiple fronts around Suwayda, encompassing Tal Hadid and villages such as Walgha and Mansoura, and involving heavy and medium weaponry. A day later, Israeli airstrikes targeted several positions of Syrian government forces at Izraa in Daraa Governorate, including command and control centres, supply depots, and facilities held by the 40th Battalion of the Syrian Army, in retaliation to the escalation of hostilities.

On 25 March, a National Guard member was injured during clashes in the city of Era, in southern Suwayda.

==== April ====
On 7 April, Hikmat al-Hijri dissolved the Supreme Legal Committee in Suwayda, the judge Shadi Fayez Murshid was tasked with forming the Administrative Council of Jabal Bashan.

On 11 April, people went to the streets at al-Karama Square to show their support for Hikmat al-Hijri.

On 12 April 2026, clashes occurred between the Syrian Armed Forces and the National Guard along Maghdal–Mazraa. The next day, clashes took place between the Syrian Armed Forces and the National Guard along the Tel Hadid–industrial area.

On 13 April, clashes between the Syrian Armed Forces and the National Guard took place along the Tel Hadid–industrial area. Also an assassination attempt was made against Anad Makarem, after he threatened the National Guard with a "popular uprising", Makarem was left in critical condition.

On 15 April, the rival Druze leader Munir Najib al-Bahri was killed by unknown assailants.

On 27 April, it was reported that the car of commander Basel al-Shaer was targeted.

On 28 April, it was reported that the home of Rawad Abdul Khaleq, commander of the “Rapid Intervention” battalion in the National Guard, was attacked with gunfire and that the car of commander Farouk al-Naddaf was targeted with a Molotov cocktail.

==== May ====
On 2 May, the Jordanian Air Force led an operation called "Operation Jordanian Deterrence", in the cities of Shahba, Al-Kafr, Arman and Al-Anat, controlled by the Druze militias, to counter border drug trafficking, in the city of Shahba, the Jordanian Air Force bombed the former State Security branch. On the same day the Syrian government also operated against drug trafficker.

On 3 May, the National Guard published a statement where they condemned the Jordan's operation. The reason for the condemnation was the lack of coordination between Jordanian government and the National Guard.. On the same day a rebel armed group attacked Syrians positions, the attacks were similar to those of the National Guard.

On 4 May, the National Guard targeted security posts in Rimat Hazem and Walgha.

On 5 May, the National Guard's 501st Battalion (Hamza Knights) clashed with the Syrian Armed Forces.

On 6 May, retired Jordanian military analyst, Major General Abu Nowar, told Al Jazeera English that the airstrikes were a deterrent to drug cartels, as well as a warning to external actors—such as Israel and Israel-allied elements in Suwayda—seeking to capitalize on the power struggle.

On 9 May, two inner faction of the National Guard, the Saraya al-Jabal faction and the Jala Abu Daqqa faction, clashed with each other, the clashes began when Saraya al-Jabal arrested members of the Jala Abu Daqqa faction after they were accused of vehicle theft.

On 18 May, the National Guard indicated that "armed gangs" attacked a checkpoint on the northwestern axis, leaving several injuries among the checkpoint force.

==== June ====
On 6 June, the Brigadier general Jihad Ghoutani resigned after the escape of 3 detainees. Following the revelation of a mutiny within the National Guard, groups led by Yarob Zahreddine, son of the late former leader of the Syrian Republican Guard, Issam Zahreddine and Sakhr Malak took control of the National Guard headquarters, arresting Jihad Ghoutani and Ammar al-Shaarani. Chief of Staff Issam Abu Saeed was appointed leader of the National Guard to temporarily lead the command.

On 23 June, shepherds evaded government security checkpoints while tending their flocks; the National Guard ambushed them, killing one instantly. That night, three armed men, reportedly belonging to the Syrian General Security and Bedouin tribes, infiltrated the Al-Majdal region from the city of Al-Mazraa; the National Guard captured one of the infiltrators.

==== July ====
On 1 July, a National Guard member was shot dead by a Syrian government sniper, the National Guard declared it was an "explicit violation" of the ceasefire.

On 2 July, the Syrian government forces clashed with the National Guard after an intense bombardment by government forces in Tel Hadid, the clashes also took place in Umm al-Zaytoun and al-Matuna, in northern Suwayda.

On 7 July, the Syrian government forces bombarded the city of Al-Mazra'a with mortars, sparking clashes along the Al-Majdal and Al-Mazra'a axis.

On 13 July, one year after the events of July 2025, the residents of Jaramana held a meeting to commemorate the events; at the vigil, the head of the spiritual and religious authority of Jaramana, Haitham Katiba, declared Druze dignity and their right to defend themselves.

On 16 July, the events of the "Black July Week" continued, commemorating fallen Druze soldiers at the Shrine of the Martyrs in the city of Ar-Raha; in addition to the arrival of people at Al-Karama Square to participate in the popular events held to commemorate the first anniversary of the "Black July Week".

On 21 July, the National Guard carried out a forced eviction at the Al-Fursan residences, targeting Alawite families, while the Syrian Observatory for Human Rights claims it was a dispute between an Alawite resident and a Druze resident.

On 29 July, the Israeli far-right settler movement, Pioneers of Bashan, declared that its goal is "to create a humanitarian corridor from Israel to Suwayda", after several attempts to cross the territories occupied in the Israeli invasion.

==== August ====
On 3 August, the National Guard expropriated the homes of the Al-Qudsi family, causing the Men of Dignity intervene to recover a home, this caused tensions between the National Guard and Men of Dignity.

On 6 August, 3 people died following the detonation of an Improvised explosive device against a minibus in Jaramana. The Islamist militant group, Minbar Ansar al-Rasoul claimed responsibility for the attack following a statement from religious leaders and residents of Jaramana calling for national unity.

On 8 August, the Syrian government forces clashed with the National Guard in Tal Hadid, after a drone belonging to the Syrian government forces crashed into areas controlled by the National Guard.

On 11 August, an explosion killed two people in Al-Harisa, reports suggest the explosion was caused by a landmine or a drone.

On 12 August, the National Guard attempted to infiltrate the Al-Zaytoun and Rimat Hazem axis but were repelled by the Internal Security Forces.

On 13 August, the National Guard accused the Syrian Ministry of Defense of trying to send two car bombs towards Suwayda, the National Guard also reported the seizure of two cars which were loaded with explosives.

On 21 August, the young man, Redan Al-Qantar, was hit by a sniper's bullet from the Internal Security Forces in the western part of Suwayda. Al-Qantar was taken to a hospital where his condition is stable. On the same day, it was reported that the National Guard threatened students to prevent them from reaching the testing centers to take the extraordinary high school graduation exams.

On 23 August, groups of the National Guard affiliated with Suleiman al-Hijri, son of Hikmat al-Hijri, closed and blocked the Umm al-Zaytoun checkpoint, preventing students from taking their exams.

On 27 August, the Shahba Operations Room, affiliated with the National Guard, warned drivers and means of transport that they would not transport students and that if they violated the warning, they would be penalized.

On 28 August, in the villages of Sala and Rashida, a 30-year-old man died after a clash with the National Guard, after the National Guard tried to arrest him. That same day, clashes broke out between the National Guard after militias laid siege to Rami Ishti and Ghaith Qantar in Ariqa, then militias affiliated with Nawras Azzam, a leader of the National Guard's security office, broke the siege.

==== September ====
On 1 September, the National Guard attacked the Walgha, Al-Majdal and Al-Mazraa fronts with a drone, then the Internal Security Forces clashed with the National Guard, leaving 10 members of the Internal Security Forces injured, conversely, the National Guard claimed that the Internal Security Forces launched mortar rounds and fired machine guns.

On 4 September, groups considered as "outlaws" forced the expulsion of Atef Hneidi, known as "al-Basha", from the Suwayda governorate, this comes after Atef Hneidi issued a statement criticizing Hikmat al-Hijri.

On 6 September, clashes broke out between the National Guard and the Syrian government forces, in the villages of Rima Hazem and Al-Mansoura, involving the use of heavy machine guns.

On 10 September, Syrian state television reported that "criminal groups" blocked the al-Matouna checkpoint, meanwhile, a source in Suwayda claimed that Syrian internal security forces stationed in al-Matouna blocked the passage of tourists to Damascus without any explanation.

On 24 September, Syrian government forces opened fire with machine guns on the city of Suwayda, and the National Guard responded to the attacks.

==== October ====
On 2 October, the National Guard clashed with Internal Security Forces in al-Mazraa, leaving one member of the National Guard injured.

On 8 October, Syrian government forces deployed in Dama and Al-Bustan attacked the towns of Ariqa and Waqm with machine-gun fire, and the National Guard repelled an infiltration attempt towards Waqm.

On 24 October, groups affiliated with the National Guard blocked the Suwayda-Damascus highway at the Umm al-Zaytoun checkpoint.

On 29 October, lawyer Salman Radwan was kidnapped by a local group, which triggered reprisals by Radwan’s group against the Abu Sarhan family, leading to clashes in the city of Suwayda.

== Peace efforts ==
=== Ceasefire attempts ===
Syrian minister of defense Murhaf Abu Qasra announced a ceasefire effective from 15 July 2025 after an agreement with the Druze leaders in Suwayda. The Syrian Ministry of Interior warned against any damage to private or public property in Suwayda. According to the ceasefire agreement, it was not a complete withdrawal of the administration, and it would be able to continue to maintain police forces in the district, which would operate together with local Druze, but it was required, as stated, to withdraw the military forces it had sent there in the battles in recent days. A mechanism was also agreed upon to regulate the issue of possession of heavy weapons in the area. The agreement also stipulates the establishment of an investigative committee that will examine atrocities committed by militants and regime members against the Druze, according to reports.

Following the second ceasefire announced on 16 July 2025, Syrian president Ahmed al-Sharaa addressed the nation stating that the government's priority is to protect Druze citizens as Israel continues its assaults on Syria. He further said "we reject any attempt to drag you into hands of an external party. We are not among those who fear the war. We have spent our lives facing challenges and defending our people, but we have put the interests of the Syrians before chaos and destruction". He criticised Israel for its attacks on government and civilians and expressed gratitude for American, Arab, and Turkish mediators for de-escalating the conflict and said that "the Israeli entity resorted to a wide-scale targeting of civilian and government facilities", adding that it led to a "significant complication of the situation and pushed matters to a large-scale escalation".

On 16 July 2025, US Secretary of State Marco Rubio stated that the United States was making progress for a ceasefire agreement including Israel, saying "We hope to see some real progress to end what you've been seeing over the last couple of hours", as he addressed reporters at the Oval Office.

According to a Turkish security source, Turkish intelligence officers held talks with Syrian Druze leaders for securing the ceasefire. İbrahim Kalın, the director of the Turkish National Intelligence Organization, also held discussions with his Israeli, American and Syrian counterparts, as well as Ahmed al-Sharaa.

A joint "Gulf-Arab-Turkish" statement reaffirmed their support for Syrian integrity and "welcomed" al-Sharaa's commitment to hold to account fighters who took part in "abuses".

According to the spiritual leadership of the Druze in Syria, the agreement signed for a ceasefire from 19 July included a number of key steps intended to bring about calm and an end to the conflicts in the area. As part of the agreement, checkpoints of the General Security Forces will be deployed outside the administrative borders of the district, in order to prevent the infiltration of armed groups and stop the conflicts. Entry to villages on the border will be prohibited for 48 hours, to allow the deployment of forces and prevent surprise attacks. Bedouin tribesmen who remain within the district will be allowed to leave under secure escort and without interference, while humanitarian crossings will be opened in emergencies through Busra al-Harir and Busra al-Sham. The spiritual leadership called on all local groups not to leave the district's borders and to refrain from provocations, and made it clear that any party that violates the agreement will be held responsible for the collapse of the understandings. A call was also made to the residents of the governorate to act responsibly and in coordination in order to bring an end to the crisis that has affected them.

The newspaper Al-Modon reported on 14 August 2026, that negotiations are underway between the Syrian Transitional Government and Hikmat al-Hijri to reach an agreement similar to the one signed between the Syrian Transitional Government and the Syrian Democratic Forces on 10 March 2026. On 20 August, Arabi Post reported that progress has been made in communications between the Syrian government and the National Guard, with the aim of restoring the functioning of government institutions.

=== Prisoner exchange ===
Following the ceasefire on 18 July 2025, a prisoner exchange attempt on 20 July 2025 in the Umm al-Zaytoun town failed after a shelling from northern Suwayda, according to the Syrian Observatory for Human Rights.

== Civilian impact ==
=== Displacement ===
The UN reported that more than 93,000 Syrians have been displaced in Sweida, the Daraa governorate, and rural Damascus due to the violence, said UN spokesperson Stéphane Dujarric.

=== Abduction and disappearances ===
The Syrian Observatory for Human Rights reported that 560 people, including women and children, went missing during clashes in Suwayda. The UN reported that 105 Druze women and girls were abducted by groups affiliated with the Syrian government, with 80 of them still missing as of 21 August; in at least three cases, Druze women were raped before being murdered.

=== Human rights violations and war crimes ===
==== Documentaries ====
During the summer of 2025, the As-Suwayda Governorate in southern Syria witnessed heavy clashes between Druze factions and Bedouin militias. During this period, several videos emerged allegedly documenting summary executions, abuses against civilians, and acts of violence including the burning of houses, looting, and abductions.

- A video report by the BBC titled More than 350 people killed in Syria clashes showed widespread violence in affected areas.
- Drone footage showed damaged neighborhoods in Sweida following the fighting.
- CCTV footage from Sweida hospital circulated online, reportedly showing armed men killing a person inside the hospital while medical staff were forced to the ground.
- A video report from The Guardian titled Killed for what, religion? featured testimonies describing summary executions and retaliatory violence during the sectarian escalation.

Human Rights Watch reported that the conflict was accompanied by "serious abuses," including summary executions, arson attacks on homes, looting of property, and the forced displacement of civilians.

== Reactions ==
=== Domestic ===
- Syria: Syria condemned the Israeli strikes on Syria and asserted their right to self-defense. The foreign ministry said that Israel's "flagrant assault, which forms part of a deliberate policy pursued by the Israeli entity to inflame tensions, spread chaos, and undermine security and stability in Syria, constitutes a blatant violation of the United Nations Charter and international humanitarian law". The head of security in Suwayda, Suleiman Abdul Baqi, declared "that some of the Druze in Israel who misled Hikmat al-Hijri into believing he would be granted a "state" have no influence in Washington" and "the American administration supports President Ahmed al-Sharaa and a unified Syrian state, and is against any separatist project or separatist groups, and does not support any Syrian component except through sending humanitarian aid, and supports the security and stability of Syria".
- (Democratic Autonomous Administration of North and East Syria) Rojava/DAANES: The SDF condemned the violence in Suwayda, commenting on the civilian casualties in the conflict. The Kurdish women-led YPJ in particular expressed its readiness to "protect Druze women and civilians, [and to] shoulder all the responsibility placed upon us without hesitation". On 17 July 2025 the Social Affairs and Labor Authority of the DAANES dispatched humanitarian aid to Suwayda Governorate.
- Suwayda Military Council: An official statement was issued declaring a state of maximum alert. The council announced that all combat units under its command had been placed on maximum alert, prepared for immediate intervention if deemed necessary to protect civilians.
- Druze leaders: The Sheikh al-'Aql, Hikmat al-Hijri, called on Druze fighters to "resist this brutal campaign by all available means", the main sheikh of the Druze in Israel, Muwaffaq Tarif, declared, "The eyes and hearts of the Israeli Druze community are focused on the suffering of the Druze villages around Damascus", although he distanced himself from al-Hijri.
- Supreme Alawite Islamic Council: The Sheikh Ghazal Ghazal, the leader of the Supreme Alawite Islamic Council, pointed to the attacks against churches and members of the Druze community, emphasizing that "the perpetrator is the same, and the blood is the same". He stated that what the Alawite community has suffered has also affected other sects.
- Saraya Ansar al-Sunnah: The group threatened on 15 July to expand its sectarian attacks to include the Druze community in Suwayda.
- Islamic State: Abu Hudhayfa's group, affiliated with ISIS, declared that the Druze "violated the honor of Sunni Muslims," and that the goal of the attack was to kill the "infidel Druze".
- Minbar Ansar Al-Rasoul: The group celebrated the "victory" of the Internal Security Forces over the Druze protesters in Jaramana.

=== International ===
==== State actors ====
- Algeria: Algeria strongly condemned the Israeli attack on Syria, calling it a flagrant violation of sovereignty.
- Bahrain: Bahrain welcomed the Syrian government's announcement of a ceasefire in Suwayda province, saying the measure contributes to improving security, stability and preserving civil peace.
- China: China emphasized that Syria's sovereignty and territorial integrity must be respected.
- Egypt: Egypt condemned the repetitive attacks on Syria as a "violation" of the sovereignty of the country and a "breach of international law".
- France: France called for an end to "abuses targeting civilians" in Suwayda and a "immediate cessation of clashes".
- Germany: Germany threatened to suspend its support for the Syrian transitional government following the events in Suwayda.
- Iran: Iran expressed strong condemnation of the attacks by Israel on Syria and made concerns on the clashes in Suwayda.
- Iraq: Iraq expressed its deep concern over the escalating tensions in Syria and strongly condemned Israel's repeated military interventions, calling them flagrant violations of sovereignty.
- Japan: Japan calls for respecting Syria's sovereignty and territorial integrity.
- Lebanon: Lebanon condemns Israeli attacks on Syria and urges international community to assume its responsibilities, the Lebanese politician, Walid Jumblatt, warned against "the plots of Israel" and accused Netanyahu of attempting to create sectarian division and chaos in Syria.
- Russia: Russia condemned the Israeli strikes in Syria, calling it a violation of Syria's sovereignty.
- Saudi Arabia: Saudi Arabia expressed its strong support for the actions taken by the Syrian government in order to attain territorial integrity, called on the international community to stand with Syria and condemned the Israeli airstrikes.
- Turkey: Turkey expressed its support for the actions taken by Syria to assure its territorial integrity and condemned the Israeli intervention in the conflict.
- United Kingdom: A British envoy to Syria calls for de-escalation in the south of the country.
- Syrian Ministry of Foreign Affairs and Expatriates: stated that condemnations of Israeli attacks on Syria were also expressed by Afghanistan, Denmark, Greece, Norway, Pakistan, Panama, Sierra Leone, South Korea, Spain, and Switzerland.

==== Non-state actors ====
- United Nations: The UN urged de-escalation between the belligerents and urged measures to protect civilians.
- European Union: The EU urged de-escalation and the implementation of the ceasefire declared on 15 July. It expressed its concern over Syria's sovereignty and integrity.
- Arab League: The General Secretariat of the Arab League strongly condemned the Israeli airstrikes on Syria, describing them as a blatant violation of the sovereignty of a fellow Arab League and UN member state and a clear breach of international law. The League characterized the attacks as acts of "bullying" that must not be tolerated by the regional or international community and called for their immediate cessation. It warned that the strikes aimed to sow chaos in Syria by exploiting recent unrest in Suwayda—events which the Syrian government itself denounced and pledged to investigate. The League expressed full solidarity with Syria, urging the government to defuse tensions through dialogue and inclusive national reconciliation.
- Gulf Cooperation Council: The council condemned Israeli attacks on Syria.
- The Muslim World League issued a statement expressing its full solidarity with Syria against any threats to its security, stability, and sovereignty, particularly attempts to sow discord among its communities or interfere in its internal affairs. The League voiced support for the Syrian government's efforts to protect all segments of the population, uphold civil peace, and enforce the rule of law. It also condemned Israel's attacks on Syrian territory and its "continued violations of international laws and norms".
- Hamas: Hamas issued a statement expressing full solidarity with Syria and described the Israeli attacks as a "blatant violation of international laws" and called for a strong response to confront them.
- Hezbollah: Hezbollah condemned the Israeli strikes, describing them as against international law.

== See also ==
- SDF–Syrian transitional government clashes (2025–present)
- Turkish offensive into northeastern Syria (2024–2025)
- Israeli invasion of Syria (2024–present)
- Hezbollah–Syria clashes (2024–present)
- Western Syria clashes
