= 2025 Suwayda coup d'état attempt =

Attempted coup d'état in Syria

- Part of the Southern Syria conflict (2025–present) of the Aftermath of the Syrian civil war
Date	29 November 2025
Location	Suwayda, Suwayda Governorate, Syria
Result	Coup d'état attempt failed: Arrests and killings of coup plotters between 29 November 2025 and 1 December 2025

Belligerents
Ahrar Jabal al-Arab Gathering; Supported by: Syrian Arab Republic (Note: Alleged by the National Guard)	Supreme Legal Committee in Suwayda

Commanders and leaders
Gandhi Abo Fakhr (POW)	Hikmat al-Hijri

Units involved
Ahrar Jabal al-Arab Gathering	National Guard; Internal Security Forces

On 29 November 2025, Druze militias aligned with the Syrian transitional government attempted a coup d'état against the Supreme Legal Committee in Suwayda, led by Hikmat al-Hijri.

== Background ==
On 28 November 2025, one day before the coup d'état attempt, clashes broke out between the Syrian Armed Forces and the National Guard in Al-Majdal. On the same day people were already arrested, the National Guard claimed to have arrested "traitors and conspirators".

== Events ==
During the attempted coup d'état, Gandhi Abo Fakhr, a commander of the pro-government Druze militia Ahrar Jabal al-Arab attempted to storm several government buildings belonging to the Supreme Legal Committee in Suwayda, however was stopped by National Guard forces, whom then managed to arrest several participants of the attempted coup.

== Aftermath ==
After the failed attempt, the National Guard arrested the participating people behind the coup d'état attempt. All that were directly involved were arrested, including Raed al-Matni, Assem Abo Fakhr, Gandhi Abo Fakhr, Maher Falhout who surrendered after a raid on his home in the town of Atil, Hussam Zeidan, Zeidan Zeidan and Alameddine Zeidan.

After the coup d'état attempt, the National Guard issued a statement about the failed coup d'état attempt where they claimed that Suleiman Abdul Baqi and the Syrian government coordinated with the plotters. Two days later on 3 December 2025, Maher Falhout and Raed al-Matni were tortured to death under National Guard custody. On the same day, the National Guard raided Baqi's house on 29 November, at the time both his children and wife were present. Laith al-Balous leader of the pro-Syrian government Druze group the Dignity Guest House, reported that the National Guard burned homes.

== See also ==
- List of Syrian coups d'état
