= Supreme Legal Committee in Suwayda =

De facto local legal-administrative authority in Suwayda, Syria

Supreme Legal Committee in Suwayda اللجنة القانونية العليا في السويداء
- 2025–2026
- Flag

- Territory of the Committee as of 19 February 2026 which are controlled by the National Guard
- Status: Unrecognized legal-administrative authority
- Capital: Suwayda
- Government: Legal-administrative authority
- Leader
  - 2025–2026: Hikmat al-Hijri (Note: Spiritual leadership of the Druze in Syria is split into two since the 2010s, one is headed by Hikmat al-Hijri, the other is mutually headed by Hammoud al-Hinnawi and Youssef Jarbou.)
- Head of the Legal Committee
  - 2025–2026: Muhannad Abu Faour
- Secretary-General
  - 2025–2026: Maher Ghaleb al-Andari
- Establishment: Aftermath of the Syrian civil war
  - Established: 26 July 2025
  - Ayoub Kara declares independence: 21 September 2025
  - 2025 Suwayda coup d'état attempt: 29 November 2025
  - Replaced with the Administrative Council of Jabal Bashan: 7 April 2026
- Currency: Syrian pound (SYP)
- Time zone: UTC+3 (AST)
- Website; Media Office of the Supreme Legal Committee
Preceded by	Succeeded by
Syrian Arab Republic	Administrative Council of Jabal Bashan

The Supreme Legal Committee in Suwayda (Arabic: اللجنة القانونية العليا في السويداء) also Legal Committee in Bashan or also called Higher Legal Committee was a short-lived unilaterally declared de facto autonomous legal-administrative authority operating in the Suwayda Governorate in southern Syria. It was established on 26 July 2025, under the auspices of the Spiritual Leadership of the Unitarian Druze, led by Sheikh Hikmat al-Hijri, following clashes in the region and the partial withdrawal of central government institutions. The SLCS recognized the Syrian transitional government only as the de facto authority of Syria.

The Supreme Legal Committee was dissolved by al-Hijri and was replaced by the Administrative Council of Jabal Bashan on 7 April 2026.

== Formation ==
The committee was formed amid growing instability and a power vacuum in Suwayda. It consists of six judges, including four judicial advisors, and three lawyers. The formation was announced by the Spiritual Leadership of the Druze, headed by Sheikh Hikmat al-Hijri.

The committee also revealed the formation of a temporary executive office to oversee essential services in the governorate.

=== Mandate and functions ===
In a series of official statements, the Supreme Legal Committee outlined its responsibilities as managing public affairs across all sectors in Suwayda, including administrative, security, and service-related matters. Its stated goals include:

- Preserving public and private institutions.
- Combating corruption and addressing grievances from all communities.
- Forming a temporary executive office to manage local services.
- Creating specialized subcommittees focused on relief, documenting violations, and tracking the fate of missing and forcibly disappeared persons.
- Overseeing issues related to martyrs and the wounded.
- Accepting and distributing donations to those affected by the conflict.
- Monitoring the healthcare sector and ensuring the functioning of both public and private hospitals.

The committee justified its actions by citing "the urgent circumstances in Suwayda and the need to ensure prompt services to the population".

== Leadership appointments ==
On 6 August 2025, the committee announced the appointment of:

- Brigadier General Shakib Ajwad Nasr as Commander of the Internal Security Forces in Suwayda.
- Brigadier General Anwar Adul Radwan as Deputy Commander.

Nasr previously served as a senior official in the Political Security Directorate under the Ba'athist regime.

Several weeks later, Nasr left the office and was replaced by Shadi Fayez Murshid.

== Legal status ==
On 7 August 2025, The Syrian Ministry of Justice referred the judges involved in the committee to the Judicial Inspection Directorate for investigation. According to a government source cited by the government-owned Syrian Arab News Agency, the judges violated judicial conduct rules outlined in the Judicial Authority Law. The source stated that the judges in question undertook activities deemed incompatible with their judicial responsibilities; specifically, engaging in political work outside the authority of the Supreme Judicial Council. Articles 78 and beyond of the Judicial Authority Law prohibit judges from combining their duties with other jobs or political involvement, either directly or indirectly. The ministry said that the actions of these judges were political in nature, ran counter to national interests, and promoted division.

== Defence & security ==
The National Guard is a paramilitary force formed through the amalgamation of numerous Druze factions. Its purpose was to serve as a unified force to coordinate military and security efforts in Druze areas. The National Guard continued to fulfil this role for the succeeding Administrative Council of Jabal Bashan.

== Development ==
=== Important events ===
==== 2025 ====
===== August 2025 =====
On 3 August 2025, what the transitional government called "illegal groups" reportedly violated the ceasefire agreement and attacked the Syrian Internal Security Forces. Fighting took place in Tal al-Hadid, with the Al-Jabal Brigade involved in the fighting

On 8 August 2025, clashes erupted in the town of Najran between Druze factions and an armed group, following an attack reportedly launched by the latter. The Syrian Observatory for Human Rights reported that the clashes resulted in the deaths of two people on both sides, along with material damage and the burning of several civilian homes, before the attackers withdrew.

On 10 August 2025, the town of al-Majdal came under an assault from three directions, involving the use of heavy machine guns and mortar fire. One wave of the attack originated from the town of al-Mazraa, where government forces are stationed, while the other two approached from positions west of al-Majdal, firing heavy and medium machine guns toward the surrounding villages.

On 23 August 2025, the National Guard was formed, with the aim of consolidating military efforts to confront what it described as "Salafist-jihadist gangs", with large military groups such as Anti-Terrorism Force, Al-Jabal Brigade, Sheikh al-Karama Forces, the As-Suwayda Operations Room, Al-Fahd Forces, with small groups, (Note: Gathering of the Mountain's Sons, Mountain Youth Relief, Al-Ulya Forces, Local Forces, Mount Tod Forces, The Conquerors, Den of the Mountain Forces, Hamza Knights Forces, Southern Sun Forces, Dhiab Hamza Forces, Guardians of the Frontiers, Sultan Forces, Sword of Justice Forces, Al-Ghayara Relief, Al-Nashama Relief, Shield of al-Lajat Forces, Khayyal Group, Thunder Banner – Ta'ara, Shield of the, Mountain Forces – Zain al-Din, Banner Relief – Activated Mountain Tribes, Druze Protection Units, Al-Asail Forces, Unified Army) and the Jaysh al-Muwahhidin included.

On 25 August 2025, according to Enab Baladi, other groups that later joined include "Men of Dignity, (Note: The Men of Dignity Movement "initially declined to join the new military formation". Later however, they "issued a statement welcoming the announcement of local factions uniting under an "organized military body", describing it as a necessary step at a time when the Druze community is defending its existence "against covetous invaders".) the Unitarian Popular Resistance, Southern Shield Forces, Mountain Shield Forces, Lions of the Mountain Forces, Shield of Tawhid, Sahwat al-Khedr Shield, Mimas and Tal al-Lawz, Men of al-Lajat and Men of al-Kafr", while 164th Brigade joined on 24 August, and the Suwayda Military Council joined on 27 August.

===== September 2025 =====
On 2 September 2025 the Syrian Observatory for Human Rights reported that Firas Hamayel, a commander in the National Guard, was killed in an ambush in Suwayda.

===== October 2025 =====
On 9 October 2025, clashes broke out between the Syrian Armed Forces and the National Guard.

On 11 October 2025, a US delegation met with Hikmat al-Hijri and the National Guard, without the knowledge of Jihad Ghoutani, which created divisions in the National Guard. On the same day al-Hijri changed the name of Jabal al-Arab to "Jabal al-Bashan", a Hebrew term, which generated controversy in Suwayda, the matters were legally resolved by the National Guard.

On 20 October, the National Guard repelled an infiltration attempt by Syrian government forces with 23mm heavy machine guns towards the town of Majdal.

===== November 2025 =====
On 13 November 2025 and 14 November 2025, al-Majdal saw heavy fighting during the Southern Syria clashes when Druze National Guard forces repelled a major Syrian caretaker government assault involving drones and heavy weapons, with no confirmed change in control.

On 28 November 2025 clashes broke out again.

On 29 November 2025, the National Guard claimed a "coup d'état" by Raed al-Matni and Assem Abo Fakhr, where they were arrested together with people related to Syrian government forces, Sources indicated that the incident was an attempted assault on the government building and police headquarters, carried out by "Gandhi Abo Fakhr and a group affiliated with him, in coordination with Suleiman Abdul Baqi, with the aim of "overthrowing al-Sheikh al-Hijri".

===== December 2025 =====
On 1 December, the National Guard detained 10 people, including, Sheikh Raed al-Matni, Assem Abou Fakher, Ghandi Abou Fakher, Maher Falhout, Hussam Zeidan, Zeidan Zeidan and Alameddine Zeidan, clarifying that they carried out a “swift and precise” operation to arrest what it called “traitors and conspirators”.

On 3 December, Raed al-Matni's body was found with signs of torture, after being accused of having links with Suleiman Abdul Baqi. The National Guard also raided al-Baqi's house, and promised a strong response.

On 14 December, activist and poet Anwar Fawzat al-Shaer was killed.

On 19 December, the National Guard accused Tareq al-Shoufi of "collaborating with Sharaa, and [he] went into hiding", while al-Hijri was "accused of kidnapping and his son of dealings with regional drug-smuggling networks, including Hezbollah." As of January 2026, the dispute had effectively ended.

On 24 and 25 December 2025, the Jordanian Army published a statement on its official website that it had targeted a number of factories and plants.

==== 2026 ====
===== January 2026 =====
On 6 January, Muhannad Mazhar a member of the National abducted the journalist Marhaf al-Shaer.

Between the 17 January and the 18 January, fightings broke out between the Syrian Armed Forces and the National Guard.

===== February 2026 =====
On 2 February, the Syrian internal security forces arrested Nasser Faisal Al-Saadi, a member of the National Guard, Eagles of the Whirlwind and Hezbollah, in addition to being the "biggest drug dealer in the region".

On 6 February, the Syrian government forces advanced towards the towns of Atil and Salim, reaching Sweida. A Syrian security source reported attacks toward al-Mazra'a. The Syrian government forces launched attacks toward al-Majdal with rocket launchers, killing the civilian Rani Basel Naeem.

On 7 February, the National Guards regulated the broadcasting, circulation or publication of any videos, images or field news of a “military nature,” including the names of fighters, injuries or wounded, regardless of the “publishing entity,” according to the local outlet Suwayda 24.

On 10 February, the National Guard denied having closed the road between Umm al-Zaytoun and Damascus, declaring it as "misleading and false information" and that the crossing is controlled by Internal Security Forces in Suwayda.

On 17 February, the emir of Dar Ara, Abu Yahya Hassan Al-Atrash, defected to the Syrian government forces, arriving at Daraa Governorate from Suwayda, sources stated that Hikmat al-Hijri does not want other leaders in Suwayda, except him.

On 19 February, an unknown group kidnapped Yahya al-Hajjar, the former leader of Men of Dignity, on his farm in rural Suwayda, the Men of Dignity declared a state of maximum alert immediately after the kidnapping, when al-Hajjar was released, he was taken to the guesthouse of the Men of Dignity leader, Sheikh Mazid Khaddaj.

On 22 February, the Syrian government forces launched attacks toward Al-Majdal, the National Guard responded to the attacks.

On 24 February, an armed group from the village of Labin attacked the Internal Security Forces after an attempt to free one of its members who had been arrested for theft. At the Suwayda headquarters of the Criminal Security branch, the Rapid Intervention Battalion, led by Ruad Abdul Khaliq, clashed with a group from the Abu Sarhan family.

On 26 February 2026 a prisoner exchange in which 25 government soldiers were swapped for 61 Druze detainees was done.

===== March 2026 =====
On 7 March 2026, clashes broke out between the National Guards and the Syrian Armed Forces in the outskirts of the city of Suwayda and several residential neighborhoods.

On 13 March 2026, Syrian government forces launched attacks toward Suwayda, while Syrian government forces in Kharbat Samar attacked residents in the city of Ara.

On 19 March 2026, clashes erupted between Syrian government forces and local defense units, including the Syrian National Guard, on multiple fronts around Suwayda, encompassing Tal Hadid and villages such as Walgha and Mansoura, and involving heavy and medium weaponry. A day later, Israeli airstrikes targeted several positions of Syrian government forces at Izraa in Daraa Governorate, including command and control centres, supply depots, and facilities held by the 40th Battalion of the Syrian Army, in retaliation to the escalation of hostilities. The State of Israel responded with strikes on Syrian territory.

On 25 March 2026, a National Guard member got injured during clashes.

===== April 2026 =====
On April 5, protesters demanded the resignation of the Supreme Legal Committee in Suwayda.

One day before the replacement of the Supreme Committee on 6 April, an armed group stormed the Suwayda Education Directorate in the Syrian-controlled region of Suwayda, due to the replacement of Laila Jahjah with Safwan Ballan as director of education in Suwayda. Ballan consequently withdrew from the position, stating that he was complying with al-Hijri's decision and wanted to avoid further internal division.

== Dissolution ==
On 7 April, the Druze spiritual leader, Hikmat al-Hijri, dissolved the Supreme Legal Committee in Suwayda and replaced it with the Administrative Council of Jabal Bashan.

== See also ==
- Federalization of Syria
- National Guard (Suwayda)
- Suwayda Military Council
