= Decisive Battle Operations Room =

Operations room in Syria

- غرفة عمليات معركة الحسم
- Leader: Tariq Al-Maghoush
- Founded: 6 December 2024
- Dates active: 6 December 2024 – present
- Country: Syria
- Allegiance: Supreme Legal Committee in Suwayda
- Headquarters: Suwayda
- Active regions: Suwayda Governorate
- Wars: Syrian civil war; 2024 Syrian opposition offensives; Southern Syria offensive (2024); Aftermath of the Syrian civil war; Southern Syria conflict (2025–present)

The Decisive Battle Operations Room (Arabic: غرفة عمليات معركة الحسم) is a Syrian operations room based in Suwayda Governorate.

== History ==
=== Foundation ===
The group was founded on 6 December 2024, through a declaration urging Ba'athist regime forces in Suwayda to lay down their arms and withdraw, giving one hour to surrender and evacuate to prevent the Southern Syria offensive.

During training the group looted and seized the Air Force Intelligence Directorate base in the governorate and took control of all military units, barracks and checkpoints.

The group called the Suwayda Provisional Military Council, the predecessor of Suwayda Military Council, "illegitimate".

The operations room is linked to four groups: Shahid Wahid al-Balous Brigade, Suleiman Abdul Baqi's groups and two groups of Anti-Terrorism Force.

After clashes between the Syrian Armed Forces and Druze militias, the head of the operations room, Al-Maghoush, who identifies himself as a representative of Sheikh Hikmat al-Hijri, explained that the "Operations Room is working on joint coordination with both the American and Israeli sides", considering that Israel has a "significant role in repelling attacks on Suwayda", describing the relationship with it as "good", and confirming that they "request its protection". He opposed the entry of the transitional government's special investigation committee into the province and claimed that the "operations room" led the so-called "decisive battle" against the Assad regime and contributed to the "liberation of the province".

== Composition ==
- Saraya al-Jabal
- Shahid Wahid al-Balous Brigade (since 2025)
- Suleiman Abdul Baqi's groups (since 2025)
  - Ahrar Jabal al-Arab Gathering
- Two groups of Anti-Terrorism Force (since 2025)
- Al-Jabal Brigade (until 2025)
- Men of Dignity (until 2025)
- Sheikh al-Karama Forces (until 2025)
- Tajammu‘ Abna’ al-Jabal (Gathering of the Mountain's Sons, until 2025)
- Faz‘at Shabab al-Jabal (Mountain Youth Relief, until 2025)

== See also ==
- Southern Operations Room
- National Guard (Suwayda)
