= 2025 Jaramana clashes =

Clashes between Druze militias and Syrian government forces

- Part of the aftermath of the Syrian civil war and Druze insurgency in Southern Syria
Date	28 February – 2 March 2025 (2 days)
Location	Jaramana, Rif Dimashq, Syria
Result	Syrian government victory: Security forces deployed across Jaramana; Clashes restart in April

Belligerents
Syria	Druze armed groups

Commanders and leaders
(Syria) Ahmed al-Sharaa (Syria) Hussam al-Tahhan	Tareq al-Shoufi

Units involved
Syrian Armed Forces; Syrian Army; Ministry of Interior; General Security Services	Jaramana Shield Brigade; Suwayda Military Council; Men of Dignity; Sheikh al-Karama Forces

Casualties and losses
2 security officers killed and two wounded	
- ~9 civilians injured

On 28 February 2025, violent confrontations erupted between security forces affiliated with Syria's transitional government and local Druze gunmen in Jaramana, a Damascus suburb with significant Druze and Christian populations. These clashes resulted in one fatality among security forces and nine injuries among Jaramana residents. Afterwards, the government and local Druze leaders agreed to share security responsibilities in Suwayda.

== Background ==
The clashes occurred approximately three months after the fall of the Assad regime in December 2024. Following the change in leadership, Syrian President Ahmed al-Sharaa worked to establish security and governmental authority throughout the country. The Druze, who constitute approximately three percent of Syria's population, had largely maintained neutrality during the country's civil war that began in 2011. Druze communities exist in neighboring Lebanon, Israel, and the Israeli-occupied Golan Heights.

In February 2025, local sources in Syria's Quneitra Governorate reported to Saudi news network Al Arabiya alleging that that the IDF had extended "tempting offers" of employment opportunities to residents of southern Syria. According to these reports, the IDF proposed arrangements that would allow Syrian Druze to work in Israel during daytime hours and return to their homes in Syria each evening, similar to employment models previously implemented for Palestinian workers from Gaza prior to 7 October 2023.

== Timeline ==
On 28 February 2025, unidentified armed individuals fired upon a vehicle carrying Druze civilians traveling on a road leading to Damascus International Airport within Jaramana. Two elderly individuals suffered injuries in this attack, and were both hospitalized.

Tensions escalated further as a result of a fatal confrontation at a local checkpoint near Jaramana in Rif Dimashq Governorate. Jaramana is a densely populated suburb near Damascus primarily inhabited by members of the Druze and Christian communities. According to Colonel Hussam al-Tahhan, the local security chief quoted by Syria's official news agency SANA, the incident began when checkpoint personnel stopped Ministry of Defence staff who were entering Jaramana to visit relatives. After surrendering their weapons as required, the ministry personnel reportedly came under direct gunfire following a verbal disagreement, resulting in the death of one security force member and injuries to another.

In response to these incidents, the General Security Service initiated a comprehensive security operation throughout Jaramana beginning on 28 February. Security forces reinforced positions at city entry points and deployed substantial personnel numbers around Jaramana to pursue suspected individuals considered responsible for the violence. Reports indicated that security forces intended to storm into Jaramana.

The following day, on 1 March, clashes broke out between Syrian caretaker government forces and local Druze armed groups responsible for community protection in Jaramana, during the security operation launched by Syrian authorities on the suburb. Members of the Jaramana Shield brigade were involved in the clashes. During a violent altercation which erupted in Al-Seuof Square between two General Security Service members and local armed residents, one local gunman sustained serious injuries, requiring hospitalization, while authorities took the two security personnel into custody.

Following the confrontation at Al-Seuof Square, the injured local gunman was transported to Al-Mujtahed Hospital for medical treatment. According to the Syrian Observatory for Human Rights (SOHR), the attending physician contacted security forces requesting intervention due to intimidation from two individuals accompanying the wounded man. Upon arrival of security personnel at the medical facility, a verbal dispute ensued between them and the patient's companions. The situation escalated when one of the wounded man's escorts allegedly made blasphemous remarks. This prompted members of HTS present at the hospital to physically assault and subsequently detain the companions.

The violence on 1 March would result in one confirmed fatality amongst security forces and approximately nine wounded individuals. By 2 March, the violence had largely subsided as Syrian security forces were deployed across Jaramana.

=== Aftermath ===
Suwayda factions, including Men of Dignity, Guest House of Dignity and Ahrar Jabal al-Arab, reached a deal with the Ministry of Interior regarding the entrance of General Security Service into the governorate.

== Reactions ==
=== Domestic ===
In response to the attacks on 1 March in Jaramana, the Suwayda Military Council issued an official statement declaring a state of high alert. The council announced that all combat units under its command had been placed on high readiness status, prepared for immediate intervention if deemed necessary to protect civilians.

Several members of Jaramana's Druze community issued a public statement declaring they would "withdraw protection from all offenders and outlaws" within their community. They further committed to surrendering anyone proven responsible for the violence to "the relevant authorities to face justice".

Once the unrest settled, Druze spiritual leaders in Jaramana blamed the fighting on "an undisciplined mob that does not belong to our customs, nor to our known monotheistic traditions or customs" and strongly rejected threats of intervention by Israel. Druze leader Sheikh Hikmat al-Hijri stated in a meeting that "our project is Syrian" and that he opposes those who advocate for anything outside of the “national” project.

=== International ===
On 1 March 2025, Israeli Prime Minister Benjamin Netanyahu and Defense Minister Israel Katz jointly ordered the Israel Defense Forces (IDF) to prepare for potential military intervention to protect the Druze population in Jaramana. In an official statement, they warned: "We will not allow the terrorist regime of radical Islam in Syria to harm the Druze. If the regime harms the Druze, it will be harmed by us." The statement further emphasized Israel's commitment "to our Druze brothers in Israel to do everything to prevent harm to their Druze brothers in Syria," adding that they would "take all necessary steps to maintain their security." The statement also called for the "complete demilitarization" and the removal of new Syrian regime forces from southern Syria, including the Quneitra, Suwayda, and Daraa Governorates.

This directive followed an earlier Israeli warning from the previous weekend cautioning Syria's new government against entering areas south of Damascus. The 1 March statement implied that Israeli forces might extend operations further into Syrian territory after establishing positions in a buffer zone and on strategic Mount Hermon. Local Israeli sources reported that the IDF was preparing to either conduct direct military strikes against Syrian forces if the situation in Jaramana deteriorated, or use the threat of intervention as a deterrent to pressure Syrian forces to withdraw from the area.

Lebanese Druze leader Walid Jumblatt warned against "the plots of Israel" and accused Netanyahu of attempting to create sectarian division and chaos in Syria.

== See also ==
- Southern Syria clashes (April–May 2025)
- Hezbollah–Syria clashes (2024–present)
- Israeli invasion of Syria (2024–present)
