= Jaramana Shield Brigade =

Druze Jaramana militia

- لواء درع جرمانا
- Dates active: 2025–present
- Country: Syria
- Headquarters: Jaramana, Damascus
- Wars: Syrian conflict (2024–present); Southern Syria conflict (2025–present); 2025 Jaramana clashes; Southern Syria clashes (April–May 2025)

The Jaramana Shield Brigade (Arabic: لواء درع جرمانا) is a Druze militia based in Jaramana, a suburb of Damascus, Syria.

== Background ==
In the 2024 offensive in southern Syria, the Southern Operations Room had Druze components including Al-Jabal Brigade, Sheikh al-Karama Forces and Men of Dignity, that were aligned against the Assad regime.

== History ==
Unidentified armed individuals attacked a vehicle on 28 February 2025 that was carrying Druze civilians near Damascus International Airport within Jaramana, injuring two elderly passengers. The same day, a fatal confrontation occurred at a local checkpoint near Jaramana between security forces and Ministry of Defence staff, resulting in one security force member's death and another's injury.

The following day, clashes broke out between Syrian transitional government forces and local Druze armed groups, including the Jaramana Shield Brigade, during a security operation in Jaramana. These clashes led to at least one fatality and approximately nine injuries. There was a clash between Hay'at Tahrir al-Sham (HTS) and the Jaramana Shield Brigade in which one HTS member was killed.

An ultimatum on 2 March from the Syrian caretaker government made the Jaramana Local Action Committee and the Jaramana Shield Brigade surrender.

The group participated in clashes on 23 May 2025.
