= Minbar Ansar Al-Rasoul =

Militant organization in Syria

Minbar Ansar al-Rasoul
- منبر أنصار الرسول
- Dates active: 2025 — present
- Country: Syria
- Active regions: Jaramana, Rif Dimashq Governorate, Syria
- Ideology: Islamism; Anti-Druzism; Anti-Christian
- Wars: Aftermath of the Syrian civil war; Southern Syria conflict (2025–present); 2026 Jaramana attack

The Minbar Ansar al-Rasoul (Arabic: منبر أنصار الرسول, lit. 'Prophet's Supporters Platform') is a militant Sunni Islamist organization in Jaramana.

== History ==
=== Foundation ===
On July 13, 2025, the group published threatening messages to the Christian and Druze communities of Jaramana.

=== Activities ===
On July 15, 2025, the group celebrated the "victory" of the Internal Security Forces over the Druze protesters in Jaramana.

On August 2, 2026, the group claimed to have a "cyber arm" that collects information on citizens of Jaramana and threatened to attack Jaramana.

==== 2026 Jaramana attack ====
2026 Jaramana attack
- Part of Aftermath of the Syrian civil war
- Location: Al-Rawda Street, Jaramana, Syria
- Date: August 6, 2026
- Attack type: IED detonation
- Deaths: 3 civilians
- Injuries: 14 injured
- Victim: Druze civilians
- Perpetrator: Minbar Ansar al-Rasoul

On August 6, 3 people died following the detonation of an Improvised explosive device against a minibus in Jaramana, the explosion occurred during peak hour, leaving 14 people injured. Minbar Ansar al-Rasoul claimed responsibility for the attack following a statement from religious leaders and residents of Jaramana calling for national unity.

== Analysis ==
According to the Lebanese newspaper, An-Nahar, the group focuses solely on the tension between Sunnis and Druze in Jaramana, making no mention of the 2026 Iran War or a "transnational project".
