= Syrian Council of Tribes and Clans =

Militant organization in Syria

- مجلس القبائل والعشائر السورية
- Leaders: Abdul Aziz Salem Al-Musallat; Abdul-Moneim al-Nassif
- Spokesperson: Mudar Hammad Al-Asaad
- Founded: December 21, 2018
- Dates active: 2018 – present
- Country: Syria
- Allegiance: (Syria) National Coalition of Syrian Revolutionary and Opposition Forces (2020 — 2025)
- Headquarters: Azaz
- Active regions: Deir ez-Zor Governorate; Suwayda Governorate
- Ideology: Arab nationalism
- Wars: Syrian civil war; Syrian conflict (2024–present); Druze insurgency in Southern Syria; Southern Syria clashes (July 2025–present)
- Website: YouTube official channel

The Syrian Council of Tribes and Clans (Arabic: مجلس القبائل والعشائر السورية) is a militant organization in Syria. The group is led by Abdul Moneim al-Naseef.

== History ==
=== Foundation ===
The council was founded on December 21, 2018, as a tribal political group opposed to the Ba'athist Syria, by Abdul Aziz Salem Al-Musallat, composed of 150 Syrian clans and tribes, with the aim of uniting the tribes east of the Euphrates and liberate the areas controlled by the Democratic Autonomous Administration of North and East Syria.

=== Activities ===
On December 15, 2024, the group, led by Dr. Jihad Mar’i, met with Hikmat al-Hijri, the meeting addressed the coexistence between the components of Syrian society. In 2025 the group congratulated Ahmed al-Sharaa on his victory against the Ba'athist Syria.

During Southern Syria clashes the group fought against the Druze militias but declared their withdrawal from Suwayda Governorate.
