= Al-Dumayr Air Base =

Al-Dumayr Air Base مطار الضمير العسكري
- IATA: none; ICAO: OS61

Summary
- Airport type: Military
- Owner: (Syria) Syrian Armed Forces
- Operator: Syrian Air Force
- Location: Al-Dumayr, Rif Dimashq Governorate
- In use: Unknown–present
- Coordinates: 33°36′35″N 36°44′56″E

Map
- Location in Syria

Runways
Direction	Length		Surface
Direction	ft	m	Surface
00/00	10,335	3,150	Concrete
00/00	7,756	2,364	Grass

Al-Dumayr Air Base (Arabic: مطار الضمير العسكري) is a Syrian Air Force installation located 40 kilometers north-east of Damascus, Syria.

The airbase was used extensively by the Syrian Arab Air Forces and Iranian Armed Forces during the Syrian Civil War.

== History ==
The base was used to support the army campaign on Eastern Ghouta. On 22 February 2018, Jaysh al-Islam bombed the airbase in an effort to weaken Syrian attacks on the rebel held enclave.

On 21 June 2022, four Syrian soldiers were killed near the airbase following an ambush by Islamic State fighters.

During the fall of Damascus, Burkan al-Furat seized the base from the Ba'athist regime.

== See also ==
- List of Syrian Air Force bases
