= Ad-Dara =

Ad-Dara الدارة
- Village
- Location within Syria
- Coordinates: 32°43′13″N 36°24′11″E
- Grid position: 281/236 PAL
- Country: Syria
- Governorate: Suwayda
- District: Suwayda
- Subdistrict: Suwayda

Population (2004 census)
  - Total: 1,243
- Time zone: UTC+2 (EET)
  - Summer (DST): UTC+3 (EEST)

Ad-Dara (Arabic: الدارة) is a village in southern Syria, administratively part of the Suwayda District of the Suwayda Governorate. According to the Syria Central Bureau of Statistics (CBS), Ad-Dara had a population of 1,243 in the 2004 census. Its inhabitants are predominantly Sunni Muslim Bedouins and Christians.

== Demographics ==
According to statistics from 1927, ad-Dara had a population consisting of a Christian majority of 293 inhabitants and a Sunni Muslim minority of 34.

== History ==
In 1596 the village appeared under the name of ad-Dar in the Ottoman tax registers as part of the nahiya (subdistrict) of Bani Nasiyya in the qadaa of Hauran. It had a population of 14 households and 8 bachelors, all Muslim, in all 22 taxable units. The villagers paid a fixed tax-rate of 40% on agricultural products, including wheat (3000 a.), barley (900 a.), summer crops (800 a), goats and beehives (150 a.), in addition to occasional revenues (150 a.); the taxes totalled 5,000 akçe.

== Religious buildings ==
- St. George Greek Orthodox Church
- Omar ibn al-Khattab Mosque

== See also ==
- Christians in Syria

== Bibliography ==
- Hütteroth, W.-D.; Abdulfattah, K. (1977). Historical Geography of Palestine, Transjordan and Southern Syria in the Late 16th Century. Erlanger Geographische Arbeiten, Sonderband 5. Erlangen, Germany: Vorstand der Fränkischen Geographischen Gesellschaft. ISBN 3-920405-41-2.
