= Abdul-Moneim al-Nassif =

Syrian politician

- عبد المنعم الناصيف

Member of the People's Assembly
- Incumbent
- Assumed office 1 July 2026
- Appointed by: Ahmed al-Sharaa

Personal details
- Party: Independent

Abdul-Moneim al-Nassif (Arabic: عبد المنعم الناصيف) is a Tribal figure and Syrian politician who has served as a member of the People's Assembly since July 2026.

== Biography ==
He was born in the town of Al-Wasita in the southern countryside of Aleppo in 1975. He holds a master's degree in engineering. He is considered one of the sheikhs of the Al-Mashhadani tribe. After the Syrian revolution, he headed the Syrian Council of Tribes and Clans since its formation in June 2018. When formed, it was called the "Shura Council of Syrian Tribes and Tribes", and it was formed at the invitation of the Syrian Salvation Government.

He led the tribal mobilisation against the predominantly Druze region of Suwayda, which would lead to the Southern Syria clashes.

Following the release of the Syrian presidential list, he became a member of the People's Assembly.
