= Ahrar Jabal al-Arab Gathering =

Militant organization in Syria

- Founder: Suleiman Abdul Baqi
- Leader: Suleiman Abdul Baqi
- Dates active: February 2022 — present
- Country: Syria
- Allegiance: Decisive Battle Operations Room
- Headquarters: Suwayda
- Active regions: Suwayda Governorate
- Ideology: Syrian opposition Anti-Assadism
- Status: Active
- Wars: Syrian civil war; Southern Syria protests (2023–24); Aftermath of the Syrian civil war; Druze insurgency in Southern Syria (2025–present); Southern Syria clashes (July 2025–present); 2025 Suwayda coup d'état attempt

Ahrar Jabal al-Arab Gathering (Arabic: تجمع أحرار جبل العرب, lit. 'Free Men of Jabal al-Arab') is a pro-government rebel group in Syria, based in Suwayda Governorate, located in southeastern Syria.

== History ==
The group, led by Suleiman Abdul Baqi, announced that it was 'ready to fight' against the Ba'athist-led regime in 2022.

Ahrar Jabal al-Arab pressured the regime to release prisoners from Suwayda amidst protests in 2023 and 2024. The group fights against drug trafficking.

Abdul Baqi coordinated the entry of government forces into the governorate in December 2024, following the fall of the Assad regime, though the convoy was forced to turn around, as it was not coordinated with the Suwayda-based Joint Operations Room.

A meeting was held in March 2025 between Druze spiritual leader Hikmat al-Hijri, Yahya Al-Hajjar, the head of the Men of Dignity, Abdul Baqi and Shakib Azam, the leader of Al-Jabal Brigade, in which it was agreed that the General Security Service would be "re-activated" in the governorate, as long as the people involved were from Suwayda. The Guest House of Dignity also announced its support for the initiative.

Ahrar Jabal al-Arab reiterated its support for the Syrian transitional government in July 2025, following the clashes in Suwayda that began in July 2025.
