= Tareq al-Shoufi =

Founder of Suwayda Military Council

- طارق الشوفي
- Born: 1968 (age 57–58); Suwayda Governorate
- Military career
- Allegiance: Syrian Arab Armed Forces (1997-2015); Suwayda Military Council (2024-2025)
- Branch: Syrian Arab Armed Forces (1997-2015)
- Known for: Being the founder of Suwayda Military Council
- Conflicts: Syrian civil war; Druze insurgency in Southern Syria (2025–present); Southern Syria clashes (April–May 2025); Southern Syria clashes (July 2025–present)

Tareq al-Shoufi (born in Suwayda Governorate) is the founder of the Suwayda Military Council, which participated in Druze revolts in Suwayda.

== Life ==
He was born in Suwayda Governorate specifically in Shannireh, on the outskirts of Suwayda. He enlisted in the Syrian Arab Armed Forces in 1997 and served until 2015, when he retired after clashes with the rebels.

== After the fall of Assad ==
He founded the Suwayda Military Council and emphasized that the group sought to unify with the Syrian Army and highlighted decentralization as a key principle, was rejected by Hikmat al-Hijri, who called them separatists. After this, al-Shoufi declared that the group is under al-Hijri's spiritual leadership.

During Southern Syria clashes in April al-Shoufi recruited people to fight against the Syrian Transitional Government.

Al-Shoufi participated in the Southern Syria clashes in July against Bedouin tribes and the Syrian Transitional Government.

At some point after the formation of the National Guard under al-Hijri's leadership, al-Shoufi was forced into hiding, having being accused by the of collaborating with the Syrian Transitional Government (STG) in defiance of al-Hijri's anti-STG stance.
