= Rimat Hazem =

Rimat Hazem ريمة حازم Rimet Hazem
- Village
- Location within Syria
- Coordinates: 32°45′31″N 36°32′04″E
- PAL: 294/241
- Country: Syria
- Governorate: Suwayda
- District: Suwayda
- Subdistrict: Suwayda

Population (2004 census)
  - Total: 1,627
- Time zone: UTC+2 (EET)
  - Summer (DST): UTC+3 (EEST)

Rimat Hazem (Arabic: ريمة حازم) is a village in southern Syria, administratively part of the Suwayda District of the Suwayda Governorate. According to the Syria Central Bureau of Statistics (CBS), Rimat Hazem had a population of 1,627 in the 2004 census. Its inhabitants are predominantly Druze, with a Sunni Muslim Bedouin minority.

== History ==
In 1596 the village appeared in the Ottoman tax registers named Rimat Hazim, part of the nahiya (Subdistrict) of Bani Sarma in the Hauran Sanjak. It had a Muslim population consisting of 19 households and 8 bachelors; a total of 27 taxable units. They paid a fixed tax-rate of 40% on agricultural products, including wheat (2250 a.), barley (900 a.), summer crops (650 a.), goats and beehives (100 a.); a total of 4,000 akçe.

== See also ==
- Druze in Syria

== Bibliography ==
- Hütteroth, W.-D.; Abdulfattah, K. (1977). Historical Geography of Palestine, Transjordan and Southern Syria in the Late 16th Century. Erlanger Geographische Arbeiten, Sonderband 5. Erlangen, Germany: Vorstand der Fränkischen Geographischen Gesellschaft. ISBN 3-920405-41-2.
