= Walgha =

Walgha ولغا
- Village
- Location within Syria
- Coordinates: 32°44′50″N 36°31′30″E
- Grid position: 293/239
- Country: Syria
- Governorate: Suwayda
- District: Suwayda
- Subdistrict: Suwayda

Population (2004 census)
  - Total: 1,482
- Time zone: UTC+2 (EET)
  - Summer (DST): UTC+3 (EEST)

Walgha (Arabic: ولغا) is a village in southern Syria, administratively part of the Suwayda District of the Suwayda Governorate. According to the 2004 census, it had a population of 1,482. Its inhabitants are predominantly Druze, with a Sunni Muslim Bedouin minority. Most of the Bedouins reside in the eastern part of the village, an area known as Al-Mansourah.

== Religious buildings ==
- Sa'd ibn Abi Waqqas Mosque
- Mosque

== See also ==
- Druze in Syria
