= Kanaker, Suwayda =

Kanaker كناكر
- Village
- Location within Syria
- Coordinates: 32°39′58″N 36°30′33″E
- Grid position: 291/230
- Country: Syria
- Governorate: Suwayda
- District: Suwayda
- Subdistrict: Suwayda

Population (2004 census)
  - Total: 426
- Time zone: UTC+2 (EET)
  - Summer (DST): UTC+3 (EEST)

Kanaker (Arabic: كناكر) is a village in southern Syria, administratively part of the Suwayda District of the Suwayda Governorate. According to the Syria Central Bureau of Statistics (CBS), Kanaker had a population of 426 in the 2004 census. Its inhabitants are predominantly Druze.

== See also ==
- Druze in Syria
