= Burkan al-Furat =

Militant organization in Deir ez-Zor and Khmeimim

- بركان الفرات
- Other name: Burkan al-Furat Brigades and Saraya Burkan al-Furat
- Leader: Mohammed al-Shami
- Founded: 8 September 2023
- Country: Syria
- Active regions: Deir ez-Zor Governorate; Latakia Governorate; Damascus Governorate
- Part of: (Syrian opposition) Free Syrian Army
- Wars: Syrian civil war; 2024 Syrian opposition offensive; Deir ez-Zor offensive (2024); Fall of Damascus (2024) (Note: Occupation of al-Dumayr Air Base); Druze insurgency in Southern Syria (2025–present)

Burkan al-Furat (Arabic: بركان الفرات, lit. 'Euphrates Volcano') is a militant organization in Syria that operates in Deir ez-Zor Governorate, Damascus Governorate and Latakia Governorate.

== History ==
On 20 November 2024, Burkan al-Furat carried out their very first attack against the Russian intervention and Iranian intervention in Syria and against the Syrian Democratic Forces, during which they killed Abu Fatima al-Iraqi, a commander of the Iranian Revolutionary Guard together with Jaafar al-Tayyar Brigades.

In the Opposition offensives they attacked and occupied Al-Asharah and Dumayr Air Base before they are occupied by Hayat Tahrir al-Sham.

On 6 May 2025, videos were released showing the group bombing the city of Suwayda and the "al-Hijri militias" from Daraa Governorate, according to activist Samer Salloum, it was the Syrian transitional government that allowed entry into the south.

On 20 May 2025, they attacked Khmeimim Air Base and their leader Mohammed al-Shami declared a month for the Russian forces to leave. Two fighters were killed in the attack, an Egyptian leader of the "Red Bands" brigade of Hayat Tahrir al-Sham and a Syrian.

On 25 May 2025, the group threatened Syrian actor Bassem Yakhour giving him 48 hours to leave Syria for supporting the Ba'athist regime.
