= Al-Majdal, Suwayda =

Al-Majdal المجدل
- Village
- Location within Syria
- Coordinates: 32°47′46″N 36°30′15″E
- Grid position: 291/245
- Country: Syria
- Governorate: Suwayda
- District: Suwayda
- Subdistrict: Mazraa

Population (2004 census)
  - Total: 3,459
- Time zone: UTC+2 (EET)
  - Summer (DST): UTC+3 (EEST)

Al-Majdal (Arabic: المجدل) is a village in southern Syria, administratively part of the Suwayda Governorate. According to the Syria Central Bureau of Statistics (CBS), Al-Majdal had a population of 3,459 in the 2004 census. Its inhabitants are predominantly Druze, with a Christian minority. It is one of the villages located in the Jabal al-Druze region.

== History ==
In 1596, the village appeared under the name of " Mujaydil " in the Ottoman tax registers as part of the nahiya (subdistrict) of Bani Nasiyya in the qadaa of Hauran. It had a mixed population, consisting of 3 households and 2 batchelors who were Muslim, in addition to 14 households and 7 bachelors who were Christians, in all 26 taxable units. The villagers paid a fixed tax-rate of 25% on agricultural products, including wheat (1200 a.), barley (450 a.), summer crops (350 a), goats and beehives (150 a.), in addition to occasional revenues (150 a.); the taxes totalled 2,300 akçe. All of the revenue went to a waqf.

In November 2025, al-Majdal saw heavy fighting during the Southern Syria clashes when Druze National Guard forces repelled a major Syrian caretaker government assault involving drones and heavy weapons, with no confirmed change in control.

== Demographics ==
In 2011, the Melkite Greek Catholic Church had approximately 170 believers.

== Religious buildings ==
- Entry of the Virgin into the Temple Melkite Greek Catholic Church
- St. John the Baptist Melkite Greek Catholic Church
- Maqam Dawud (David) (Druze Shrine)

== See also ==
- Druze in Syria
- Christians in Syria

== Bibliography ==
- Hütteroth, W.-D.; Abdulfattah, K. (1977). Historical Geography of Palestine, Transjordan and Southern Syria in the Late 16th Century. Erlanger Geographische Arbeiten, Sonderband 5. Erlangen, Germany: Vorstand der Fränkischen Geographischen Gesellschaft. ISBN 3-920405-41-2.
