= Suwayda Military Council =

Syrian Druze military coalition founded in 2025

- المجلس العسكري في السويداء
- Leader: Tareq al-Shoufi
- Founded: December 2024
- Dates active: December 2024 – December 2025
- Dissolved: December 2025
- Country: Syria
- Headquarters: Al Kafr Agricultural Airport, Suwayda
- Active regions: As-Suwayda Governorate, Jabal al-Druze, Southern Syria
- Ideology: Druze minority interests; Democracy; Secularism; Decentralization; Regionalism; Minority rights; Anti-Islamism
- Status: Merged into National Guard
- Wars: Syrian conflict (2024–present); Druze insurgency in Southern Syria (2025–present); 2025 Jaramana clashes; Southern Syria clashes (April–May 2025) (alleged by state media); Southern Syria clashes (July 2025–present)

The Suwayda Military Council, or Sweida Military Council (SMC), was an armed coalition established in December 2024 in the Druze-majority Suwayda Governorate in southern Syria.

Originally formed as the Interim Military Council following the fall of Bashar al-Assad's regime in December 2024, the organization emerged in response to growing security concerns after the withdrawal of the Syrian Arab Army (SAA) from the region. The group's stated objectives included the advancement of secularism, democracy, and decentralization, protection of civilians and public property from lawlessness, conflict, and to prevent forces under the Syrian Army of Ahmed al-Sharaa from entering Druze settlements and causing harm. The organisation was also alleged to be an Israeli proxy.

Despite initially using symbols similar to the Syrian Democratic Forces, it is not related. The council joined the National Guard in December 2025.

== History ==
Following the fall of the Assad regime, an informal coalition of militia forces in Suwayda, styling themselves the Interim Military Council, was formed on 11 December 2024. It began compiling a comprehensive database of former Syrian Arab Army officers, non-commissioned officers, and personnel from the internal security forces of the Assad regime with the goal of advocating for their rights and salaries.

The Suwayda Military Council was formally announced in February 2025, led by a group of defected officers, revolutionaries, and retired military personnel in the region. The council presented what it described as a "national project" to coordinate military efforts in the region, and was endorsed by Sheikh al-Aql of Syria's Druze community, and supported by two prominent Ahrar al-Sham faction leaders. As part of its initiatives, the council announced plans to conduct regular meetings to assess potential threats and develop appropriate responses.

Tareq al-Shoufi, a former lieutenant colonel in the Syrian Arab Army who defected in 2015, was chosen as the council's principal leader. Prior to taking up the role, he was a representative of an organization advocating for army officers who resigned and defected during the Syrian revolution.

Shortly after its founding, on 25 February, several local armed groups pledged allegiance to the council, including Nabi Shuaib Forces, Commander of the Faithful Ali bin Abi Talib Forces, and Bayraq Suleiman Bin Daoud Forces. They were later joined by Sheikh of the South Forces on 26 February, Habran Youth Gathering on 27 February, Umrah Youth on 3 March, and Al-Hasm Forces Gathering on 8 March. The council was also joined by various men from villages in the region.

The council was also reported to operate in coordination with a Druze spiritual leader, Hikmat al-Hijri.

The military council activated a dedicated border guard brigade as well as several security headquarters in Suwayda on 27 April, following what it claimed were "terrorist mobilizations" and cases of "security instability".

During May 2025 clashes in Southern Syria, an ambush in the village of al-Dour that resulted in two deaths and four injuries of members of the General Security Service of the Syrian transitional government who were transporting injured residents to seek medical treatment. The attack was attributed to the military council by Syrian state media. The council denied responsibility, alleging that the report was part of a media smear campaign.

The council participated in the July 2025 clashes in Southern Syria, and were accused by the Syrian government of massacring the local civilian Bedouin population.

On 26 August, the council announced its readiness to join the National Guard, a coalition of Druze militias. However, Military Council leader Tareq al-Shoufi later went into hiding from the National Guard after being accused of collaborating with the Syrian transitional government.

== Objectives ==
The council outlined several primary objectives, which included the protection of civilians and public property from violence and destruction, and the advancement of secularism, democracy, and the creation of a new decentralized Syrian state. The council aims to establish national army that is distinct from the structure and reputation of the current Syrian army, free from foreign influence, and inclusive of all ethnic and national groups in Syria. Al-Shoufi has emphasized the council's support for integration into a newly unified Syrian army while maintaining localized autonomy. The council also aims to cooperate with other security factions in the region to confront any potential security threats, and vowed to prevent government forces from entering Druze settlements in Jabal al-Druze and Suwayda.

The Suwayda Military Council has taken a firm stance against what it characterizes as criminal practices perpetrated by forces under the authority of al-Sharaa, which it referred to as Hay'at Tahrir al-Sham (HTS), across Syria. The council accused the Syrian government of conducting ethnic cleansing operations through forced civilian displacement, destruction of residences, and extrajudicial executions. The council characterized HTS's "methodology of repression and intimidation" as akin to the Assad regime's persecutory and authoritarian tactics. The council has explicitly declared that "there is no place for the HTS militias in the future of Syria," asserting that Syrian citizens who participated in the revolution against injustice must reject any subsequent tyrannical governance, regardless of whether it characterizes itself as revolutionary or authoritarian.

=== Relations with Syrian Democratic Forces ===
The SMC initially bore a distinct logo, though several months later it adopted a flag featuring a map of Syria identical to that used by the Kurdish-led Syrian Democratic Forces (SDF), modifying it to highlight the Suwayda Governorate while incorporating the Druze five-pointed star. The council has expressed openness to cooperation with the SDF, characterizing it as a force that defended its territory and population against both terrorism and dictatorships.

=== Relations with Israel ===
On 24 February 2025, Israeli Prime Minister Benjamin Netanyahu announced that Israel would not allow Syria's new army, including any HTS forces, to enter the area south of Damascus. Netanyahu demanded the demilitarization of southern Syria provinces of Quneitra, Daraa and Suwayda from forces of the Syrian transitional government, and emphasized that Israel would not tolerate any threats to the Druze community in southern Syria.

Al-Shoufi thanked everyone who supported the position of the Military Council and contributed to protecting the Druze community and stability of the region. Majed Najem Abu Ras, who leads the Bayraq Suleiman Daoud Forces that have pledged allegiance to the Suwayda Military Council, has previously shared content expressing support for Israel. At the same time, Al-Shoufi has stressed that the new Syrian army must be free from foreign influence.

A December 2025 report from The Washington Post, citing current and former Israeli officials, alleged that the Military Council was formed at the behest of Israeli intelligence services. The report further claimed that the Military Council was armed via airdrops alongside humanitarian supplies, and that funds were channeled through the SDF. According to the report, Israeli weapons transfers since mid-2025 began going to the National Guard rather than the Military Council.

== See also ==
- Military Council for the Liberation of Syria – Council of Assad loyalists primarily in Western Syria
- Syrian Popular Resistance – A neo-Ba'athist insurgent group in Alawite-majority regions also against the Syrian transitional government
- Syrian Democratic Forces – Kurdish-led group in Northeastern Syria fighting against Turkey.
