= Suleiman Abdul Baqi =

Syrian militant leader and politician

Head of Security File in Suwayda
- In office 14 September 2025 – 6 April 2026
- Preceded by: Office established
- Succeeded by: Samer Shafiq Azi

Leader of Ahrar Jabal al-Arab
- Incumbent
- Assumed office February 2022

Personal details
- Born: 1985 (age 40–41)
- Other political affiliations: Ahrar Jabal al-Arab

Suleiman Abdul Baqi is a Syrian politician who served as the head of security in Suwayda from September 2025 to April 2026, alongside serving as the leader of Ahrar Jabal al-Arab, a pro-government Druze militia.

== Early life and career ==
He was born around 1985. During the Syrian civil war, Abdul Baqi was targeted in several assassination attempts; one took place in September 2021. He and two others were also targeted near Suwayda National Hospital on 11 November 2024, which resulted in injuries to all three. Several months later in March 2025, his home in Suwayda was targeted by rocket launchers.

He was appointed as the head of security file in Suwayda on 14 September 2025. His home was raided on 29 November by members of the National Guard. On 6 April 2026, he was succeeded by Samer Shafiq Azi as head of security file in Suwayda.
