= Al-Jabal Brigade =

Druze militia based in al-Suwayda Governorate

- لواء الجبل
- Emblem of the group
- Other name: Liwa al-Jabal
- Leaders: Marhaj al-Jarmani (2014–2024); Shakib Azzam (2024–2025)
- Dates active: 2014–August 2025
- Dissolved: 23 August 2025
- Merged into: National Guard
- Country: Syria
- Allegiance: Syrian opposition
- Headquarters: As-Suwayda
- Active regions: As-Suwayda Governorate
- Status: Dissolved
- Part of: (Syrian opposition) Southern Operations Room (Syria) Decisive Battle Operations Room
- Wars: Syrian civil war; 2018 Southern Syria offensive; 2018 As-Suwayda attacks; 2024 Syrian opposition offensives; Southern Syria offensive (2024); Syrian conflict (2024–present); Druze insurgency in Southern Syria (2025–present); Southern Syria clashes (July 2025–present)

The Al-Jabal Brigade (Arabic: لواء الجبل, romanized: Liwā' al-Jabal, lit. 'The Mountain Brigade', Arabic pronunciation: [liˈwɑːʔ alˈdʒabal]) is a Druze militia that operated primarily in the al-Suwayda Governorate of southern Syria. Established during the Syrian civil war, the group has been involved in various military operations. In August 2025, the group reportedly merged into the Druze-led National Guard, though a year later, amid reported disagreements between the brigade's members and the National Guard leadership, accounts differed on whether it was still part of the Guard or not.

== Background ==
The Al-Jabal Brigade emerged amidst the fragmentation of the Syrian conflict. Its formation reflected localized efforts by Assad loyalists to assert control and protect communities in the predominantly Druze region of al-Suwayda and was aimed at community defense.

== Activities ==
The group has conducted military operations against opposition forces, including rocket attacks on regime headquarters.

The faction allied with Druze militia Men of Dignity and the armed wing of the Syrian Socialist Nationalist Party, Eagles of the Whirlwind, in July 2018 while fighting against the Islamic State.

The faction joined the Southern Operations Room in late 2024 and took part in the 2024 Southern Syria offensive.

The group issued a joint statement with the Men of Dignity in January 2025 emphasizing that it was prepared to integrate into a new "military body" following the collapse of the Assad regime the previous month.

The office of Suwayda governor Mustafa al-Bakour was stormed on 21 May by armed criminals who successfully released Raghib Qarqout, a convicted car thief. The Men of Dignity provided cover for al-Bakour's exit, while the Al-Jabal Brigade engaged with the criminals.

The faction aligned itself with other anti-government Druze groups during the Southern Syria clashes (July 2025–present).

In August 2025, the group reportedly merged into the Druze-led National Guard. A year later, one analysis report described the brigade as outside of and opposed to the National Guard's command structure, while another source said it was still "nominally" part of the National Guard, though its members were largely opposed to the actions of factions close to the Guard's leadership.

== Composition ==
The brigade is made up five groups as of January 2017, including "Katibat Jalamid Urman", "al-Zaghaba", "Ammar bin Yasir", "al-Suqur" and "al-Basha."

== Leadership ==
Marhaj al-Jarmani, a prominent leader of the brigade, was assassinated on 19 July 2024 at his home in al-Suwayda. It was thought by some that his death was caused by the Syrian government, but an investigation by the group indicated that his wife and daughter were responsible.

== Relations with other factions ==
While initially aligned with local defense militias, the group has also cooperated with pro-regime forces.
