= Jaramana =

Jaramana جرمانا
- City
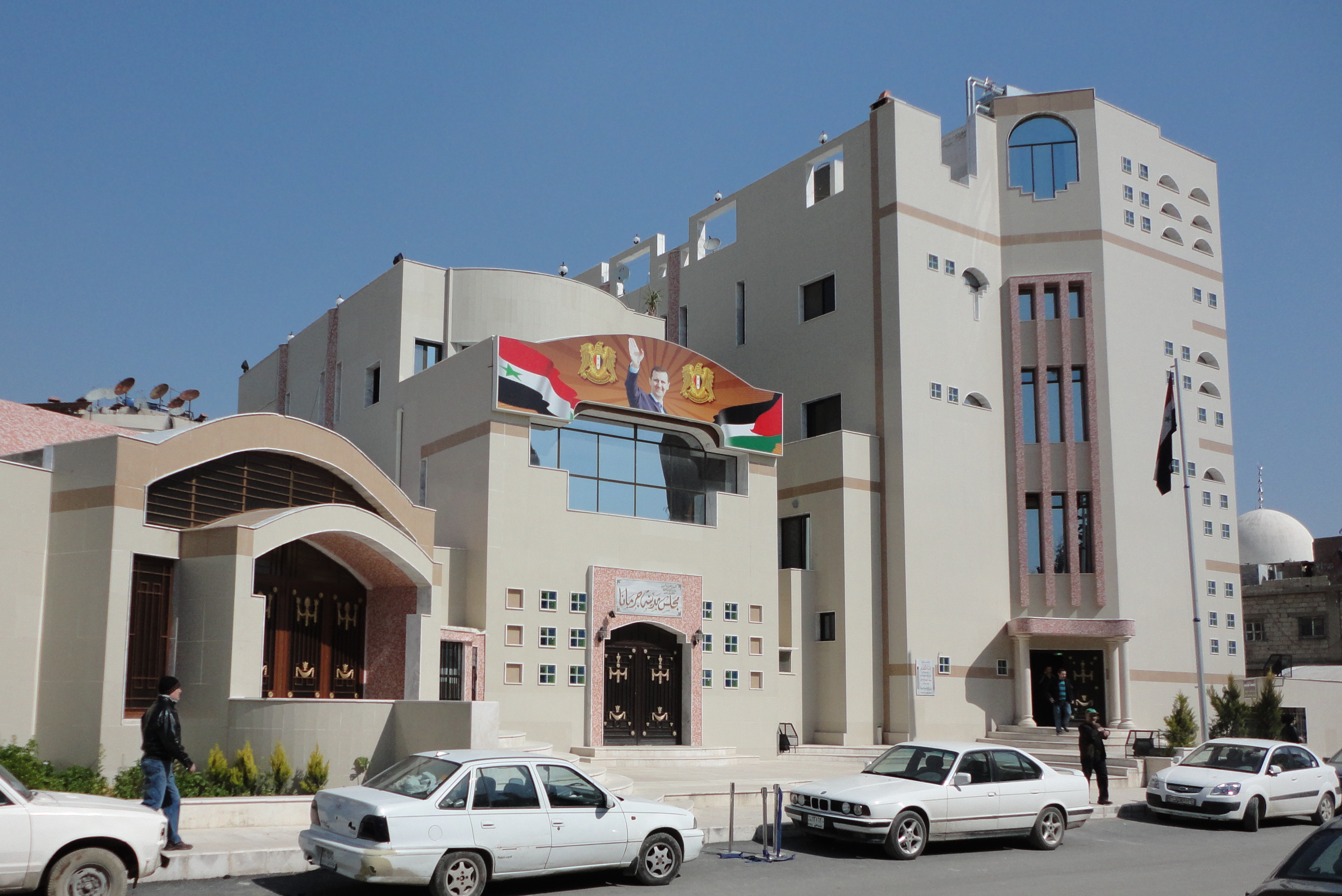
- Jaramana city council

- Location in Syria
- Coordinates: 33°29′N 36°21′E
- Country: Syria
- Governorate: Rif Dimashq
- District: Markaz Rif Dimashq
- Subdistrict: Jaramana

Area
  - City: 5.95 km^{2} (2.30 sq mi)
  - Land: 5.95 km^{2} (2.30 sq mi)
  - Water: 0 km^{2} (0 sq mi) 0%
  - Urban: 5.95 km^{2} (2.30 sq mi)
- Elevation: 670 m (2,200 ft)

Population (2004 census)
  - City: 114,363
- Time zone: UTC+2 (EET)
  - Summer (DST): UTC+3 (EEST)
- Climate: BSk

Jaramana (Arabic: جرمانا, romanized: Jaramānā) is a city in southern Syria, administratively part of the Rif Dimashq Governorate in the Ghouta plain. Its location, 3 kilometers southeast of the Syrian capital, makes it a bustling town in the greater Damascus metropolitan area, with a mostly Christian and Druze population.

== History ==
Jaramana was visited by Syrian geographer Yaqut al-Hamawi in the early 13th-century and noted it was "a district of the Ghautah of Damascus."

On August 28, October 29 and November 28, 2012, the town was hit by car bombings killing over 50 civilian residents, including several Iraqi and Palestinian refugees. Later on December 12, the Institute for the Study of War reported the presence of Popular Committees (local self-defense militias formed to defend communities from armed extremists) in the area, along with the pro-government Shabiha who worked closely with government forces there.

On March 20, 2018, rockets were fired at the town by unknown assailants, which resulted in the death of at least 44 people while injuring another 23.

On March 1, 2025, clashes occurred between the Syrian caretaker government and local Druze gunmen.

== Demographics ==
Since 2003 and the beginning of the Iraq War, large numbers of Iraqis have immigrated to Jaramana. According to the 2004 official census, the population of the city was 114,363. By 2009, the refugee wave has swelled the population from around 100,000 to over 250,000.

The refugee wave in Jaramana included a significant Assyrian Christian population from Iraq. In October 2006, the Assyrian community in Jaramana finally received a priest from Mosul, Iraq. The priest, Arkan Hana Hakim, claims there are now 2,000 Assyrian Iraqi refugees in the town Jaramana alone.

There is also a Palestinian refugee camp near the town bearing its same name.

Jaramana is known for its rich Druze heritage as the majority of the inhabitants of the city are Druze and Syrian Christians. There are several Druze shrines and many churches in this city which is near the mainly Christian part of Damascus. Its current population is at least 500,000 - 1,000,000 with rapid growth in recent years.

== Religious buildings ==
- Maqam al-Khidr (Druze Shrine)

== Bibliography ==
- le Strange, Guy (1890). Palestine Under the Moslems: A Description of Syria and the Holy Land from A.D. 650 to 1500. Committee of the Palestine Exploration Fund.
