= National Guard (Suwayda) =

Druze military coalition in Suwayda, Syria

- قوَّات الحرس الوطنيّ
- Logo of the National Guard Forces
- Other name: Unified National Army
- Founder: Sheikh Hikmat al-Hijri
- Leaders: Sheikh Hikmat al-Hijri (spiritual leader, recognized authority)
- Military leader: Jalaa Abu Daqqa
- Spokesperson: Talal Amer
- Dates active: 23 August 2025 – present
- Merger of: Over 40 Druze militias
- Country: Syria
- Allegiance: Hikmat al-Hijri
- Headquarters: Sweida Governorate
- Status: Active
- Size: 4,000–5,000 (claimed at the founding) c. 12,000 (September 2025 estimate)
- Wars: Aftermath of the Syrian civil war; Druze insurgency in Southern Syria; Southern Syria clashes (July 2025–present); Suwayda coup d'état attempt; 2026 Jordanian strikes on Syria; 2026 Iran war; Syria in the 2026 Iran war

The National Guard (Arabic: الحرس الوطني, romanized: al-Ḥaras al-Waṭanī) is a Druze paramilitary group and united front based in Suwayda Governorate, southern Syria. It was announced on 23 August 2025 as a unified force of multiple local factions to coordinate military and security efforts in the governorate.

== Formation ==
On 23 August 2025, amid a wave of clashes and instability in Southern Syria, a number of armed groups in Suwayda issued statements declaring their merger under the umbrella of the "National Guard".

According to their founding declaration, the move was intended to create "an organized and solid force entrusted with protecting the mountain and its people".

The groups emphasized their "absolute commitment to the decisions of the spiritual leadership represented by Sheikh Hikmat al-Hijri". (Note: Spiritual leadership of the Druze in Syria is split into two since the 2010s, one is headed by Hikmat al-Hijri, the other is mutually headed by Hammoud al-Hinnawi and Youssef Jarbou.)

== Objectives ==
The National Guard declared itself as the "official military institution representing the Druze community" in the governorate. Its announced primary objectives include:

- Unifying local armed factions into a single command structure.
- Defending Suwayda and the Druze community against external threats.
- Preserving the Unitarian Druze identity.
- Cooperating with other "auxiliary forces" operating in the region.

== Organization ==
=== Structure ===
The National Guard describes itself as a fully merged force rather than a loose coalition. Its leadership has pledged loyalty to the guidance of the Druze spiritual authority in Suwayda, represented by Sheikh Hikmat al-Hijri. The Institute for the Study of War reported on 25 August that around 40 groups were united to form the National Guard.

==== Founding groups ====
The following notable groups endorsed the formation of the National Guard the day it was announced:

1. Gathering of the Mountain's Sons
2. Mountain Youth Relief
3. Mountain Brigade
4. Anti-Terrorism Force
5. Sheikh al-Karama Forces
6. Al-Ulya Forces
7. Local Forces
8. Mount Tod Forces
9. The Conquerors
10. Den of the Mountain Forces
11. Hamza Knights Forces
12. Southern Sun Forces
13. Dhiab Hamza Forces
14. Al-Fahd Forces
15. Guardians of the Frontiers
16. Sultan Forces
17. Sword of Justice Forces
18. Al-Ghayara Relief
19. Al-Nashama Relief
20. Shield of al-Lajat Forces
21. As-Suwayda Operations
22. Khayyal Group
23. Thunder Banner – Ta'ara
24. Shield of the Mountain Forces – Zain al-Din
25. Banner Relief – Activated Mountain Tribes
26. Druze Protection Units
27. Al-Asail Forces
28. Unified Army
29. Jaysh al-Muwahhidin
30. 164th Brigade
31. Saif al-Haqq Forces

The National Guard has been described as a merger of the involved groups.

According to Enab Baladi, other groups that later joined include "Men of Dignity, (Note: The Men of Dignity Movement "initially declined to join the new military formation". Later however, they "issued a statement welcoming the announcement of local factions uniting under an "organized military body", describing it as a necessary step at a time when the Druze community is defending its existence "against covetous invaders".) the Unitarian Popular Resistance, Southern Shield Forces, Mountain Shield Forces, Lions of the Mountain Forces, Shield of Tawhid, Sahwat al-Khedr Shield, Mimas and Tal al-Lawz, Men of al-Lajat and Men of al-Kafr", while the 164th Brigade joined on 24 August. The Suwayda Military Council later joined.

In October 2025, the Institute for the Study of War reported that several Druze factions in Suwayda Governorate continued to join under the banner of the National Guard.

== Reactions ==
Laith al-Balous criticized the group for its ties to the Sword of Justice Forces and the Al-Fahd Forces, noting their ties to Assad-era figures Ali Mamlouk and Kifah Moulhem, as well as drug trafficker Raji Falhout.
