= Aftermath of the Syrian civil war =

Series of clashes and disputes in Syria

- Part of the Middle Eastern crisis (2023–present)
- Military situation as of 20 August 2026 at 22:39 AST Syria: Syrian Arab Republic (Syrian transitional government) De facto entities: Administrative Council of Jabal Bashan (Note: Replaced the Supreme Legal Committee in Suwayda on 7 April 2026.) (National Guard in insurgency) Foreign occupations: State of Israel (Israeli occupation and invasion) (Note: Israel occupied the Golan Heights after 1967, but this is not recognized by the United Nations or any member states except Israel, the United States, and Colombia. Israel launched a new invasion of Syria on 8 December 2024 during the fall of Damascus, taking advantage of the power vacuum created by the fall of the Assad regime to increase the amount of territory it controlled by several hundred square miles.) United Nations Administration: UNDOF Zone (most areas are currently occupied by Israel); Other states/Quasi-states Involved (no territories): Russia (operates the Tartus naval base and the Khmeimim Air Base); Turkey (troops stationed in Syria); Islamic State (terrorist activities in Syria); (full list of factions, detailed map)
Date	8 December 2024 – present (1 year, 11 months, 1 week and 4 days)
Location	Syria
Status	Ongoing

Belligerents
- Full list of factions

Casualties and losses
- Total killed: 13,996 (December 2024 – September 2026)

Disputes and clashes in Syria have continued following the fall of the Assad regime in December 2024, which many sources consider the end of the Syrian civil war. Numerous actors are involved, including clashes between the newly-formed Syrian caretaker government and later the Syrian transitional government led by the former emir of Hay'at Tahrir al-Sham (HTS) and incumbent president Ahmed al-Sharaa, Assad loyalists, Alawite groups, and Druze insurgents; clashes between elements of the Turkish-backed Syrian National Army (SNA) and the government on one side, and formerly the Kurdish-led Syrian Democratic Forces (SDF) on the other; as well as an Israeli invasion and occupation of the demilitarized buffer zone in southwestern Syria.

== Background ==
Syrian opposition offensives which overthrew Assad's regime in 11 days

On 27 November 2024, a coalition of opposition groups called the Military Operations Command, led by Hay'at Tahrir al-Sham and the Southern Operations Room, launched a major offensive against the Syrian Army and other pro-government forces in Aleppo, Idlib, Hama and Homs Governorates. This was followed by other rebel offensives from the Southern Operations Room, the SDF and the Syrian Free Army which all began seizing Syrian government territory in the country's south and east. On 29 November, rebel forces entered Aleppo as Syrian Army positions collapsed across the country. On 7 December, rebel forces entered Damascus and the next day, on 8 December, Bashar al-Assad was reported to have fled the capital. The Syrian Army confirmed Assad was no longer in power and had fled the country, resulting in the collapse of his regime and ending over 60 years of Ba'athist rule and 54 years under the Assad dynasty. Assad and his family fled to Moscow and were granted asylum in Russia. The fall of Assad has been said to mark the end of the Syrian civil war.

Syrian prime minister Mohammad Ghazi al-Jalali recognized the transfer of power to the Syrian Salvation Government, which established a caretaker government in Damascus with Mohammed al-Bashir serving as the prime minister. Ahmed al-Sharaa, the leader of the Syrian Salvation Government and emir of Hay'at Tahrir al-Sham, became de facto leader of Syria.

On 8 December 2024, the day that the Assad regime fell, Israel invaded southern Syria, subsuming the Golan Heights buffer zone and capturing Quneitra, Mount Hermon, and surrounding towns and villages, while also carrying out a bombing campaign against Syrian military bases. Israel has since maintained a military occupation of the buffer zone. The Turkish-backed SNA launched an offensive against the SDF, which ended with the capture of Manbij on 11 December.

At the Syrian Revolution Victory conference held in Damascus on 29 January 2025, the new government appointed al-Sharaa as president of Syria during the transitional phase and announced the dissolution of several armed militias and their integration into the Syrian Army under the Ministry of Defense.

== North and East Syria ==
=== SDF–SNA clashes ===
Clashes broke out between SDF and SNA forces as SDF forces began to enter government-controlled towns in northern Aleppo, which government forces were retreating from due to the HTS-led offensive on Aleppo from Idlib. On 1 December 2024, SNA captured the towns of as-Safirah, Khanasir and the Kuweires airbase, while clashes occurred between SNA and SDF in the Sheikh Najjar district of Aleppo city.

On 6 December 2024, the SNA launched an offensive targeting the SDF-controlled city of Manbij. As the last SDF-controlled area west of the Euphrates, Manbij represented a crucial strategic point for Turkey's goal of pushing the SDF eastward beyond the river to enable the SNA to advance toward Kobani. According to the SOHR and the pro-SDF thinktank Foundation for Defense of Democracies (FDD), Turkey conducted drone strikes on SDF positions in Manbij. On 9 December 2024, the SOHR reported, the SDF withdrew from most of Manbij after intense fighting with the SNA and Turkish airstrikes on Qarqozaq bridge. On 11 December, Mazloum Abdi, commander-in-chief of the SDF, announced that SDF soldiers "will be withdrawn from the area as soon as possible" following a US-brokered ceasefire agreement. On 12 December 2024, a truce mediated by the United States was announced, though it was ended days later. On 17 December 2024, the truce was extended by a week. Turkish Armed Forces launched airstrikes in the vicinity of Kobani later that month.

On 23 December 2024, the SDF's Manbij Military Council (MMC) launched a counteroffensive in the eastern countryside of Aleppo to regain control of positions around the Tishrin Dam and to gain further territory along the Euphrates River. Fighting was halted following the signing of the 10 March agreement, between the SDF and the Syrian transitional government.

=== 10 March agreement ===
On 10 March 2025, the SDF signed the 10 March agreement with the Syrian caretaker government, agreeing to integrate into Syria's state institutions, securing minority rights, establishing a ceasefire throughout Syria, and retaining limited authority over North and East Syria.

=== SDF–Syrian transitional government clashes ===
Delays in implementing the 10 March agreement, with both sides accusing each other of obstruction, along with the cancellation of the SDF–STG talks in Paris on 25 July and again on 9–10 August, heightened hostilities between the SDF and the Syrian transitonal government, which ultimately led to clashes between the two.

The first clashes were reported on 2 August 2025, near Dayr Hafir and al-Khafsah. On 12 August, one Syrian Army soldier was killed in clashes with the SDF near Dayr Hafir. In addition the government's Ministry of Information claimed that two civilians were killed and three injured. Coinciding with the clashes the Foundation for Defense of Democracies (FDD) warned of a 'wider conflict' if the US does not remain fully engaged in preventing the collapse of the March agreement.

==== Aleppo clashes ====
On 6 October 2025, clashes erupted between forces affiliated with the Syrian Democratic Forces and government troops in the neighborhoods of Ashrafiyah and Sheikh Maqsoud. Following the confrontation, government forces closed all roads leading into the two neighborhoods, effectively restricting movement and access. Residents protested the closures, demanding freedom of movement, and some demonstrations were met with tear gas and live fire by security forces. Heavy exchanges of fire, including small arms and medium weapons, were reported in the neighborhoods, resulting in casualties on both sides and displacing some families. Kurdish authorities accused the government-aligned forces of attempting to infiltrate the neighborhoods and targeting civilians. The Syrian Ministry of Defense stated that army movements in northern and northeastern Syria respond 'to repeated SDF attacks on civilians and security forces'. Calm returned to the Kurdish-majority neighborhoods of Sheikh Maqsoud and Ashrafiyah after a preliminary agreement between Syrian government forces and the Syrian Democratic Forces.

=== Anti-ISIS operations ===
Operations against ISIS sleeper cells continued after the fall of the Assad regime. In eastern Syria in particular, the SDF, in coordination with the Global Coalition, carried out 79 security operations, resulting in the arrest of 203 ISIS members, including senior figures, in 2025. These operations also led to the killing of more than 14 ISIS members, including commanders.

On 13 December 2025, two U.S. soldiers and an U.S. civilian interpreter were killed by an alleged Islamic State gunman in the city of Palmyra, central Syria. The gunman was shot dead by security forces during the attack. According to the Syrian Interior Ministry, the attacker was a new recruit in Syria's internal security forces who was suspected of Islamic State ties.

=== Other Incidents ===
On November 10, 2026, on Kafraya road, Northern Idlib, unidentified gunmen assassinated an Uzbeki former member of HTS in a drive-by style shooting.

On November 11, 2026, an alleged former aide to Suhayl al-Hasan and reputed pro-Assadist insurgent named Yazan Abbas, was killed in a raid by the Internal Security Forces in the village of Ain al-Labneh, Tartus Governorate. A four-man cell under the control of Abbas where also arrested.

== See also ==
- Syria in the 2026 Iran war
- Syrian civil war
