= Capture of Salkhad =

Coordinates: 32°29′38″N 36°42′38″E

Battle of Salkhad
- Part of The Great Syrian Revolt
Date	19–20 July 1925
Location	Salkhad, Jabal al-Arab, Syria
Result	Druze victory

Belligerents
France: Army of the Levant	Druze rebels

Commanders and leaders
(France) Gen. Maurice Sarrail (France) Tommy Martin	Sultan Pasha al-Atrash; Mit'ib al-Atrash

Strength
40 (officers and Mandatory employees)	250 (cavalry)

Casualties and losses
2 wounded	None

The capture of Salkhad refers to the clash between the Druze rebel forces of Sultan Pasha al-Atrash and a unit of the French Mandate based in Salkhad on 20 July 1925. It would become the first confrontation of the Great Syrian Revolt. Preceding the battle, on 19 July, al-Atrash's forces shot down a French reconnaissance plane, the first shots of the revolt, and captured its injured pilots. The next day, rebels captured Salkhad and its French garrison without facing significant resistance.

== Background ==
In 1918, at the end of World War I, Ottoman rule in Syria came to end when their army was driven out by British forces and their Hashemite Arab allies during the Arab Revolt. Between 1918 and 1920 the Hashemite king Faisal ruled nominally from Damascus, but France was granted a mandate over Syria by the League of Nations in 1920. Britain and France had previously agreed to divide the Ottoman Empire's Arab territories between themselves in the 1916 Sykes-Picot Agreement. After Faisal's army was defeated in the Battle of Maysalun, French forces gained control of Syria, later dividing into several autonomous entities, including Jabal Druze State based on the southeastern, mainly Druze-inhabited Jabal al-Arab mountain region. Tensions grew between the French authorities and the Druze leadership, as the latter viewed the former as encroaching on their territory and not respecting their traditions.

In early July 1925 five Druze leaders were summoned to Damascus by the French High Commissioner Maurice Sarrail, ostensibly to decrease tensions between the Mandate and the Druze community. However, the Druze leaders, three of whom actually showed up, were instead arrested and incarcerated in the desert prison of Palmyra. Upon learning of their imprisonment, Sultan Pasha al-Atrash, one of the two summoned leaders who chose not meet Sarrail, began to rally his forces in preparation for a revolt against French rule in all of Syria.

== French garrison surrender ==
In mid-July Sultan and his cousin Mit'ib, the other summoned Druze leader who did not leave for Damascus, began an expedition to assemble their troops, beginning with their kinsmen in Rasas and al-Qurayya, and then onto the al-Kafr, Baka, Umm al-Rumman, al-Ghariyah, Malah and Orman, all satellite villages of Salkhad, the second largest town of the Jabal. In Orman, on 19 July, the first shots of what would become the Great Syrian Revolt were fired as al-Atrash's forces gunned down a French reconnaissance plane surveilling their ground force, which numbered 250, all cavalry. The plane crashed, but its two pilots survived, albeit wounded. They were captured by the Ali Mustafa al-Atrash, then being a young teenager, and sheltered in his family's home, while others from Orman set the plane on fire.

On 20 July al-Atrash's forces entered and occupied Salkhad, calling its men to arms in the central square, to which many responded. They laid siege to the French garrison, but no resistance was encountered. The garrison, which consisted of 40 officers and government employees surrendered and the rebels proceeded to set on fire and reclaim all French-governmental buildings in the town, including the library of Salkhad's French delegation and the police station.

== Aftermath ==
The following day al-Atrash and his rebels departed further up the Jabal and more people from al-Kafr and Muslim members of the region's principal Bedouin tribes, Sulut and Sardiyya, joined the rebels. On the orders of High-Commissioner Maurice Sarrail, commandant Tommy Martin, the French commander in al-Suwayda, the capital of Jabal Druze State, dispatched 160 French soldiers under the command of Captain Normand to retrieve the French pilots and restore governmental over Salkhad and its vicinity. Al-Atrash's forces intercepted the French column at al-Kafr, killing most of the entire force, including Normand in a half-hour-long battle. Afterward, most Druze leaders of the Jabal joined al-Atrash's efforts and Syrian nationalists throughout the country were inspired to partake in the revolt.

== See also ==
- Great Syrian Revolt
- Ayyash Al-Haj
- Fawzi al-Qawuqji
- Yusuf al-'Azma
- Abd Al-Rahman Shahbandar
- Sultan al-Atrash
- Mandate for Syria and the Lebanon
- Henri Gouraud
- Syria
- Adham Khanjar
- Ibrahim Hananu
- Hasan al-Kharrat
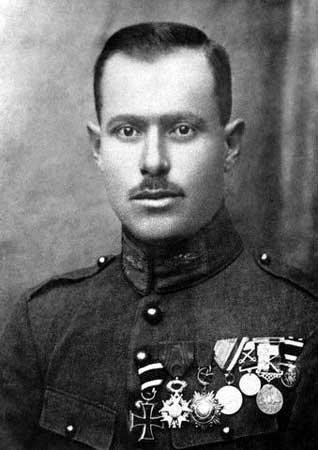
Fawzi al-Qawuqji

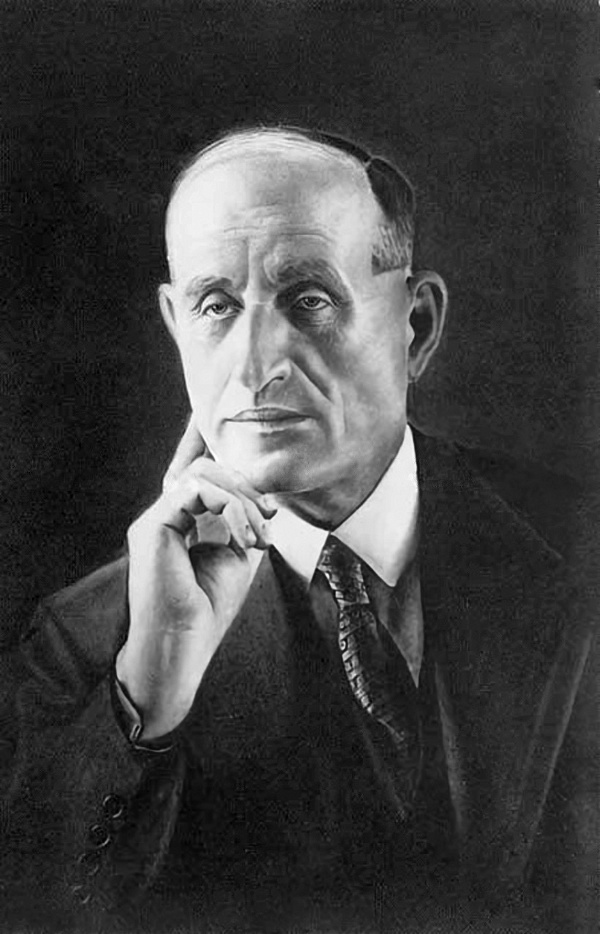
Abd Al-Rahman Shahbandar

Ayyash Al-Haj

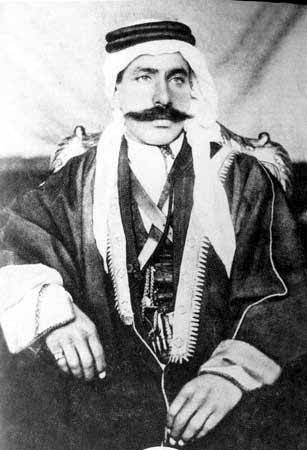
Sultan al-Atrash

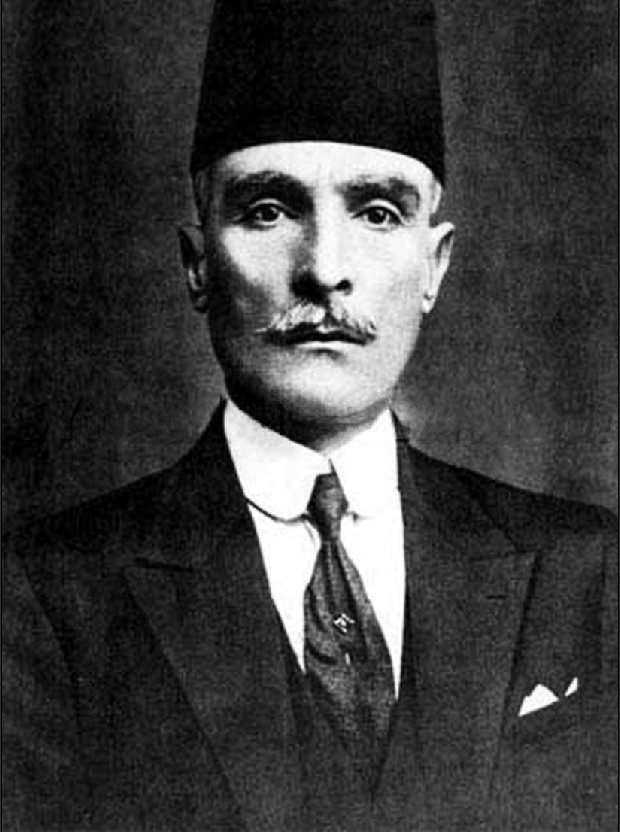
Ibrahim Hananu

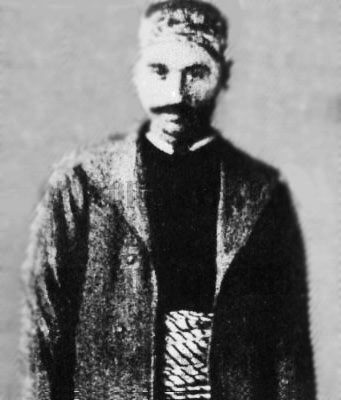
Hasan al-Kharrat

== Bibliography ==
- Barr, James (2012). A Line in the Sand: The Anglo-French Struggle for the Middle East, 1914–1948. W. W. Norton & Company. ISBN 978-0-393-07065-1.
- Betts, Robert Brenton (2010). The Druze. Yale University Press. ISBN 978-0-300-04810-0.
- Provence, Michael (2005). The Great Syrian Revolt and the Rise of Arab Nationalism. University of Texas Press. ISBN 978-0-292-70680-4.
