= Hout, Suwayda =

Hout حوط
- Village
- Location within Syria
- Coordinates: 32°29′23″N 36°36′31″E
- Grid position: 301/211
- Country: Syria
- Governorate: Suwayda
- District: Salkhad
- Subdistrict: Qurayya

Population (2004 census)
  - Total: 873
- Time zone: UTC+2 (EET)
  - Summer (DST): UTC+3 (EEST)

Hout (Arabic: حوط, also spelled Hut) is a village in southern Syria, administratively part of the Suwayda Governorate, located south of Suwayda. Nearby localities include Umm ar-Rumman to the south, Samad to the southwest, Bosra to the west, Nimrah and al-Qurayya to the north and Salkhad to the east. According to the Syria Central Bureau of Statistics (CBS), Hout had a population of 873 in the 2004 census. Its inhabitants are predominantly Druze.

== History ==
In 1596, Hout appeared in the Ottoman tax registers as Huta, and was part of the nahiya (subdistrict) of Bani Malik as-Sadir in the Qada Hauran. It had an all Muslim population consisting of 5 households and 2 bachelors. The residents paid a fixed tax rate of 20% on wheat, barley, summer crops, goats and beehives, as well as on "occasional revenues" and for a press for olive oil or grape syrup; a total of 3,180 akçe.

A survey conducted by Edward Robinson and Eli Smith in 1838 described Hout as situated in the Nukrah, east of Busrah, and being in a state of ruin. The Nukrah refers to the southern part of the Hauran plain.

== See also ==
- Druze in Syria

== Bibliography ==
- Hütteroth, W.-D.; Abdulfattah, K. (1977). Historical Geography of Palestine, Transjordan and Southern Syria in the Late 16th Century. Erlanger Geographische Arbeiten, Sonderband 5. Erlangen, Germany: Vorstand der Fränkischen Geographischen Gesellschaft. ISBN 3-920405-41-2.
- Robinson, E.; Smith, E. (1841). Biblical Researches in Palestine, Mount Sinai and Arabia Petraea: A Journal of Travels in the year 1838. Vol. 3. Boston: Crocker & Brewster.
