= Dhibin =

Dhibin ذيبين Dhaybin, Thibin
- Town
- Location in Syria
- Coordinates: 32°26′13″N 36°33′53″E
- PAL: 297/205
- Country: Syria
- Governorate: Suwayda
- District: Salkhad
- Subdistrict: Dhibin

Population (2004)
  - Total: 2,562

Dhibin (Arabic: ذيبين; also spelled Dhaybin or Thibin) is a town in southern Syria, administratively part of the Salkhad District of the Suwayda Governorate. It is located south of Suwayda, near the southern border with Jordan. Nearby localities include Bakka to the north, Salkhad to the northeast, Umm ar-Rumman to the east, Samaj to the west and Samad to the northwest. In the 2004 census it had a population of 2,562. It is the administrative center of the Dhibin Nahiyah, which consisted of three villages with a collective population of 6,900 in 2004. Its inhabitants are predominantly Druze, with a Sunni Muslim Bedouin minority.

== History ==
Dhibin was a mainly grain-growing village in the late 16th century, during Ottoman rule. In the Ottoman tax registers of 1596, it was a village located the nahiya (subdistrict) of Butayna, in the Qadaa of Hauran. It had a population of twelve households and four bachelors, all Muslims. They paid a fixed tax-rate of 25% on agricultural products, including wheat, barley, summer crops, goats and beehives, in addition to occasional revenues; a total of 1,000 akçe.

By the early 19th century, the village had been abandoned like many of the other villages of Jabal Hauran due to Bedouin depredations. In 1838 Dhibin was noted as a "ruin or deserted", located in the Nukrah, south of Busrah. Druze migrants from other parts of Syria populated the villages of Jabal Hauran by the 1860s. Dhibin became part of the sheikhdom of the Bani al-Atrash clan under the leadership of Ismail al-Atrash between 1860 and 1867. The inhabitants of Dhibin moved to annex and seasonally inhabit the village of Umm el-Jimal (in modern-day Jordan) in 1909. Dhibin's families divided the ruins of its ancient houses among themselves in 1910. They lived there on and off until around 1930, when they permanently abandoned Umm al-Jimal. Dhibin was the birthplace of Salim Hatum, a Syrian Army officer and key participant in the Baathist-led 1966 Syrian coup d'état.

== Archaeology ==
Funerary material from the Middle Bronze Age has been found at Dhibin. A mid-4th-century inscription on a ruined building recording the name of Roman emperor Valentinian I has been found in the village as well.

== See also ==
- Druze in Syria

== Bibliography ==
- Akkermans, P.; Schwartz, Glenn M. (2003). The Archaeology of Syria: From Complex Hunter-Gatherers to Early Urban Societies (c. 16,000-300 BC). Cambridge University Press.
- Batatu, H. (1999). Syria's Peasantry, the Descendants of Its Lesser Rural Notables, and Their Politics. Princeton University Press. ISBN 0691002541.
- Brown, Robin M. (2009). "The Druze Experience at Umm al-Jimal: Remarks on the History and Archaeology of the Early 20th Century Settlement" (PDF). Studies in the History and Archaeology of Jordan. X. Amman.
- Firro, Kais (1992). A History of the Druzes, Volume 1. BRILL. ISBN 9789004094376.
- Hütteroth, W.-D.; Abdulfattah, K. (1977). Historical Geography of Palestine, Transjordan and Southern Syria in the Late 16th Century. Erlanger Geographische Arbeiten, Sonderband 5. Erlangen, Germany: Vorstand der Fränkischen Geographischen Gesellschaft. ISBN 3-920405-41-2.
- Kennedy, D. (2004). The Roman Army in Jordan (PDF). The Council for British Research in the Levant.
- Robinson, E.; Smith, E. (1841). Biblical Researches in Palestine, Mount Sinai and Arabia Petraea: A Journal of Travels in the year 1838. Vol. 3. Boston: Crocker & Brewster.
