= Rasas =

Rasas رساس Rsas
- Village
- Location within Syria
- Coordinates: 32°38′34″N 36°34′26″E
- Grid position: 297/228
- Country: Syria
- Governorate: Suwayda
- District: Suwayda
- Subdistrict: Suwayda

Population (2004 census)
  - Total: 3,332
- Time zone: UTC+2 (EET)
  - Summer (DST): UTC+3 (EEST)

Rasas (Arabic: رساس, also spelled Rsas) is a village in southern Syria, administratively part of the Suwayda Governorate, located south of Suwayda. Nearby localities include Ira to the southwest, Sahwet Blatah to the east, ar-Raha to the northeast and Umm Walad to the west. According to the Syria Central Bureau of Statistics (CBS), Rasas had a population of 3,332 in the 2004 census. Its inhabitants are predominantly Druze, with a Sunni Muslim Bedouin minority.

== History ==
In 1596 Rasas appeared in the Ottoman tax registers under the name of Irsas (diz nazd Kafr), being part of the nahiya of Bani Nasiyya in the Qada of Hauran. It had an entirely Muslim population consisting of 20 households and 10 bachelors. They paid a fixed tax-rate of 40% on agricultural products, including wheat, barley, summer crops, goats and bee-hives; a total of 3,880 akçe. Part of the income (8 out of 24 parts) went to a Waqf.

In 1838 Rasas was noted by Eli Smith.

== Religious buildings ==
- Maqam Job/Ayyub (Druze Shrine)

== See also ==
- Druze in Syria

== Bibliography ==
- Hütteroth, W.-D.; Abdulfattah, K. (1977). Historical Geography of Palestine, Transjordan and Southern Syria in the Late 16th Century. Erlanger Geographische Arbeiten, Sonderband 5. Erlangen, Germany: Vorstand der Fränkischen Geographischen Gesellschaft. ISBN 3-920405-41-2.
- Robinson, E.; Smith, E. (1841). Biblical Researches in Palestine, Mount Sinai and Arabia Petraea: A Journal of Travels in the year 1838. Vol. 3. Boston: Crocker & Brewster.
