= Tahula, Suwayda =

Tahula تحولا
- Village
- Location within Syria
- Coordinates: 32°26′49″N 36°45′30″E
- PAL: 316/207
- Country: Syria
- Governorate: Suwayda
- District: Salkhad
- Subdistrict: Salkhad

Population (2004 census)
  - Total: 288
- Time zone: UTC+2 (EET)
  - Summer (DST): UTC+3 (EEST)

Tahula (Arabic: تحولا) is a village situated in the Salkhad District of Suwayda Governorate, in southern Syria. According to the Syria Central Bureau of Statistics (CBS), Tahula had a population of 288 in the 2004 census. Its inhabitants are predominantly Druze.

== History ==
In 1596, it appeared in the Ottoman tax registers as Tahula (dir nazd Nawas al-Laja), as part of the nahiya (subdistrict) of Bani Malik as-Sadir, in the Hauran Sanjak. It had an entirely Muslim population consisting of 37 households and 15 bachelors. They paid a fixed tax-rate of 40% on agricultural products, including wheat (1800 a.), barley (900 a.), goats and beehives (200 a.), in addition to "occasional revenues" (50 a.); the taxes totaled 3,000 akçe.

in 1838, Eli Smith noted it as Tehuleh, a ruin located east of Salkhad.

== See also ==
- Druze in Syria

== Bibliography ==
- Hütteroth, W.-D.; Abdulfattah, K. (1977). Historical Geography of Palestine, Transjordan and Southern Syria in the Late 16th Century. Erlanger Geographische Arbeiten, Sonderband 5. Erlangen, Germany: Vorstand der Fränkischen Geographischen Gesellschaft. ISBN 3-920405-41-2.
- Robinson, E.; Smith, E. (1841). Biblical Researches in Palestine, Mount Sinai and Arabia Petraea: A Journal of Travels in the year 1838. Vol. 3. Boston: Crocker & Brewster.
