= Anz, Suwayda =

Anz عنز Anez
- Village
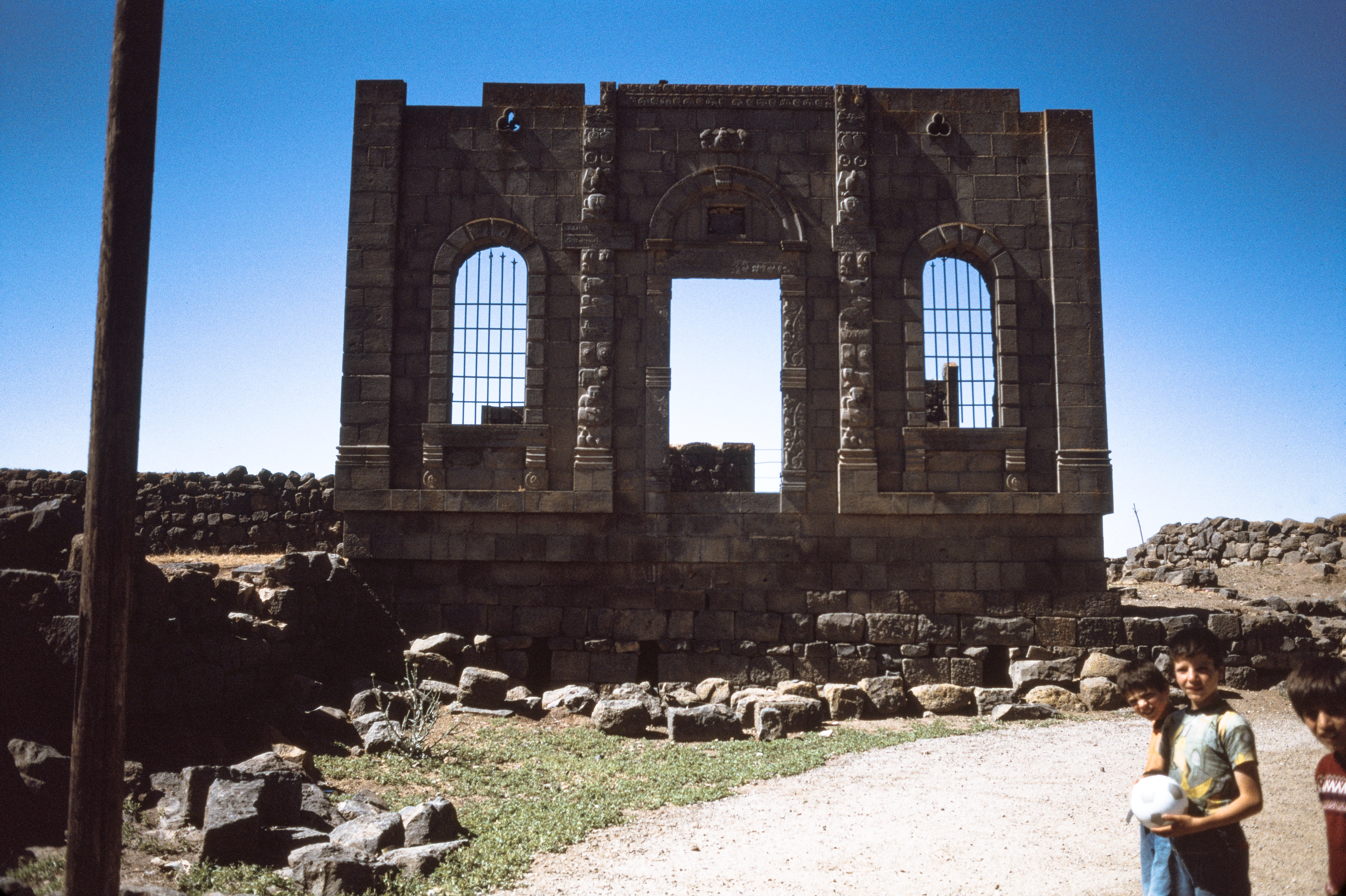

- Location in Syria
- Coordinates: 32°24′17″N 36°41′11″E
- Grid position: 308/202
- Country: Syria
- Governorate: Suwayda
- District: Salkhad
- Subdistrict: Ghariyah

Population (2004)
  - Total: 1,102

Anz (Arabic: عنز; also spelled Anez) is a village in southern Syria, administratively part of the Salkhad District of the Suwayda Governorate. In the 2004 census it had a population of 1,102. Its inhabitants are Druze, Christians and Sunni Muslims.

== History ==
In 1596, it appeared in the Ottoman tax registers Anaz, as part of the nahiya (subdistrict) of Bani Malik as-Sadir, in the Hauran Sanjak. It had an entirely Muslim population consisting of 15 households and 12 bachelors. They paid a fixed tax-rate of 40% on agricultural products, including wheat (5100 a.), barley (1800 a.), summer crops (1200 a.), goats and beehives (100 a.); the taxes totaled 8,000 akçe.

in 1838, Eli Smith noted the place was in ruined, and that it was located east of Salkhad.

== Demographics ==
According to statistics from 1927, Anz had a population consisting of 327 Christians, 227 Druze, and 204 Sunni Muslims.

In 2011, the Melkite Greek Catholic Church had approximately 200 believers.

== Religious buildings ==
- Holy Cross Greek Orthodox Church
- St. George Greek Orthodox Church
- Nativity of the Virgin Melkite Greek Catholic Church
- Omar ibn al-Khattab Mosque
- Khalwa (Druze Majlis)

== See also ==
- Druze in Syria
- Christians in Syria

== Bibliography ==
- Hütteroth, W.-D.; Abdulfattah, K. (1977). Historical Geography of Palestine, Transjordan and Southern Syria in the Late 16th Century. Erlanger Geographische Arbeiten, Sonderband 5. Erlangen, Germany: Vorstand der Fränkischen Geographischen Gesellschaft. ISBN 3-920405-41-2.
- Robinson, E.; Smith, E. (1841). Biblical Researches in Palestine, Mount Sinai and Arabia Petraea: A Journal of Travels in the year 1838. Vol. 3. Boston: Crocker & Brewster.
