= Samma al-Baradan =

Samma al-Baradan صما البردان Samma al-Bardan
- Village
- Location within Syria
- Coordinates: 32°24′51″N 36°46′07″E
- PAL: 316/203
- Country: Syria
- Governorate: Suwayda
- District: Salkhad
- Subdistrict: Salkhad

Population (2004 census)
  - Total: 1,296
- Time zone: UTC+2 (EET)
  - Summer (DST): UTC+3 (EEST)

Samma al-Baradan (Arabic: صما البردان) is a village situated in the Salkhad District of Suwayda Governorate, in southern Syria. According to the Syria Central Bureau of Statistics (CBS), Samma al-Baradan had a population of 1,296 in the 2004 census. Its inhabitants are predominantly Druze.

== History ==
In 1596, it appeared in the Ottoman tax registers as Samma (dir nazd Kafr Taman), as part of the nahiya (subdistrict) of Bani Malik as-Sadir, in the Hauran Sanjak. It had an entirely Muslim population consisting of 20 households and 10 bachelors. They paid a fixed tax-rate of 40% on agricultural products, including wheat (6000 a.), barley (900 a.), summer crops (1600 a.) goats and beehives (300 a.), in addition to "occasional revenues" (200 a.); the taxes totalled 9,000 akçe.

In 1838, Eli Smith noted it as Summa el-Buradan, a ruin located east of Salkhad.

== See also ==
- Druze in Syria

== Bibliography ==
- Hütteroth, W.-D.; Abdulfattah, K. (1977). Historical Geography of Palestine, Transjordan and Southern Syria in the Late 16th Century. Erlanger Geographische Arbeiten, Sonderband 5. Erlangen, Germany: Vorstand der Fränkischen Geographischen Gesellschaft. ISBN 3-920405-41-2.
- Robinson, E.; Smith, E. (1841). Biblical Researches in Palestine, Mount Sinai and Arabia Petraea: A Journal of Travels in the year 1838. Vol. 3. Boston: Crocker & Brewster.
