= Ar-Rafqah =

Ar-Rafqah الرافقة
- Village
- Location within Syria
- Coordinates: 32°27′34″N 36°40′21″E
- PAL: 307/208
- Country: Syria
- Governorate: Suwayda
- District: Salkhad
- Subdistrict: Salkhad

Population (2004 census)
  - Total: 101
- Time zone: UTC+2 (EET)
  - Summer (DST): UTC+3 (EEST)

Ar-Rafqah (Arabic: الرافقة) is a village situated in the Salkhad District of Suwayda Governorate, in southern Syria. According to the Syria Central Bureau of Statistics (CBS), Ar-Rafqah had a population of 101 in the 2004 census. Its inhabitants are predominantly Druze.

== History ==
In 1838, Eli Smith noted it as er-Rafikeh, a ruin located east of Salkhad.

== Religious buildings ==
- Maqam Prophet Shuaib (Druze Shrine)

== See also ==
- Druze in Syria

== Bibliography ==
- Robinson, E.; Smith, E. (1841). Biblical Researches in Palestine, Mount Sinai and Arabia Petraea: A Journal of Travels in the year 1838. Vol. 3. Boston: Crocker & Brewster.
