= Samma, Suwayda =

Village in as-Suwayda, Syria

Samma صما، صما الهنيدات Samma al-Hneidat
- Village
- Location within Syria
- Coordinates: 32°46′06″N 36°24′59″E
- PAL: 283/242
- Country: Syria
- Governorate: Suwayda
- District: Suwayda
- Subdistrict: Mazraa

Population (2004 census)
  - Total: 213
- Time zone: UTC+2 (EET)
  - Summer (DST): UTC+3 (EEST)

Samma (Arabic: صما, also known as Samma al-Hneidat (Arabic: صما الهنيدات) is a village in southern Syria, administratively part of the Suwayda Governorate. According to the Syria Central Bureau of Statistics (CBS), Samma had a population of 213 in the 2004 census. Its inhabitants are predominantly Christians, while Druze and Sunni Muslim Bedouins represent a minority.

== Demographics ==
According to statistics from 1927, Samma had a population consisting of 370 Christians, 66 Sunni Muslims, and 21 Druze.

In 2011, the Melkite Greek Catholic Church had approximately 1,000 believers.

== Religious buildings ==
- St. Elias (St. Elijah) Melkite Greek Catholic Church

== See also ==
- Christians in Syria
- Druze in Syria
