= Lubayn =

Lubayn لبين Lubbein
- Village
- Location in Syria
- Coordinates: 32°55′9″N 36°23′43″E
- Grid position: 280/258
- Country: Syria
- Governorate: Suwayda
- District: Shahba
- Subdistrict: Ariqah

Population (2004)
  - Total: 1,730
- Time zone: UTC+2 (EET)
  - Summer (DST): UTC+3 (EEST)

Lubayn (Arabic: لبين, also spelled Lubbein) is a village in the Suwayda Governorate in southwestern Syria. It is situated in the southern part of the Lejah plateau, northwest of the city of Suwayda. According to the Syria Central Bureau of Statistics (CBS), Lubayn had a population of 1,730 in the 2004 census. Its inhabitants are predominantly Druze.

== History ==
There are Byzantine-era (4th-6th centuries CE) ruins in Lubayn.

In 1596 it appeared in the Ottoman tax registers as Libbin and was part of the nahiya of Bani Abdullah in the Hauran Sanjak. It had an entirely Muslim population consisting of 20 households and 7 bachelors. They paid a fixed tax-rate of 40% on agricultural products, including wheat, barley, summer crops, goats and beehives; the taxes totalled 3,200 akçe.

The modern-day village was established by Druze from the Murshid family sometime between 1867 and 1883.

== Religious buildings ==
- Maqam al-Khidr (Druze Shrine)

== See also ==
- Druze in Syria

== Bibliography ==
- Firro, Kais (1992). A History of the Druzes. Vol. 1. BRILL. ISBN 9004094377.
- Hütteroth, W.-D.; Abdulfattah, K. (1977). Historical Geography of Palestine, Transjordan and Southern Syria in the Late 16th Century. Erlanger Geographische Arbeiten, Sonderband 5. Erlangen, Germany: Vorstand der Fränkischen Geographischen Gesellschaft. ISBN 3-920405-41-2.
