= Muhsina al-Mahithawi =

Syrian economist and politician (born 1970)

- محسنة المحيثاوي

Head of the Suwayda Governorate Council
- Incumbent
- Assumed office 4 March 2025
- Governor: Mustafa al-Bakour

Personal details
- Born: 1970 (age 55–56) Labeen, Suwayda Governorate, Ba'athist Syria
- Education: Damascus University

Muhsina al-Mahithawi (Arabic: محسنة المحيثاوي, romanized: Muḥsina al-Maḥīthāwī; born 1970) is a Syrian economist and politician currently serving as head of Suwayda's Governorate Council. Al-Mahithawi was director of the Real Estate Bank in Suwayda and head of the province's financial inspection authority.

== Early life and education ==
Al-Mahithawi was born in 1970 in the village of Lubayn, located in the Suwayda Governorate. She belongs to the Druze religious community. Al-Mahithawi completed her undergraduate studies at the Damascus University in 1995, earning a degree in commerce and economics.

== Career ==
Al-Mahithawi began her career in the early 1990s, working within the Suwayda Directorate of Finance. Over the years, she held several positions, including heading the Real Estate Bank in Suwayda Governorate. She also worked with the province’s financial audit and inspection authority, focusing on issues related to administrative transparency and combating corruption.

In March 2023, she resigned from her role as head of the treasury department, citing dissatisfaction with the prevalence of corruption in the administration. Al-Mahithawi was also a participant in local political movements and was one of the early women involved in the peaceful protests in Suwayda, centered at Al-Karama Square, calling for reforms and civil rights.

In a phone interview with Al Arabiya on 14 January 2025, she denied news reports saying that she was appointed governor of Suwayda on 31 December 2024. She also denied reports that she had met with Syrian caretaker government officials in Damascus.

On March 4, she was appointed head of the Suwayda Governorate Council by Suwayda governor Mustafa al-Bakour.
