= Al-Ariqah =

Town in southern Syria

Ariqah عريقة
- Town
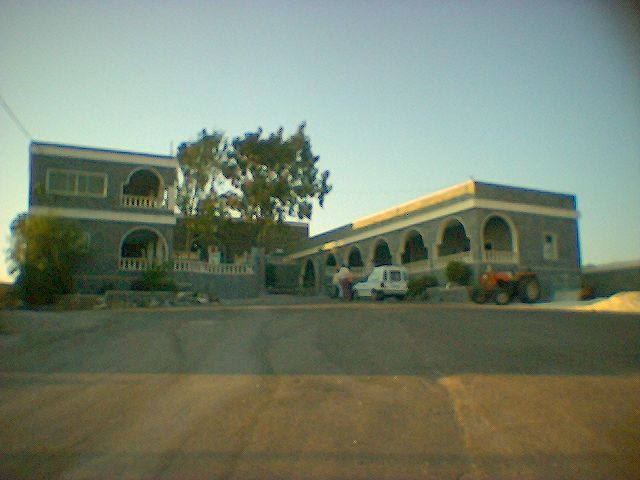
- Shrine of Ammar bin Yasser in Ariqah

- Location in Syria
- Coordinates: 32°53′20″N 36°29′00″E
- Grid position: 288/255
- Country: Syria
- Governorate: Suwayda
- District: Shahba
- Subdistrict: Ariqah
- Elevation: 800 m (2,600 ft)

Population (2004 census)
  - Total: 3,798
  - Density: 386/km^{2} (1,000/sq mi)
- Time zone: UTC+2 (EET)
  - Summer (DST): +3

Ariqah (Arabic: عريقة, romanized: ʿArīqa), formerly known as Ahira, is a town in southern Syria with a population of about 3,798, according to the Syria Central Bureau of Statistics (CBS) in the 2004 census. It is located in the heart of the rocky volcanic plateau of Lajat. Administratively Ariqah is situated in the Shahba District of Suwayda Governorate. Ariqah is known for its volcanic cave which is located in a 10 meters deep hollow in the centre of the village. This cave is known as Ariqa Cave which extends from 2 to 3 kilometers in the old lava streams, it is the biggest known cave in southern Syria. Its inhabitants are predominantly Druze, with a Sunni Muslim Bedouin minority.

== History ==
=== Roman period ===
Ariqah has been proposed as the location of a Roman-period sanctuary based on several inscriptions and architectural remains. One Greek-language inscription, dated to 182 AD, records the construction of a building dedicated to an ancestral deity by a veteran and was found reused as a lintel in a modern building, suggesting that it may have belonged before to a monumental structure. The identity of this deity is uncertain. Another inscription found at the same location mentions the local deity Aumos, which has been proposed as a possible identification.

One inscription dated to 139–140 AD mentions the erection of a building, which scholars have suggested may have been associated with a sanctuary. A fragmentary statue of Al-Lat/Athena depicted wearing a peplos (Greek garment) and holding a shield decorated with a gorgon (female monster), is now preserved in the Suwayda National Museum.

=== Byzantine period ===
Historically ‘Arīqah was considered the centre of the inaccessible Lajat, many houses from the Byzantine epoch were found in the town and they are still inhabited by locals, there is also an old ruined Byzantine monastery in the town known as "Deir Ariqa".

=== Ottoman era ===
In 1596 Al-Ariqah appeared in the Ottoman tax registers as 'Ahiri and was part of the nahiya of Bani Abdullah in the Hauran Sanjak. It had an entirely Muslim population consisting of 18 households and 3 bachelors. The villagers paid a fixed tax rate of 25% on wheat, barley, summer crops, goats and/or beehives and a water mill; a total of 6,500 akçe.

In 1838, it was noted as Ahiry, a Druze and Catholic village, situated "in the Lejah, south of Dama".

== Religious buildings ==
- Maqam Ammar bin Yasser (Druze Shrine)

== See also ==
- Druze in Syria

== Bibliography ==
- Hütteroth, W.-D.; Abdulfattah, K. (1977). Historical Geography of Palestine, Transjordan and Southern Syria in the Late 16th Century. Erlanger Geographische Arbeiten, Sonderband 5. Erlangen, Germany: Vorstand der Fränkischen Geographischen Gesellschaft. ISBN 3-920405-41-2.
- Mazzilli, Francesca (2018). Rural Cult Centres in the Hauran: Part of the broader network of the Near East (100 BC–AD 300). Archaeopress. pp. 164–165. doi:10.2307/j.ctvndv916. ISBN 978-1-78491-954-2.
- Robinson, E.; Smith, E. (1841). Biblical Researches in Palestine, Mount Sinai and Arabia Petraea: A Journal of Travels in the year 1838. Vol. 3. Boston: Crocker & Brewster.
