= Sahwet Blatah =

Sahwet Blatah سهوة بلاطة Sahwet Blata
- Village
- Location within Syria
- Coordinates: 32°38′25″N 36°36′12″E
- Country: Syria
- Governorate: Suwayda
- District: Suwayda
- Subdistrict: Suwayda

Population (2004 census)
  - Total: 2,647
- Time zone: UTC+2 (EET)
  - Summer (DST): UTC+3 (EEST)

Sahwet Blatah (Arabic: سهوة بلاطة) is a village in southern Syria, administratively part of the Suwayda District of the Suwayda Governorate. According to the Syria Central Bureau of Statistics (CBS), Sahwet Blatah had a population of 2,647 in the 2004 census. Its inhabitants are predominantly Druze, with a Sunni Muslim Bedouin minority.

== Religious buildings ==
- Maqam Sheikh Abu Hussein Mohammed Al-Hanawi (Druze Shrine)

== See also ==
- Druze in Syria
