= As-Sawra as-Saghira =

As-Sawra as-Saghira الصورة الصغيرة
- Town
- Location in Syria
- Coordinates: 33°1′53″N 36°34′27″E
- PAL: 271/297
- Country: Syria
- Governorate: Suwayda
- District: Shahba
- Subdistrict: Sawra as-Saghira

Population (2004)
  - Total: 1,517
- Time zone: UTC+2 (EET)
  - Summer (DST): +3

As-Sawra as-Saghira (Arabic: الصورة الصغيرة) is a town situated in the Shahba District of As Suwayda Governorate, in southern Syria. According to the Syria Central Bureau of Statistics (CBS), As-Sawra as-Saghira had a population of 1,517 in the 2004 census. Its inhabitants are predominantly Druze.

== Religious buildings ==
- Maqam Abel (Druze Shrine)

== See also ==
- Druze in Syria
