= Malah, Suwayda =

Malah ملح
- Town
- Location in Syria
- Coordinates: 32°30′22″N 36°51′07″E
- PAL: 324/213
- Country: Syria
- Governorate: Suwayda
- District: Salkhad
- Subdistrict: Malah

Population (2004)
  - Total: 4,363
- Time zone: UTC+2 (EET)
  - Summer (DST): +3

Malah (Arabic: ملح) is a town is situated in the Salkhad District of Suwayda Governorate, in southern Syria. The town is the administrative center of the Malah Nahiya. According to the Syria Central Bureau of Statistics (CBS), Malah had a population of 4,363 in the 2004 census. Its inhabitants are predominantly Druze, with a Christian minority.

== History ==
In 1596, it appeared in the Ottoman tax registers as Malah, as part of the nahiya (subdistrict) of Bani Malik as-Sadir, in the Hauran Sanjak. It had an entirely Muslim population consisting of 23 households and 10 bachelors. They paid a fixed tax-rate of 40% on agricultural products, including wheat (3750 a.), barley (2700 a.), summer crops (600 a.) goats and beehives (150 a.), in addition to "occasional revenues" (120 a.) and a water mill (300 a.); the taxes totalled 7,050 akçe. 7/24 of the revenue went to a waqf.

In 1838, Eli Smith noted it as Melah, a ruin located east of Salkhad.

== Religious buildings ==
- St. John the Baptist Greek Orthodox Church
- Saints Sergius and Bacchus Greek Orthodox Shrine
- Maqam Sheikh Hussein Safi (Druze Shrine)

== See also ==
- Druze in Syria
- Christians in Syria

== Bibliography ==
- Hütteroth, W.-D.; Abdulfattah, K. (1977). Historical Geography of Palestine, Transjordan and Southern Syria in the Late 16th Century. Erlanger Geographische Arbeiten, Sonderband 5. Erlangen, Germany: Vorstand der Fränkischen Geographischen Gesellschaft. ISBN 3-920405-41-2.
- Robinson, E.; Smith, E. (1841). Biblical Researches in Palestine, Mount Sinai and Arabia Petraea: A Journal of Travels in the year 1838. Vol. 3. Boston: Crocker & Brewster.
