= Bakka, Suwayda =

Bakka بكا
- Village
- Location within Syria
- Coordinates: 32°28′59″N 36°34′20″E
- PAL: 298/210
- Country: Syria
- Governorate: Suwayda
- District: Salkhad
- Subdistrict: Dhibin

Population (2004 census)
  - Total: 2,563
- Time zone: UTC+2 (EET)
  - Summer (DST): UTC+3 (EEST)

Bakka (Arabic: بكا) is a village situated in the Salkhad District of Suwayda Governorate, in southern Syria. According to the Syria Central Bureau of Statistics (CBS), Bakka had a population of 2,563 in the 2004 census. Its inhabitants are predominantly Druze.

== History ==
In 1596, it appeared in the Ottoman tax registers as Bakka, as part of the nahiya (subdistrict) of Bani Malik as-Sadir, in the Hauran Sanjak. It had an entirely Muslim population consisting of 21 households and 10 bachelors. They paid a fixed tax-rate of 40% on agricultural products, including wheat (4200 a.), barley (1800 a.), summer crops (3200 a.), goats and beehives (150 a.), in addition to "occasional revenues"; the taxes totalled 9,500 akçe.

In 1838, Eli Smith noted it as Beka, a ruin located "in the Nukrah, east of Busrah", the Nukrah being the southern Hauran plain.

== Religious buildings ==
- Maqam Prophet Sabalan (Druze Shrine)

== See also ==
- Druze in Syria

== Bibliography ==
- Hütteroth, W.-D.; Abdulfattah, K. (1977). Historical Geography of Palestine, Transjordan and Southern Syria in the Late 16th Century. Erlanger Geographische Arbeiten, Sonderband 5. Erlangen, Germany: Vorstand der Fränkischen Geographischen Gesellschaft. ISBN 3-920405-41-2.
- Robinson, E.; Smith, E. (1841). Biblical Researches in Palestine, Mount Sinai and Arabia Petraea: A Journal of Travels in the year 1838. Vol. 3. Boston: Crocker & Brewster.
