= Ar-Raha =

Village in Suwayda, Syria

Ar-Raha الرحى
- Village
- Location in Syria
- Coordinates: 32°40′46″N 36°36′1″E
- Grid position: 300/232
- Country: Syria
- Governorate: Suwayda
- District: Suwayda
- Subdistrict: Suwayda

Population (2004 census)
  - Total: 5,711
- Time zone: UTC+2 (EET)
  - Summer (DST): +3

Ar-Raha (Arabic: الرحى) is a village situated in the Suwayda District of Suwayda Governorate, in southern Syria. According to the Syria Central Bureau of Statistics (CBS), Ar-Raha had a population of 5,711 in the 2004 census. Its inhabitants are predominantly Druze, with a Sunni Muslim Bedouin minority.

== Religious buildings ==
- Maqam Sultan Suleiman (Druze Shrine)

== See also ==
- Druze in Syria
