= Mustafa al-Bakour =

Syrian politician

- مصطفى البكور

Governor of Suwayda
- Incumbent
- Assumed office 3 March 2025 (Note: Briefly resigned from 23 May until 24 June 2025.)
- President: Ahmed al-Sharaa
- Preceded by: Akram Ali Muhammad

Personal details
- Born: Ba'athist Syria
- Profession: Politician

Military service
- Battles/wars: Syrian civil war; Druze insurgency in Southern Syria (2025–present); Southern Syria clashes (April–May 2025); Southern Syria clashes (July 2025–present)

Mustafa al-Bakour (Arabic: مصطفى البكور) is a Syrian politician who has been serving as the governor of Suwayda Governorate since March 2025, though had briefly resigned from 23 May until 24 June.

== Career ==
=== Syrian civil war ===
Al-Bakour previously served as a Syrian Salvation Government official in Harem.

=== Syrian transitional government and the aftermath of the Syrian civil war ===
Al-Bakour was a special envoy of the General Command to oversee the affairs of the Suwayda Governorate, stating that "The new leadership is giving Suwayda its full attention to change for the better".

On 3 March 2025, he was appointed governor of Suwayda Governorate; on 10 March 2025, Syrian President Ahmed al-Sharaa met with al-Bakour, and prominent Druze figure Hikmat al-Hijri.

On 21 May 2025, al-Bakour was assaulted in his office by a group seeking the release of Raghib Qarqout, a car thief in Damascus. The Al-Jabal Brigade began to confront the group while Men of Dignity protected al-Bakour; after this, on 23 May, he submitted his resignation from office without an official explanation.

On 24 June 2025, al-Bakour resumed his post and met with al-Hijri in Qanawat and Hammoud al-Hinnawi in Al-Hikma Hospital.

On 13 July 2025 during Southern Syria clashes (July 2025–present) he immediately called for calm, warning against sectarian strife and urging restraint.
