= Samad, Syria =

Samad صماد
- Village
- Location within Syria
- Coordinates: 32°28′34″N 36°31′16″E
- PAL: 293/209
- Country: Syria
- Governorate: Daraa
- District: Daraa
- Subdistrict: Bosra al-Sham

Population (2004 census)
  - Total: 3,098
- Time zone: UTC+3 (AST)

Samad (Arabic: صماد; transliteration: Ṣamād, also spelled Smad) is a village in southern Syria, administratively part of the Daraa Governorate, located east of Daraa and immediately southeast of Bosra. Other nearby localities include al-Qurayya to the northeast, Hout to the east and Dhibin to the southeast. According to the Syria Central Bureau of Statistics (CBS), Samad had a population of 3,098 in the 2004 census. Its inhabitants are predominantly Sunni Muslim.

== History ==
An inscription dating back was found in Samad dating back to the Roman era testifying that a "public speaker's rostrum" was built by the local Arab tribe of Daban (Dabanenoi) in the village of Samad.

During the late Mamluk era in the 15th century, Samad was the home of the Samadiyya branch of the Qadiriyya Sufi order founded by a certain Shaykh Salim, a student of Abd al-Qadir al-Gilani (died 1166). Leadership of the Samadiyya order was hereditary and led by Shaykh Salim's descendants from their zawiya (Sufi lodge) in Samad. In 1518, the Samadiyya order's sheikh (religious leader) Muhammad ibn Khalil ibn Ali ibn Isa ibn Ahmad al-Samadi (1505–1541) gained an audience with the Ottoman sultan Selim I and secured imperial support for his order (tariqa). He also relocated its principal zawiya to the as-Salihiyya suburb of Damascus in 1520 and then erected a new principal zawiya in the Shaghur neighborhood in 1525. The order was named after Samad and maintained its name after the move of its main headquarters to Damascus during the early Ottoman era.

Samad is possibly the place named Garita al-Janahiyya in the 1596 tax registers, being part of the nahiya (subdistrict) of Bani Malik as-Sadir in the Qada Hauran. It had an entirely Muslim population consisting of 32 households and 13 bachelors. They paid a fixed tax-rate of 40% on agricultural products, including wheat, barley, summer crops, goats and beehives, in addition to occasional revenues; a total of 11,000 akçe.

In 1838, it was noted as a ruin, Sumad, situated in "the Nukra [Hauran plain], south of Bosra".

=== Modern era ===
As of 1980, Samad was a village with an estimated population 1,500, consisting of eight clans. Between 1925 and at least 1980, the office of shaykh al-balad (village headman) has been filled by members of the al-Shuyukh clan.

== Bibliography ==
- Bakhit, Muhammad Adnan (1982). The Ottoman Province of Damascus in the Sixteenth Century. Librairie du Liban.
- Batatu, H. (1999). Syria's Peasantry, the Descendants of Its Lesser Rural Notables, and Their Politics. Princeton University Press. ISBN 0691002541.
- Hütteroth, W.-D.; Abdulfattah, K. (1977). Historical Geography of Palestine, Transjordan and Southern Syria in the Late 16th Century. Erlanger Geographische Arbeiten, Sonderband 5. Erlangen, Germany: Vorstand der Fränkischen Geographischen Gesellschaft. ISBN 3-920405-41-2.
- MacAdam, Henry Innes (1986). Studies in the History of the Roman Province of Arabia: The Northern Sector. British Archaeological Reports.
- Nahrawali, Muhammad ibn Ahmad (2005). Blackburn, Richard (ed.). Journey to the Sublime Porte: the Arabic Memoir of a Sharifian Agent's Diplomatic Mission to the Ottoman Imperial Court in the Era of Suleyman the Magnificent: The Relevant Text from Quṭb al-Dīn al-Nahrawālī's al-Fawāʼid al-sanīyah fī al-riḥlah al-Madanīyah wa al-Rūmīyah. Orient-Institut.
- Robinson, E.; Smith, E. (1841). Biblical Researches in Palestine, Mount Sinai and Arabia Petraea: A Journal of Travels in the year 1838. Vol. 3. Boston: Crocker & Brewster.
