= Al-Ghariyah =

Al-Ghariyah الغارية
- Town
- Location in Syria
- Coordinates: 32°23′27″N 36°38′49″E
- PAL: 304/200
- Country: Syria
- Governorate: Suwayda
- District: Salkhad
- Subdistrict: Ghariyah

Population (2004)
  - Total: 3,808
- Time zone: UTC+2 (EET)
  - Summer (DST): UTC+3 (EEST)

Al-Ghariyah (Arabic: الغارية) or Gheryeh is a town in Suwayda Governorate, in southern Syria. The town is the administrative center of the Ghariyah Nahiya. The town has a population of 3,808 as per the 2004 census. It is located 6 km (3.7 mi) north of the Jordan border. The towns population is predominantly composed of Druze people.

== History ==
In 1596 it appeared in the Ottoman tax registers as Gariyya al-Kubra and was part of the nahiya of Butayna in the Qada Hauran. It had an all Muslim population consisting of 76 households and 30 bachelors. The villagers paid a fixed tax rate of 40% on various agricultural products, including wheat (12000 a.), barley 900 a.), summer crops (2500 a.), goats and/or beehives (490 a.), in addition to "occasional revenues" (300 a.); a total of 16,190 akçe. 1/12 of the revenue went to a waqf.

In 1816, the English traveler James Silk Buckingham visited Gheryeh and wrote that its population numbered about fifty families, of whom around twenty were Greek Christians who had resettled there after being forced to leave the village of Debeen by Arabs. He added that the inhabitants were still vulnerable to pillage anyway.

== See also ==
- Druze in Syria

== Bibliography ==
- Buckingham, J.S. (1825). Travels among the Arab tribes inhabiting the countries east of Syria and Palestine.
- Hütteroth, W.-D.; Abdulfattah, K. (1977). Historical Geography of Palestine, Transjordan and Southern Syria in the Late 16th Century. Erlanger Geographische Arbeiten, Sonderband 5. Erlangen, Germany: Vorstand der Fränkischen Geographischen Gesellschaft. ISBN 3-920405-41-2.
