= Jumana Murad =

Syrian actress and producer (born 1973)

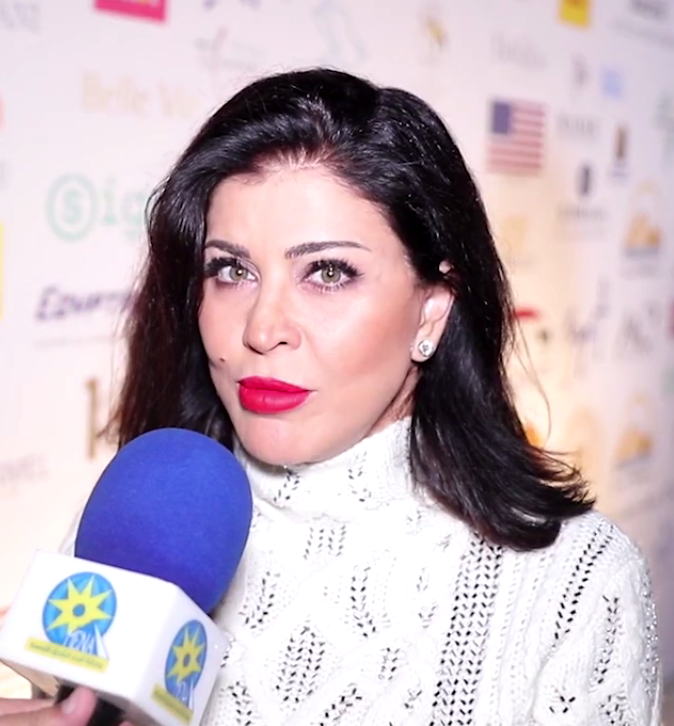
- Born: Jumana Nawaf Fahad Murad; April 1, 1973 (age 53); As-Suwayda, Syrian Arab Republic
- Occupation: 1998–present
- Spouses: Najdat Anzour (m. 2002; div. 2005) Rabie Besiso (m. 2013)
- Children: 2

Jumana Murad (Arabic: جومانا مراد; born on 1 April 1973 in As-Suwayda) is a Syrian actress and producer.

== Early life and career ==
Murad was born in As-Suwayda to a Druze family. Her mother is of Lebanese descent. She studied English literature in Damascus University. She began her career as presenter in Ajman TV. Her first act was in Pictures fregments in 1998. She also acted in Bab Al-Hara. She acted Zenobia role in 2007.

== Personal life ==
Since 2013, she has been married to Jordanian lawyer Rabie Besiso. She was previously married two times, first marriage was to Syrian director Najdat Anzour and the second was to a Syrian businessman whom she refused to acknowledge the name of. In February 2019, she gave birth to her first son Mohammed.

== Works ==
=== Series ===
- Pictures fragments (1998)
- Al Bawasel (2000)
- Al Masloob (2001)
- Searching for Saladin (2001)
- Escaping to summit (2002)
- Al Tareq (2004)
- The white thread (2005)
- Revenge of Rose (2006)
- Love biography (2007)
- Eve in history (2007)
- Shame Slang (2008)
- Like that we married (2008)
- Bab Al-Hara (3-5 season) (2008-2010)
- On the sea wave (2009)
- Witness proof (2010)
- Men Wanted (2011)
- Pharaoh (2013)
- Love School (2019)
- Moftaraq toroq (2024)

=== Films ===
- The Devils (2007)
- Shabaan Alfares (2008)
- Kabare (2008)
- Femininity seconds (2008)
- The Happiness (2009)
- Palm of Moon (2011)
- The Party (2013)
