= Umm ar-Rumman =

Umm ar-Rumman أم الرمان
- Village
- Location within Syria
- Coordinates: 32°25′28″N 36°37′24″E
- PAL: 302/203
- Country: Syria
- Governorate: Suwayda
- District: Salkhad
- Subdistrict: Dhibin

Population (2004 census)
  - Total: 1,775
- Time zone: UTC+2 (EET)
  - Summer (DST): UTC+3 (EEST)

Umm ar-Rumman (Arabic: أم الرمان) is a village situated in the Salkhad District of Suwayda Governorate, in southern Syria. According to the Syria Central Bureau of Statistics (CBS), Umm ar-Rumman had a population of 1,775 in the 2004 census. Its inhabitants are predominantly Druze , while Christians and Sunni Muslim Bedouins represent a minority.

== History ==
In 1596 it appeared in the Ottoman tax registers as Rumman and was part of the nahiya of Bani Malik as-Sadir in the Qada Hauran. It had an all Muslim population consisting of 40 households and 5 bachelors. The villagers paid a fixed tax rate of 20% on wheat (11250 a.), barley 5400 a.), summer crops (2000 a.), goats and/or beehives (400 a.), in addition to "occasional revenues" (500 a.); a total of 19,550 akçe.

In 1838 Um er-Rumman was noted as a "ruin or deserted", located in the Nukrah, south of Busrah. the Nukrah being the southern Hauran plain.

== Religious buildings ==
- St. George Greek Orthodox Church
- Maqam Ayyub/Job (Druze Shrine)

== See also ==
- Druze in Syria

== Bibliography ==
- Hütteroth, W.-D.; Abdulfattah, K. (1977). Historical Geography of Palestine, Transjordan and Southern Syria in the Late 16th Century. Erlanger Geographische Arbeiten, Sonderband 5. Erlangen, Germany: Vorstand der Fränkischen Geographischen Gesellschaft. ISBN 3-920405-41-2.
- Robinson, E.; Smith, E. (1841). Biblical Researches in Palestine, Mount Sinai and Arabia Petraea: A Journal of Travels in the year 1838. Vol. 3. Boston: Crocker & Brewster.
