= Salkhad =

Salkhad صَلْخَد
- City
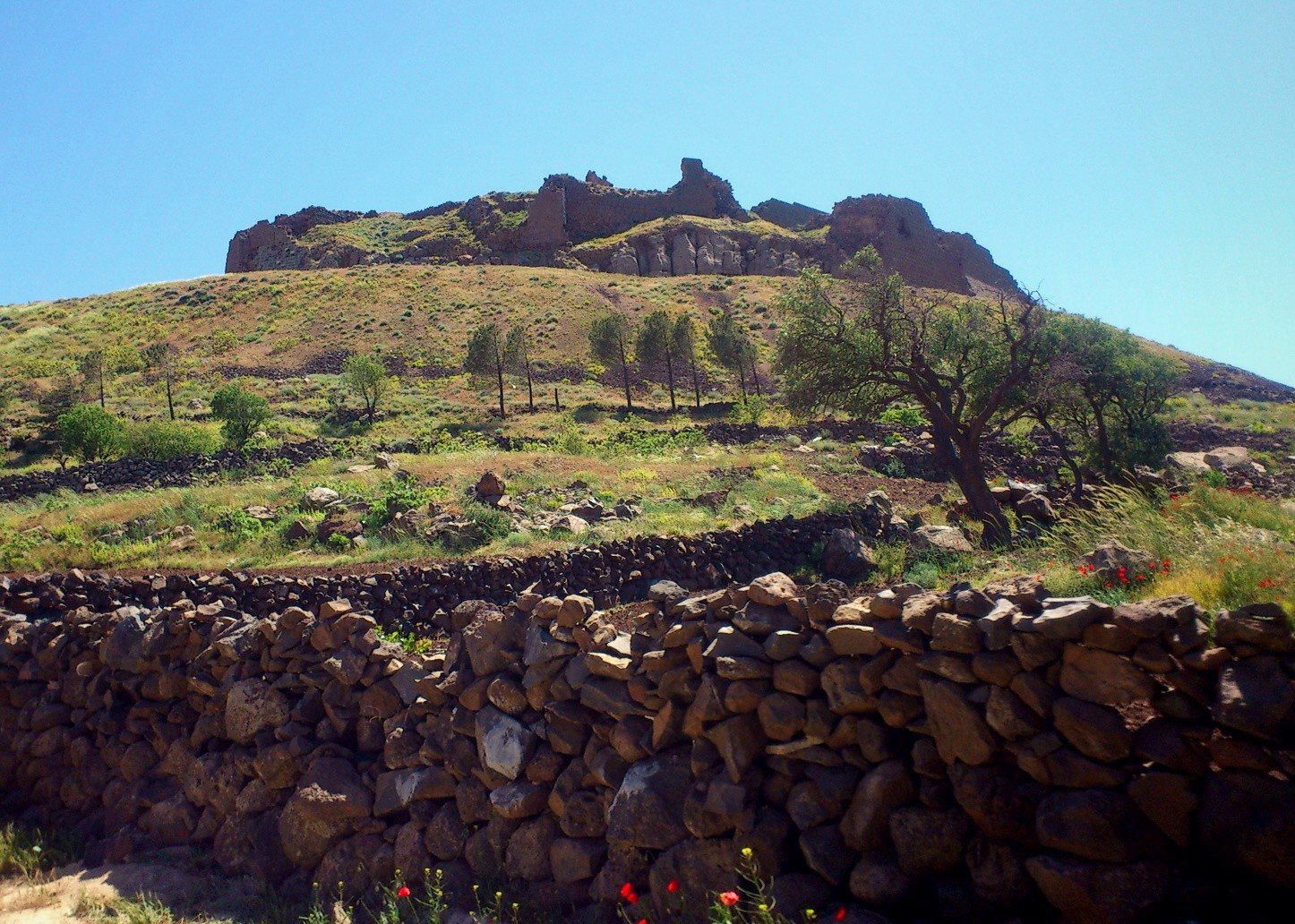
- Salkhad fortress

- Location in Syria
- Coordinates: 32°29′30″N 36°42′40″E
- PAL: 310/211
- Country: Syria
- Governorate: Suwayda
- District: Salkhad
- Subdistrict: Salkhad
- Elevation: 1,350 m (4,430 ft)

Population (2004 Census)
  - Total: 9,155
- Area code: 16

Salkhad (Arabic: صَلْخَد, romanized: Ṣalḫad) is a Syrian city in the Suwayda Governorate, southern Syria. It is the capital of Salkhad District, one of the governorate's three districts. It had a population of 9,155 inhabitants in the 2004 census. In Salkhad, Druze make up the predominant population, while Christians and Sunni Muslim Bedouins represent a minority.

It is located at 1350 metres above sea level in the central Jabal el Druze highlands.

== History ==
The city is mentioned four times in the Hebrew Bible as "Salcah" (Hebrew: סַלְכָּה, romanized: Salkā), a settlement in biblical Bashan. Beginning in the second century BC Salcah was a flourishing Nabataean city, where the gods Dushara and Allat were worshiped. A dedication to the goddess Allat, dated to year 17 of the reign of Malichus II, son of Aretas IV (AD 57), survives from the first century AD.

Afterwards it was incorporated into the Roman province of Arabia, it was one of the important cities in Hauran during Roman and later Byzantine epochs, Salkhad is indicated in the Madaba Map of the sixth century.

Due to the strategic position of the city overlooking Hauran plains to the west, the Ayyubid dynasty built a fortress in Salkhad between 1214–1247 to counter a possible attack of the Crusades into inner Hauran. It has also been said that al-Afdal ibn Salah ad-Din was exiled here by his uncle and brother al-Aziz Billah.

The importance of the city decreased after the Crusades, and it was occasionally overrun by Bedouins seeking pasture in the summer for their flocks.

=== Ottoman era ===
In 1596, Salkhad appeared in the Ottoman tax registers as Salhad (Sarhad) and was part of the nahiya of Bani Malik as-Sadir in the Hauran Sanjak. It had a Muslim population consisting of 55 households and 25 bachelors, and a Christian population of 50 households and 20 bachelors. The residents paid a fixed tax-rate of 40% on wheat, barley, summer crops, goats and beehives; a total of 36,500 akçe.

In 1838 Eli Smith noted that the place in ruins.

A number of Greek Orthodox Christians, of Ghassanid ancestry, successively remained in the region. The town itself was abandoned in the late 18th century, but was repopulated by Druze and Greek Orthodox Christian families from Mount Lebanon beginning in 1858.

During Ottoman times, the city enjoyed a feudal-type autonomy like much of the Jabal el Druze area under the chieftaincy of Al-Hamdan family and later Al-Atrash family, many battles against the Ottoman Empire took place in this region by the Druze locals to maintain their autonomy.

=== Modern era ===
In the early 20th century, the city was part of the 1921–1936 Druze state under the French Mandate of Syria, the state was gradually incorporated into Syria after the Syrian Revolution of 1925–1927 led by Sultan Al-Atrash.

The city now is the centre of Salkhad district of Suwayda Governorate, it is the southernmost district in Syria.

== Religious buildings ==
- St. John the Baptist Greek Orthodox Church
- Evangelical Baptist Church
- Maqam Sultan Suleiman (Druze Shrine)

== Climate ==
Salkhad has a cold semi-arid climate (Köppen climate classification: BSk). In winter there is more rainfall than in summer. The average annual temperature in Salkhad is 14.8 °C (58.6 °F). About 291 mm (11.46 in) of precipitation falls annually.

Climate data for Salkhad, elevation 1,447 m (4,747 ft)
Month	Jan	Feb	Mar	Apr	May	Jun	Jul	Aug	Sep	Oct	Nov	Dec	Year
Mean daily maximum °C (°F)	8.5 (47.3)	9.1 (48.4)	12.8 (55.0)	17.6 (63.7)	23.0 (73.4)	27.2 (81.0)	28.5 (83.3)	29.2 (84.6)	27.2 (81.0)	26.2 (79.2)	16.6 (61.9)	10.3 (50.5)	19.7 (67.4)
Daily mean °C (°F)	3.4 (38.1)	5.3 (41.5)	8.3 (46.9)	12.6 (54.7)	17.2 (63.0)	21.1 (70.0)	22.5 (72.5)	23.1 (73.6)	21.2 (70.2)	19.2 (66.6)	11.8 (53.2)	6.5 (43.7)	14.4 (57.8)
Mean daily minimum °C (°F)	−1.8 (28.8)	1.5 (34.7)	3.7 (38.7)	7.5 (45.5)	11.5 (52.7)	14.8 (58.6)	16.3 (61.3)	17.0 (62.6)	15.3 (59.5)	12.1 (53.8)	7.1 (44.8)	2.5 (36.5)	9.0 (48.1)
Average precipitation mm (inches)	80 (3.1)	62 (2.4)	65 (2.6)	27 (1.1)	8 (0.3)	0 (0)	0 (0)	0 (0)	0 (0)	10 (0.4)	26 (1.0)	60 (2.4)	338 (13.3)
Source: FAO

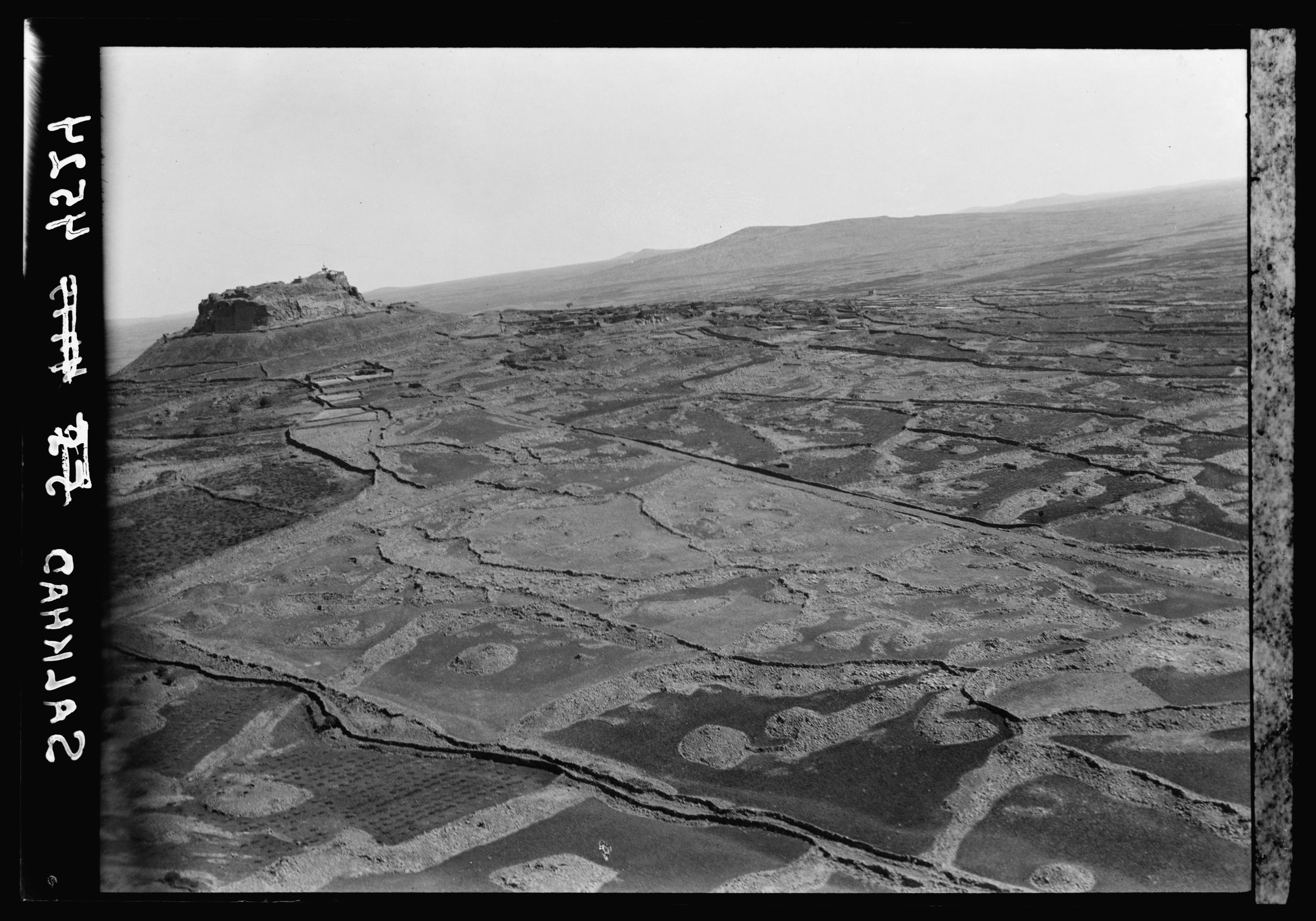
Castle of Salkhad, 1932

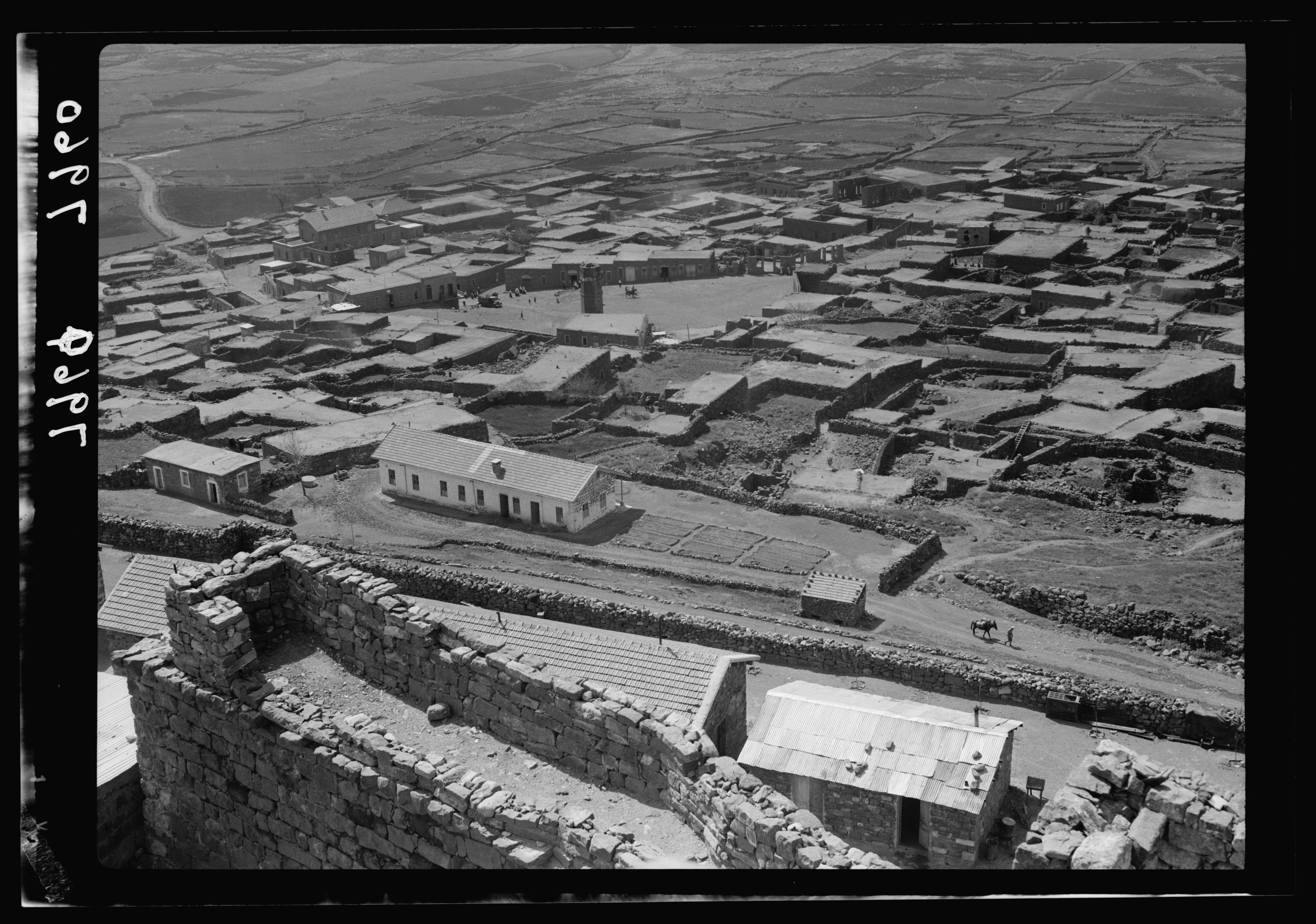
View of town from castle, 1938

== Archaeology ==
The fortress of Salkhad is the most important monument located in a hill inside the city, built between 1214 and 1247 by the Ayyubid dynasty as a part of their defences against the crusades. It is said that this fortress were built in the site of older Roman fortifications. A hexagonal basalt minaret still standing intact in the city's main square. Many Roman old time houses, still partially inhabited by locals. Nabatean, Roman and Ayyubid tombs are also there with decorative motifs.

== See also ==
- Druze in Syria
- Christians in Syria
- List of castles in Syria
- Capture of Salkhad

== Bibliography ==
- Firro, Kais (1992). A History of the Druzes. Vol. 1. BRILL. ISBN 9004094377.
- Hütteroth, W.-D.; Abdulfattah, K. (1977). Historical Geography of Palestine, Transjordan and Southern Syria in the Late 16th Century. Erlanger Geographische Arbeiten, Sonderband 5. Erlangen, Germany: Vorstand der Fränkischen Geographischen Gesellschaft. ISBN 3-920405-41-2.
- Robinson, E.; Smith, E. (1841). Biblical Researches in Palestine, Mount Sinai and Arabia Petraea: A Journal of Travels in the year 1838. Vol. 3. Boston: Crocker & Brewster.
