= Suwayda =

City in Syria

Suwayda ٱلسُّوَيْدَاء Al-Suwayda, Sweida
- City
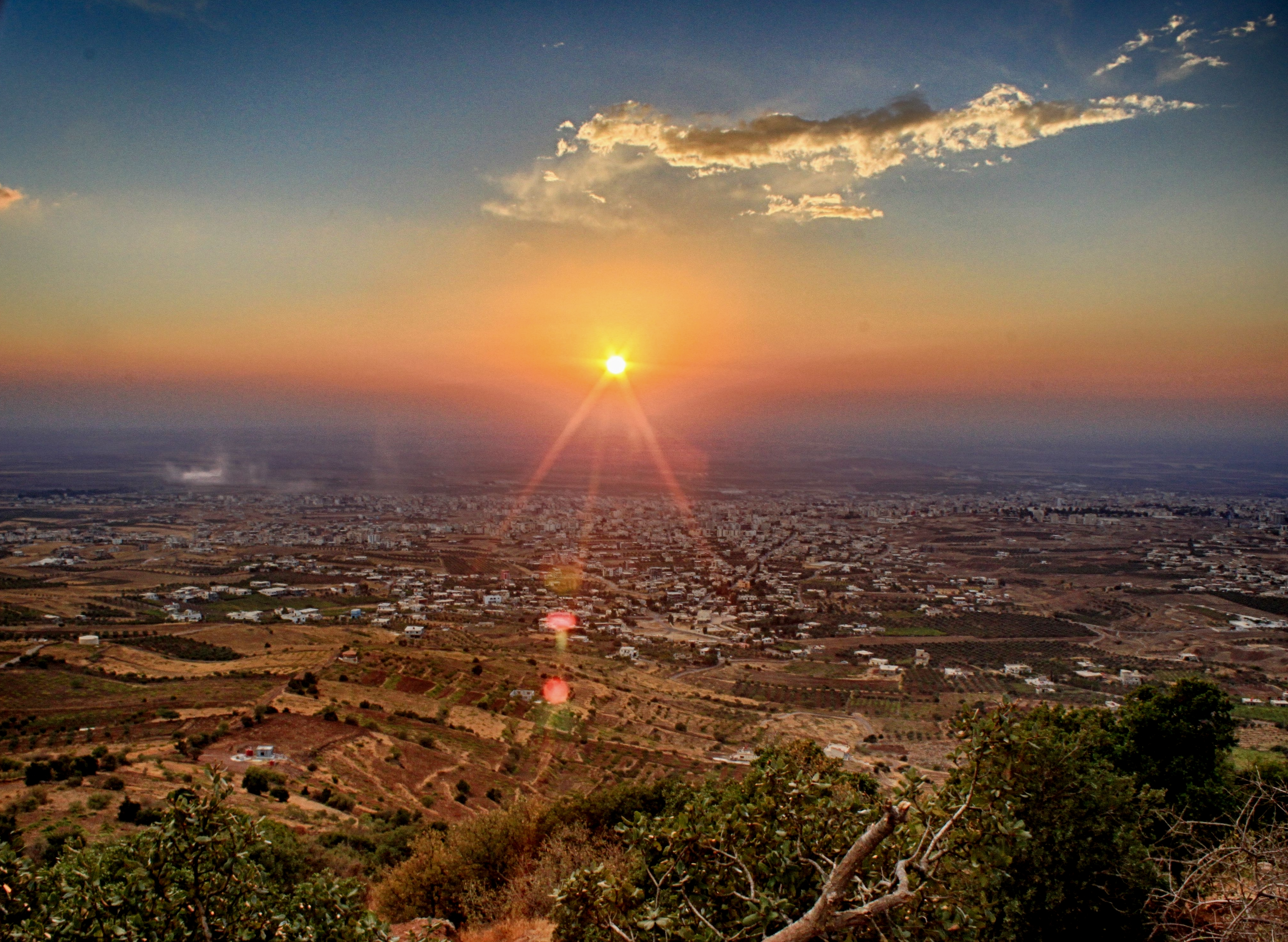
- Aerial view of Suwayda, October 2011

- Location of Suwayda within Syria Suwayda (Eastern Mediterranean)
- Coordinates: 32°42′45″N 36°34′00″E
- Grid position: 296/235
- Country: Syria
- Governorate: Suwayda
- District: Suwayda
- Subdistrict: Suwayda

Government
  - Head of Security file: Samer Shafiq Azi (de jure)
- Elevation: 3,540 ft (1,080 m)

Population (2004 census)
  - City: 73,641
  - Metro: 147,146
- Demonym(s): Arabic: سويداوي, romanized: Suwaydāwi
- Time zone: UTC+3 (AST)
- Area code: 16
- Geocode: C6147
- Climate: Csa

Suwayda (Arabic: ٱلسُّوَيْدَاء, romanized: as-Suwaydāʾ), also spelled Sweida, is a city located in southern Syria, close to the border with Jordan. It is a Druze-majority city, with small Christian and Sunni Muslim Bedouin minorities.

It is the capital of the Suwayda Governorate, one of Syria's 14 governorates, bordering Jordan in the South, Daraa Governorate in the West and Rif Dimashq Governorate in the north and east.

The city is sometimes referred to as "Little Venezuela" due to the city's influx of affluent Venezuelan Syrian immigrants. Many of them are descendants of Suwayda natives who emigrated to Venezuela in the nineteenth century; upon returning, they brought with them the Spanish language and elements of South American culture.

According to the 2004 census conducted by Syria's Central Bureau of Statistics, Suwayda had a population of 73,641.

== History ==
=== Ancient and medieval eras ===
The city was founded by the Nabataeans as Suada. It became known as Dionysias Soada (Ancient Greek: Διονῡσιάς) in the Hellenistic period and the Roman Empire, for the god Dionysus, patron of wine – the city is situated in a famous ancient wine-producing region.

The name Dionysias replaced the former Nabataean name in 149 AD after Nabataean influence decreased and then concentrated towards the south, as a result of the then accelerating Hellenization of Coele-Syria.

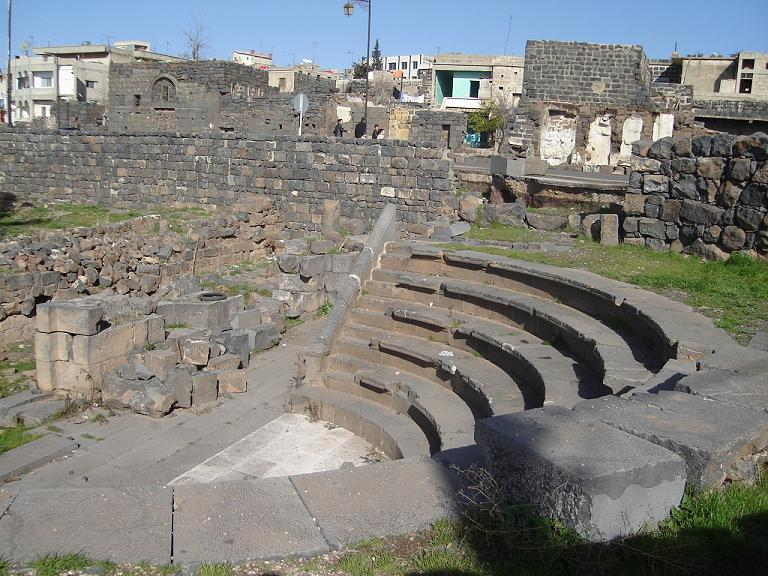
The agora of Dionysias

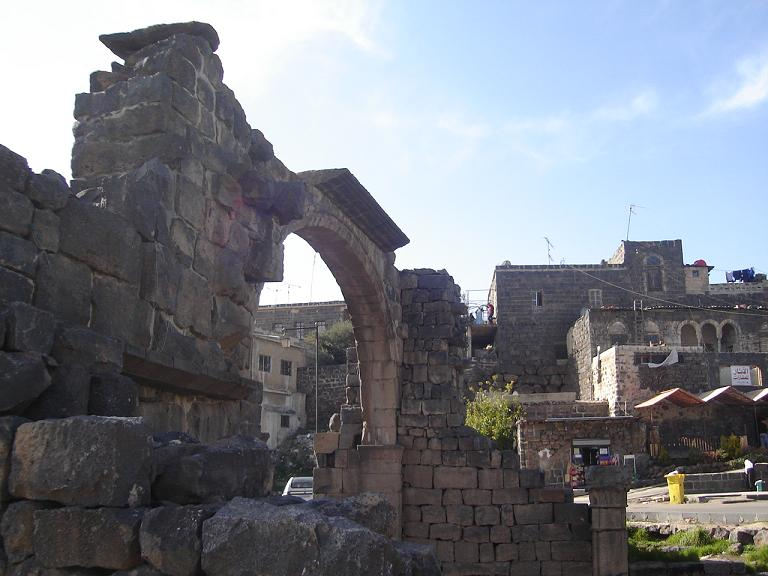
The arch of the lesser church

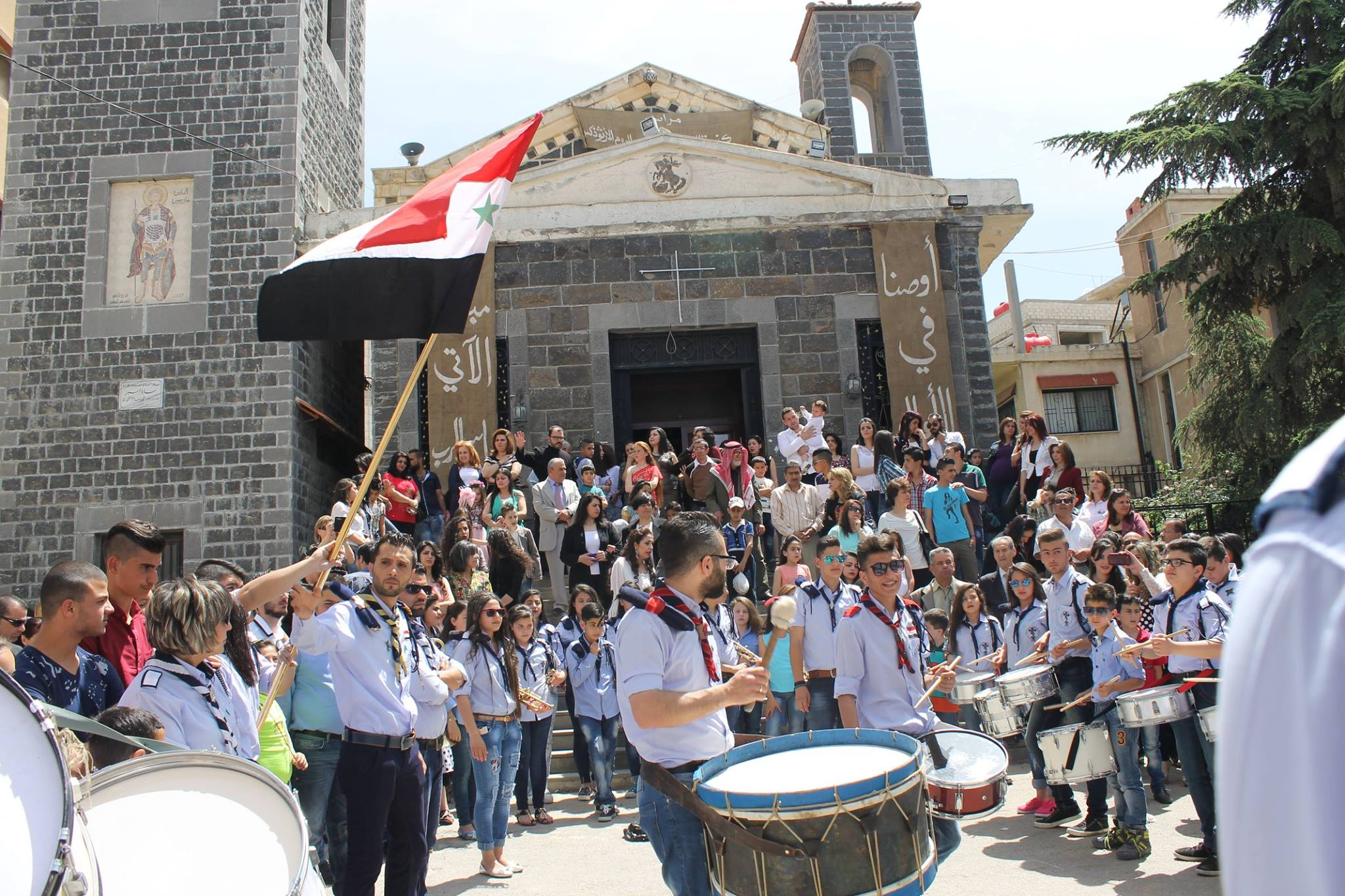
Orthodox Easter celebrations in As-Suwayda

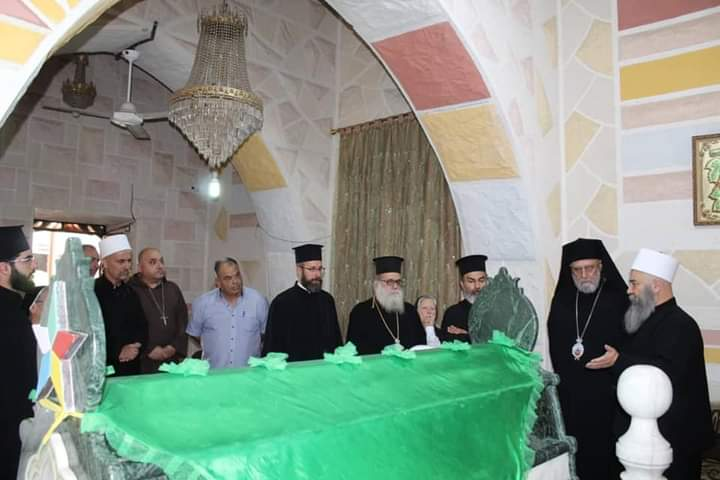
Druze and Christian clerics in Suwayda.

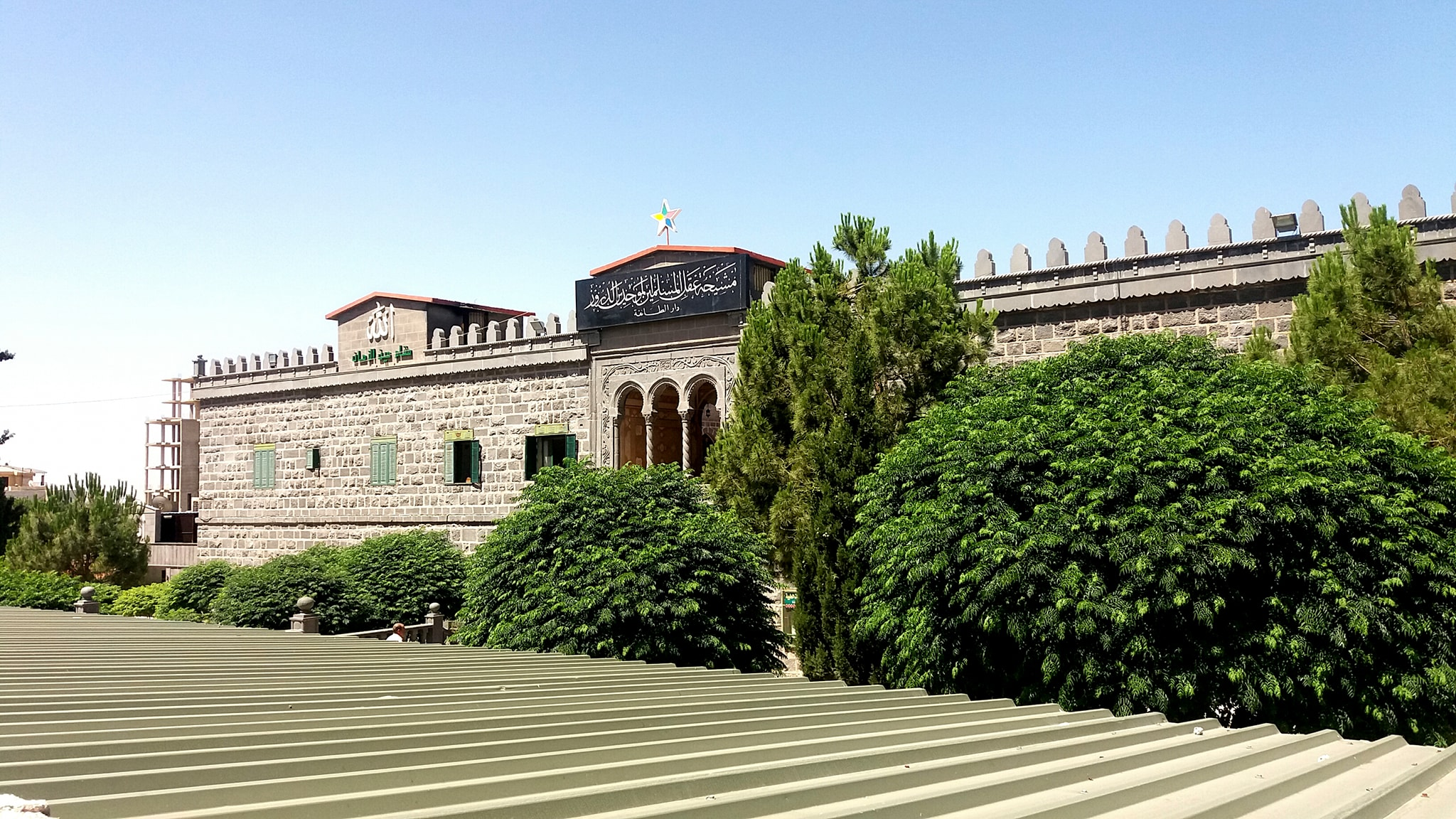
Maqam Ain az-Zaman (Druze Shrine)

Dionysias was a part of the Roman province of Arabia Petraea, and received the rights of civitas during the reign of Commodus between 180 and 185.

Dionysus was worshipped in the same Nabatean temple dedicated to Dushara. This practice of associating the worship of local and Hellenic gods was common in Hellenistic Syria.

This name remained in use during the Byzantine Empire, when the town was under the influence of the Ghassanids. Dionysias then was a diocese with a suffragan bishop from Bosra. It was mentioned in the Synecdemus of Hierocles. After the early Muslim conquests, the city was conquered by the Rashidun Caliphate of the Arabs in 629 and became a titular see.

Yaqut al-Hamawi noted in the 1220s that Suwayda was "a village of the Hauran Province".

=== Ottoman era ===
In 1516, the city and the adjoining region was conquered from the Mamluk Sultanate by the Ottoman Empire. In 1596 Suwayda appeared under the name of Majdal Sawda in the Ottoman tax registers as part of the nahiya (subdistrict) of Bani Nasiyya of the Hauran Sanjak. It had a population of 5 households and 5 bachelors, all Muslim. The villagers paid a fixed tax rate of 20% on various agricultural products, including wheat, barley, summer crops, goats and/or beehives, in addition to "occasional revenues"; a total of 6,125 akçe. 3/4 of the revenue went to a waqf.

In the late 17th and/or early 18th centuries, Druze from Mount Lebanon and other parts of greater Syria migrated in significant numbers to the Jabal Hauran, which was subsequently referred to as Jabal al-Druze ('the Druze Mountain'). The Jabal Hauran was full of deserted and ruined but once-prosperous and naturally defensible ancient villages which were utilized by the Druze newcomers. Initial settlement was concentrated in the northwestern area of the mountain due to the proximity to Druze villages on Mount Hermon. Settlement radiated across Jabal Hauran and Suwayda was among the villages settled by the Druze before 1812. By at least 1860, Suwayda had become the main Druze settlement in the region.

In the 19th century, Dionysias was identified as Suwayda by French statesman and antiquarian William Waddington. Visitors recorded the now-destroyed Tomb of Hamrath, an elaborate late Hellenistic mausoleum dating from the 1st century BCE.

=== Civil war (2011–present) ===
On 28 October 2012, security forces launched a campaign of mass arrests in the city.

==== 2018 Suwayda attacks ====
On 25 July 2018, the city was rocked by a string of terrorist attacks. A group of at least 56 ISIS-affiliated attackers entered the city and initiated a series of gunfights and suicide bombings killing 246 people, the vast majority of them civilians. Many of the terrorists were reported killed during the attack, bringing the total death toll to at least 302 people. Forty-two Druze residents between the ages of 7 and 60 were kidnapped by ISIS and held captive. One was executed bringing the total in captivity to 41.

==== Protests ====
On 7 June 2020, anti-government protests erupted in the city due to the deteriorating economic situation. Protesters demanded the resignation of President Bashar al-Assad for the first time since 2015. As a result of the protests, Prime Minister Imad Khamis was sacked on 11 June and replaced by Hussein Arnous.

In February 2022, hundreds of protesters took to the streets in Suwayda to decry corruption and worsening living standards.

In August 2023, thousands of protestors took to the streets to decry worsening economic conditions and demanding the departure of Syrian President Bashar al Assad.

==== Southern Syria offensive ====
During the Southern Syria offensive, Suwayda was captured by the Syrian opposition on 7 December 2024. On 18 December 2024, a delegation of the Syrian transitional government arrived at the city to meet with the spiritual leader of the Druze.

==== 2025 clashes ====
In July 2025, heavy fighting broke out between Druze and Bedouin in Suwayda, killing dozens. As of July 19, 2025 over 600 Druze were reported dead. The Syrian government deployed regular soldiers and Interior Ministry units there. According to Israeli officials, this was done to crack down on the Druze minority.

The Israel Defense Forces (IDF) attacked Syrian Armed Forces vehicles from the air and with URVs in order to prevent their arrival to the area. In a response, Prime Minister Benjamin Netanyahu and Defense Minister Israel Katz cited the need to protect the Druze religious minority due to their close ties to Israeli Druze as well as assuring the security of Israel's borders by preventing the deployment of weaponry and Syrian military forces in the area.

== Geography ==
=== Climate ===
Suwayda's climate is warm, dry and temperate, with no rainfall in the summer months.This location is classified as BSk by Köppen and Geiger. The average temperature is 15.5 °C. About 323 mm of precipitation falls annually.

Climate data for Suwayda, elevation 997 m (3,271 ft)
Month	Jan	Feb	Mar	Apr	May	Jun	Jul	Aug	Sep	Oct	Nov	Dec	Year
Mean daily maximum °C (°F)	11.1 (52.0)	12.1 (53.8)	15.1 (59.2)	20.2 (68.4)	25.6 (78.1)	29.5 (85.1)	30.6 (87.1)	31.2 (88.2)	29.5 (85.1)	25.8 (78.4)	19.7 (67.5)	13.3 (55.9)	22.0 (71.6)
Daily mean °C (°F)	7.0 (44.6)	7.8 (46.0)	10.3 (50.5)	14.3 (57.7)	18.5 (65.3)	21.7 (71.1)	23.0 (73.4)	23.5 (74.3)	21.8 (71.2)	19.2 (66.6)	14.6 (58.3)	9.1 (48.4)	15.9 (60.6)
Mean daily minimum °C (°F)	3.0 (37.4)	3.2 (37.8)	5.5 (41.9)	8.3 (46.9)	11.5 (52.7)	14.1 (57.4)	15.3 (59.5)	15.8 (60.4)	14.3 (57.7)	12.5 (54.5)	9.3 (48.7)	5.0 (41.0)	9.8 (49.7)
Average precipitation mm (inches)	78 (3.1)	82 (3.2)	68 (2.7)	28 (1.1)	8 (0.3)	0 (0)	0 (0)	0 (0)	2 (0.1)	9 (0.4)	30 (1.2)	59 (2.3)	364 (14.4)
Source: FAO

=== Neighbourhoods ===
Suwayda is divided into 10 neighbourhoods:

- Al-Wihda
- Al-Hurriyah
- Al-Nahdah
- Al-Shuhada
- Al-Fursan
- Al-Istiqlal
- Ath-Thawra
- Al-Jihad
- Al-Joulan
- Al-Mazraah

== Demographics ==
Historical population
Year	Pop.	±%
1981	43,414	—
2004	73,641	+69.6%

The city had a population of 73,641 in the 2004 census.

The inhabitants of the city are mainly Druze, with small Christian (mostly Greek Orthodox) and Sunni Muslim Bedouin minorities.

The Sunni Bedouins primarily reside on the northern and eastern outskirts of the city, in the areas of al-Maqwas, al-Haroubi, al-Mashoureb, Rajem az-Zaytoun, ad-Diyatha, and ash-Shaqrawiyah.

In 2011, the Melkite Greek Catholic Church had approximately 2,300 believers in Suwayda.

== Religious buildings ==
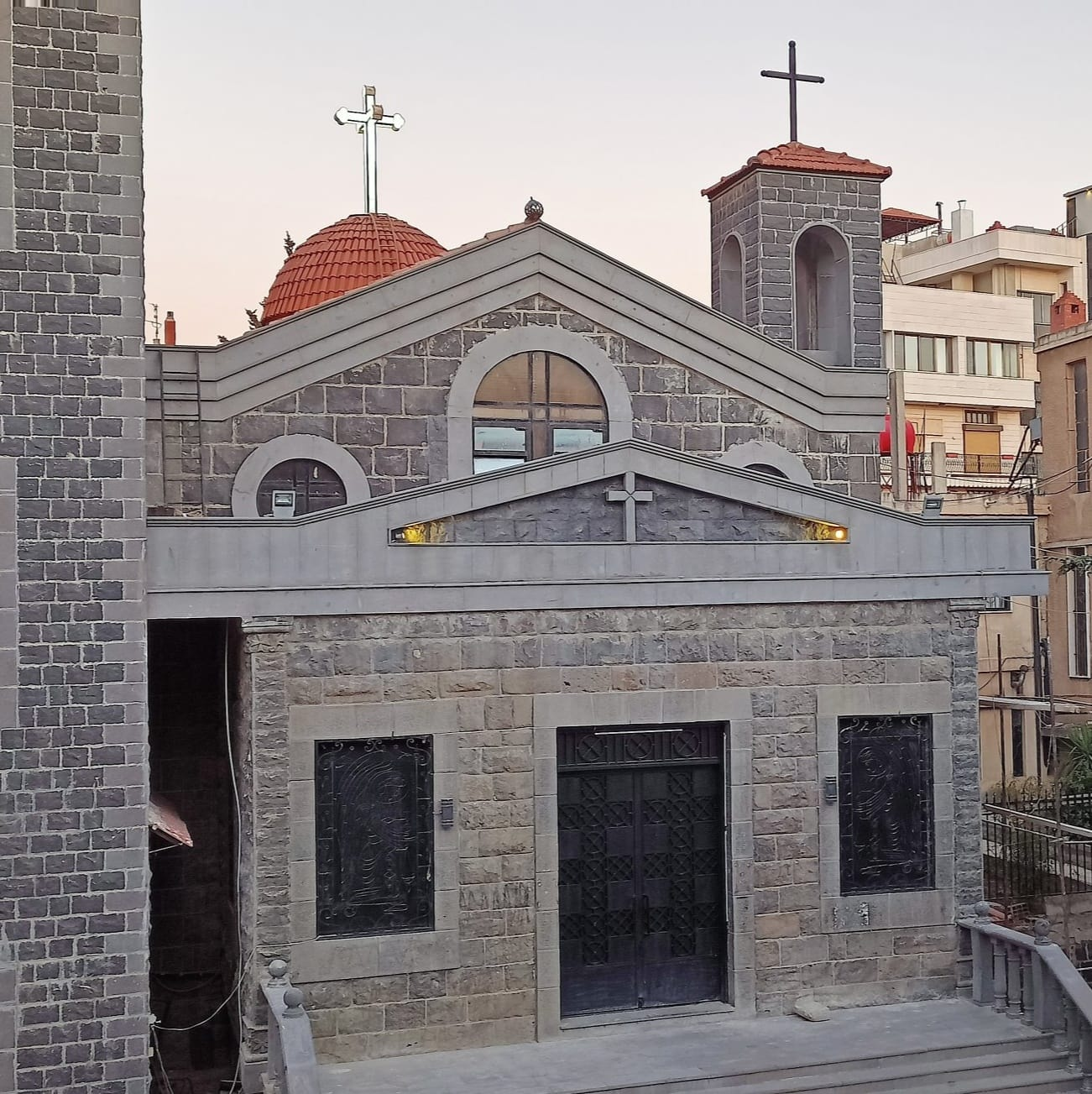
St. George Greek Orthodox Church

- St. George Greek Orthodox Church
- St. Timon Greek Orthodox Church (small church)
- Jesus the King (Capuchin Fathers) Melkite Greek Catholic Church
- Jesus Good Shepherd National Evangelical Christian Union Church
- Saints Constantine and Helena Greek Orthodox Shrine
- Grand Mosque
- Omar ibn al-Khattab Mosque
- Maqam Ain az-Zaman (Druze Shrine)
- Maqam Sheikh Othman (Druze Shrine)

== Archaeology ==
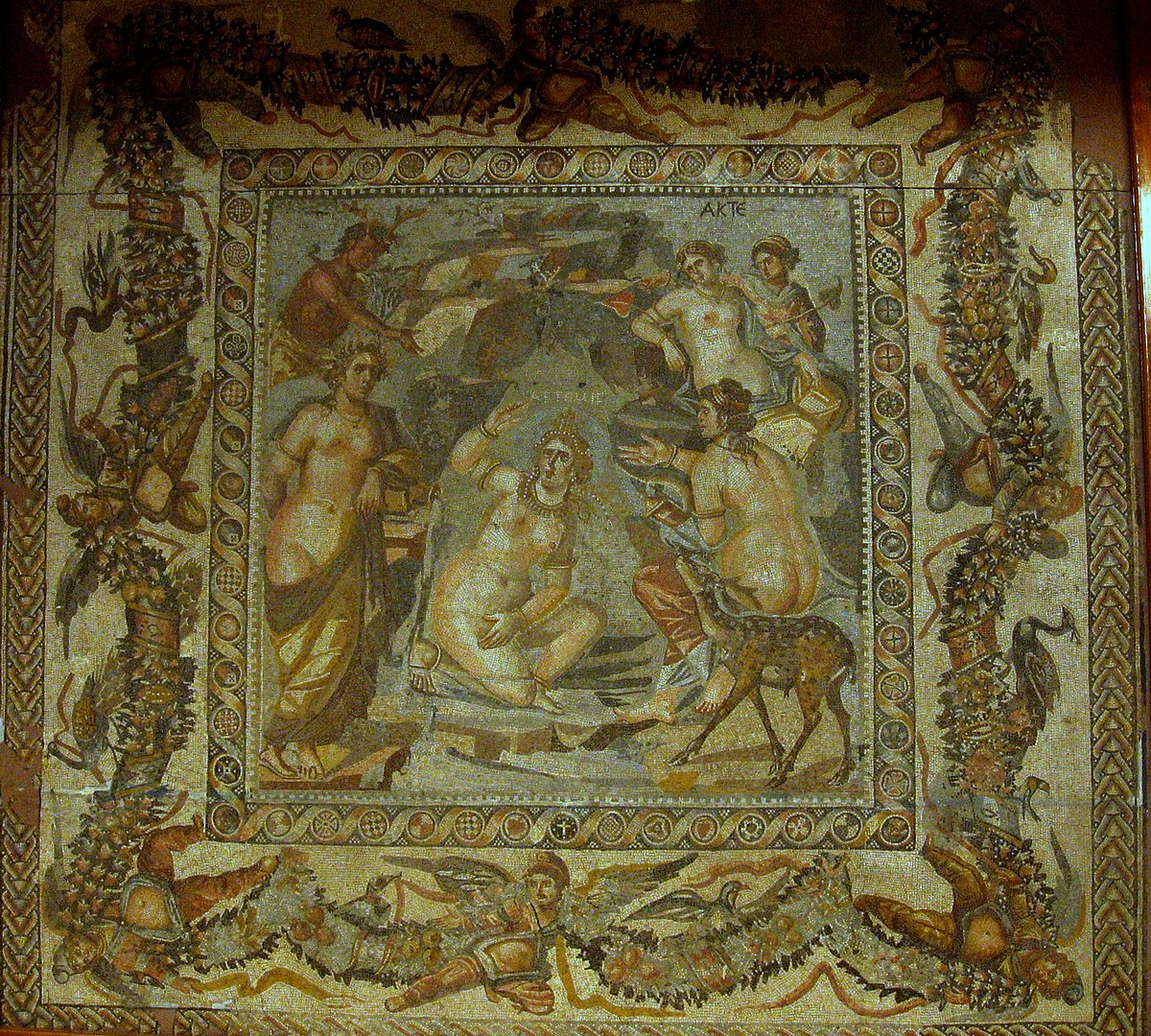
Diana discovered at bath by Actaeon; mosaic in Suwayda

Many archeological sites can be found in the old part of the city:

- Temple of Dionysus-Dushara: eight well-decorated columns are still standing from the temple.
- Saint Sergius Basilica: was built in the fifth century. It has Byzantine architectural elements, with an abbey surrounding it. The basilica was dedicated to Sergius.
- The arch of the lesser church: the church itself is ruined. An arch is still standing there known locally as "The Gallows" (Arabic: المشنقة al-Mashnaqah) with grape motif decorations.
- The theater: was recently discovered, south of the Agora.

The city has many ancient reservoirs, towers and old Roman houses that are still inhabited by locals today.

Many parts of the old city still await excavation, such as the Roman aqueduct, a conical reservoir, and a larger Roman theatre. There is also an old 7th century mosque built during the time of the Rashidun Caliphate.

== Notable people ==
- Asmahan, singer
- Fahd Ballan, singer, actor
- Najat Abdul Samad, writer, translator and obstetrician

== See also ==
- Druze in Syria
- Christians in Syria
- Suwayda National Museum

== Bibliography ==
- Firro, Kais (1992). A History of the Druzes. BRILL. ISBN 9004094377.
- Hütteroth, W.-D.; Abdulfattah, K. (1977). Historical Geography of Palestine, Transjordan and Southern Syria in the Late 16th Century. Erlanger Geographische Arbeiten, Sonderband 5. Erlangen, Germany: Vorstand der Fränkischen Geographischen Gesellschaft. ISBN 3-920405-41-2.
- Le Strange, G. (1890). Palestine Under the Moslems: A Description of Syria and the Holy Land from A.D. 650 to 1500. Committee of the Palestine Exploration Fund.
