= Suwayda Governorate =

Syrian province

Suwayda Governorate مُحافظة السويداء
- Governorate
- Ancient Basilica in Qanawat

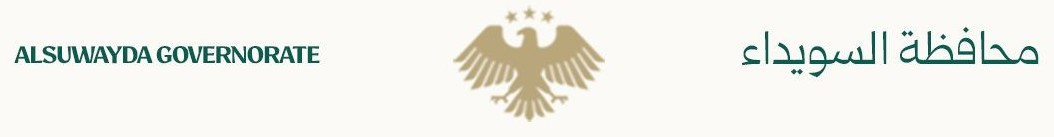
- Seal

- Map of Syria with Suwayda Governorate highlighted
- Interactive map of Suwayda Governorate
- Coordinates (Suwayda): 32.8°N 36.8°E
- Country: Syria
- Control: Administrative Council of Jabal Bashan (de facto) (Syrian opposition) Syrian transitional government (de jure, west and furthest east areas only)
- Capital: Suwayda
- Manatiq (Districts): 3

Government
  - Governor: Mustafa al-Bakour
  - Head of the Suwayda Governorate Council: Muhsina al-Mahithawi
  - Commander of the Internal Security Forces for Suwayda Province: Hussam al-Tahhan

Area
  - Total: 5,550 km^{2} (2,140 sq mi)

Population (2025)
  - Total: 1,035,000
  - Density: 186/km^{2} (483/sq mi)
- Time zone: UTC+3 (AST)
- ISO 3166 code: SY-SU
- Main language(s): Arabic

Suwayda Governorate (Arabic: مُحافظة السويداء, romanized: Muḥāfaẓat as-Suwaydāʾ) is one of the fourteen governorates (provinces) of Syria. It is the country's southernmost governorate, covering an area of 5,550 km^{2}, and is bordered by Daraa Governorate in the west, Rif Dimashq Governorate in the north and northeast, and the country of Jordan in the south and southeast. The capital and largest city of the governorate is Suwayda.

Geographically the governorate comprises almost all of Jabal al-Druze, the eastern part of Lajat, and a part of the arid eastern steppe of Harrat al-Sham. Both Suwayda and Daraa governorates are part of the historic Hauran region.

Most inhabitants of Suwayda are employed in agriculture, cultivating crops such as grapes, apples, olives, and wheat. Additionally, Suwayda is home to numerous archaeological sites.

The governorate had a population of 313,231 in the 2004 census.

This governorate is unique in Syria as it has a Druze majority. Additionally, it has integrated Christian communities that have long coexisted harmoniously with the Druze in mountains and a Sunni Muslim Bedouin minority.

== Geography ==
=== Districts ===

The governorate is divided into three districts (manatiq). The districts are further divided into 12 sub-districts (nawahi):

- Suwayda District (3 sub-districts)
  - Suwayda Subdistrict
  - Al-Mazraa Subdistrict
  - Al-Mushannaf Subdistrict
- Salkhad District (5 sub-districts)
  - Salkhad Subdistrict
  - Al-Qurayya Subdistrict
  - Al-Ghariyah Subdistrict
  - Dhibin Subdistrict
  - Malah Subdistrict
- Shahba District (4 sub-districts)
  - Shahba Subdistrict
  - Shaqqa Subdistrict
  - Al-Ariqah Subdistrict
  - As-Sawra as-Saghira Subdistrict

=== Cities, towns and villages ===
This list includes all cities, towns and villages with more than 5,000 inhabitants. Based on the 2004 census, the Suwayda Governorate was populated by 133 localities. The population figures are given according to the 2004 official census:

English name	Population	District
Suwayda	73,641	Suwayda District
Shahba	13,660	Shahba District
Salkhad	9,155	Salkhad District
Qanawat	8,324	Suwayda District
Al-Kafr	7,458	Suwayda District
Al-Qurayya	6,789	Salkhad District
Ira	6,136	Suwayda District
Urman	5,735	Salkhad District
Ar-Raha	5,711	Suwayda District
Shaqqa	5,116	Shahba District

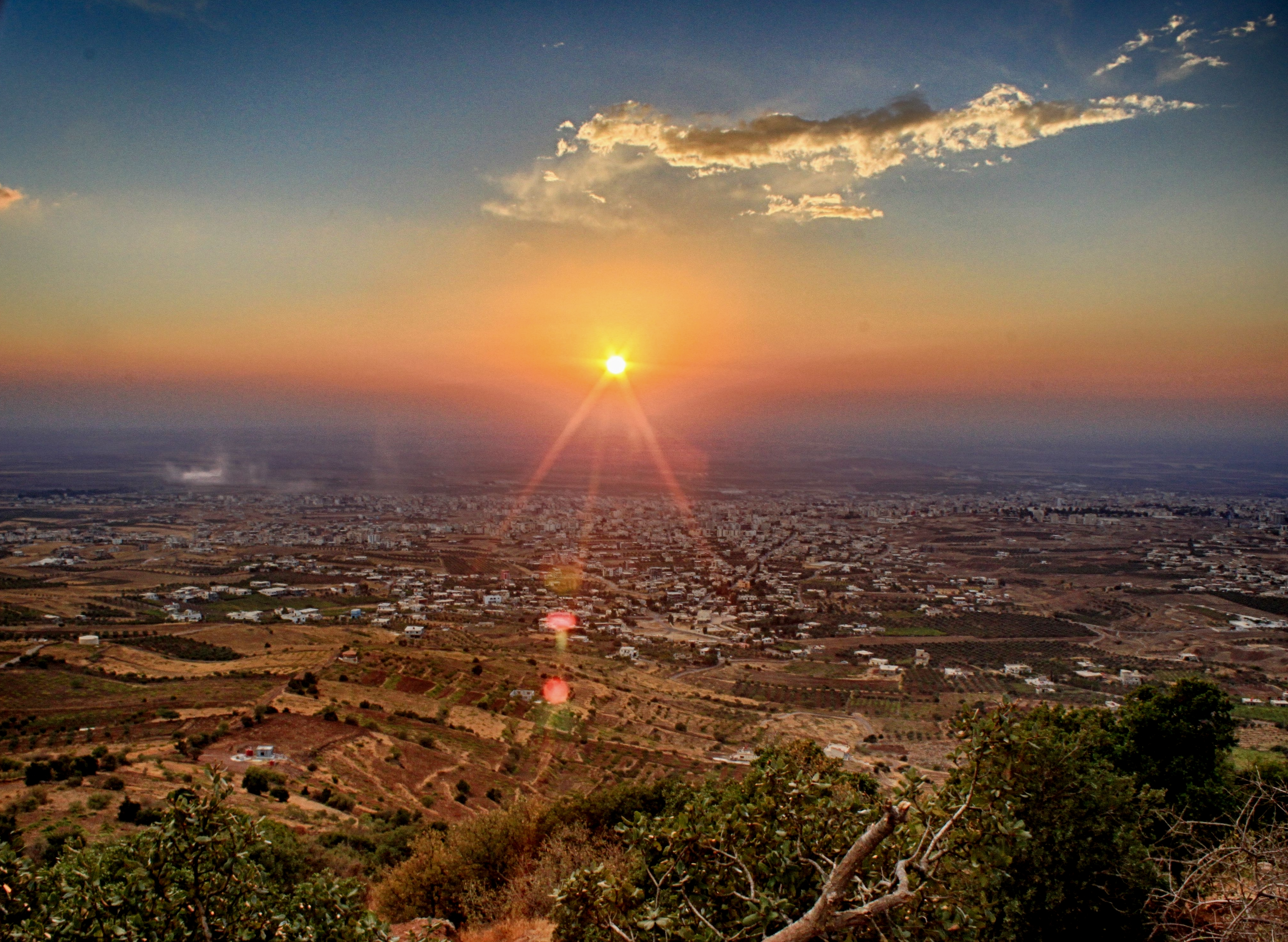
Suwayda's City aerial view October 2011

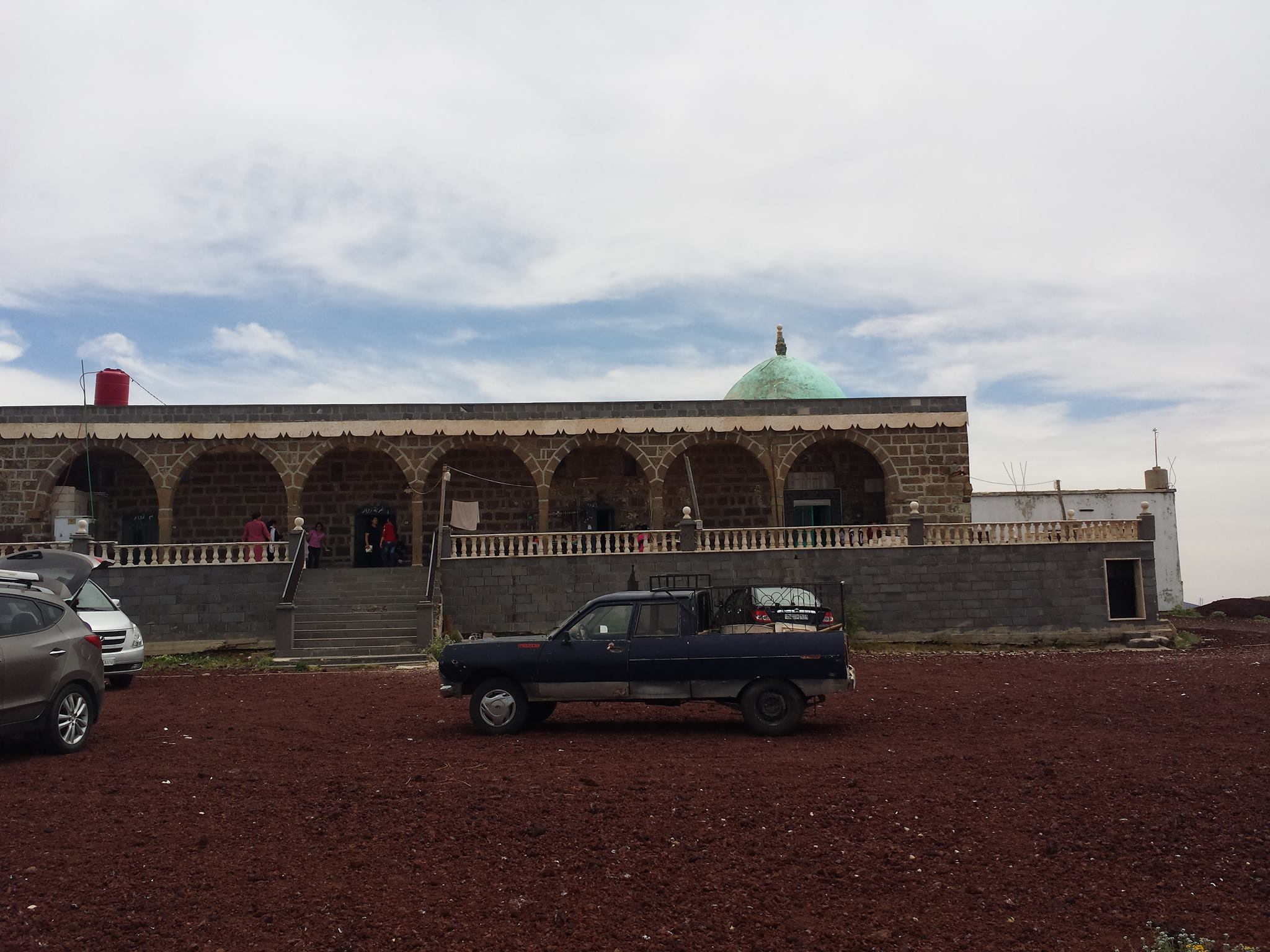
Druze shrine on top of Jabal al-Druze

The governorate contains 3 cities, 124 towns/villages, and 36 hamlets.

=== Cities ===
- Suwayda
- Shahba
- Salkhad

=== Towns ===
- Al-Ariqah
- Dhibin
- Al-Ghariyah
- Malah
- Al-Mazraa
- Al-Mushannaf
- Al-Qurayya
- As-Sawra as-Saghira
- Shaqqa

== Demographics ==
Religious composition of Suwayda Governorate (2010)
Druze	90%
Christians	7%
Sunni Muslims	3%

Historical population
Year	Pop.	±%
2010	375,000	—
2018	500,000	+33.3%

The governorate has a population of about 375,000 inhabitants (est. 2010). It is the only governorate in Syria that has a Druze majority. This is due to the large scale migration of the Druze from Lebanon (and to a lesser extent, the Galilee) from the mid-19th through the early 20th century. There is also a sizable Greek Orthodox minority, and a small Sunni Muslim Bedouin community. During the civil war, many Sunni Muslim refugees—mainly from Daraa Governorate as well as other parts of Syria—found refuge in Suwayda.

In the 1980s Druze made up 87.6% of the population, Christians (mostly Greek Orthodox) 11% and Sunni Muslims 2%. In 2010, the As-Suwayda governorate has a population of about 375,000 inhabitants, Druze made up 90%, Christians 7% and Sunni Muslims 3%. Due to low birth and high emigration rates, Christians proportion in Suwayda had declined.

Most of the inhabitants live in the western parts of the governorate, especially on the western slopes of Jabal al-Druze. Only nomadic Bedouin tribes live in the barren region of Harrat al-Shamah.

== Government ==
The Druze majority government has leaned towards a semi-independent status, rejecting central Syrian government for much of its history. During the Assad period, the Suwayda Government was largely free of serious conflict. However, there was regular passive resistance to Assad's rule, including constant public protests. Also, citizens closed the Ba'ath Party offices and removed pro-Assad posters in public, though there was never escalation to armed revolution.

Despite the end of the Assad regime, attacks on minorities, in particular Druze peoples, have similarly shaken confidence in the post-Assad government.

== See also ==
- Druze in Syria
- Christianity in Syria
- Jabal Druze State (1921-1936)
