= Druze in Syria =

Druze community in Syria

Syrian Druze people
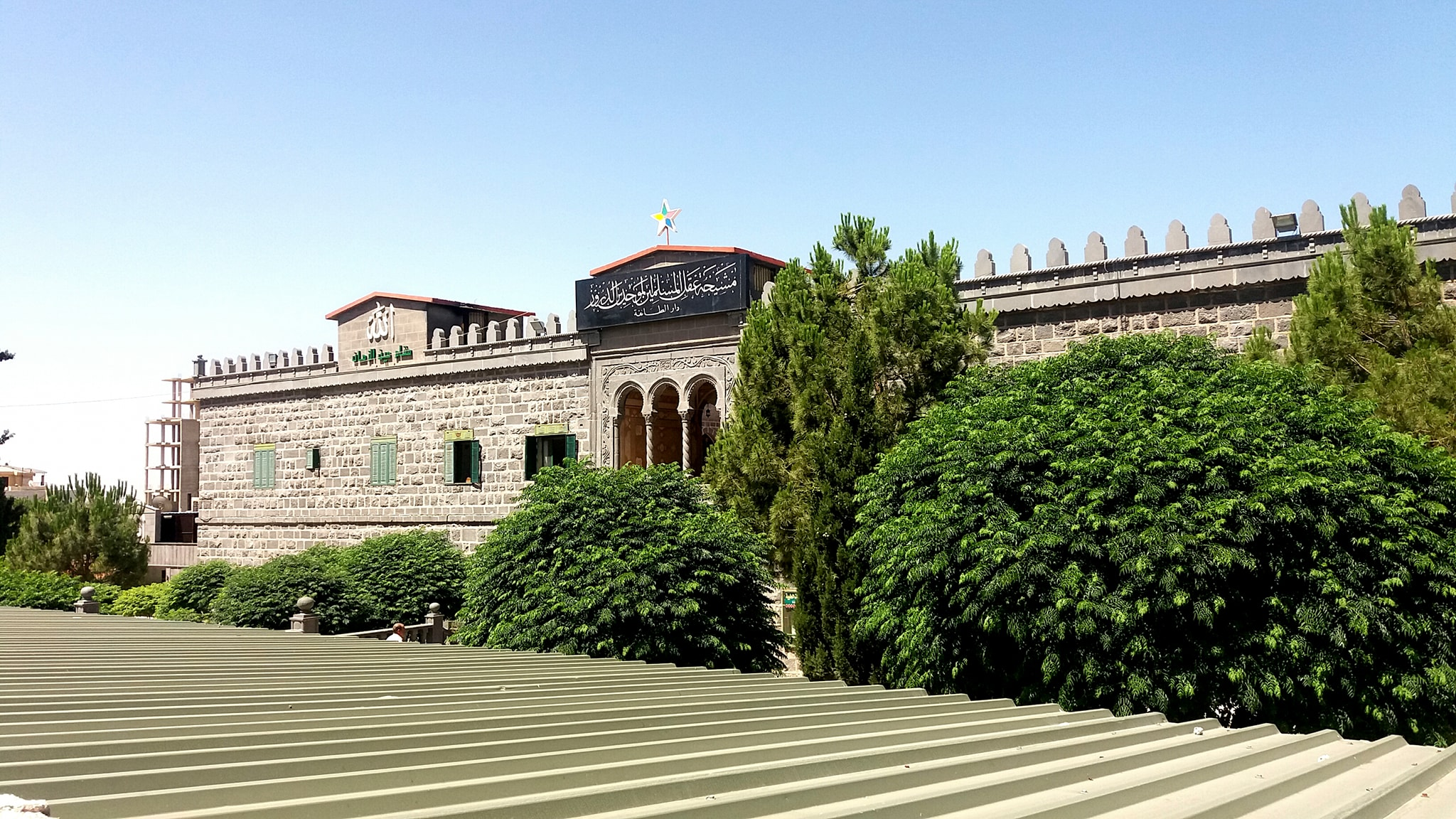
- Maqam Ain al-Zaman: The headquarters of the Druze community in Syria

Total population
- 700,000

Languages
- Arabic

Religion
- Druze

The Druze faith is the third-largest religion in Syria with 2010 results recording that their adherents made up 3.2 percent of the population. The Druze are concentrated in the rural, mountainous areas east and south of Damascus in the area of Jabal al-Druze.

The Druze faith is a monotheistic and Abrahamic religion. Syria has the largest Druze population in the world. Many Syrian Druze have been living abroad for centuries, particularly in Venezuela.

== History ==
The Druze faith is an Abrahamic monotheistic religion that is a gnostic offshoot and Neoplatonist sect of Isma'ilism, a branch of Shia Islam. The Druze evolved from Islam and now are an independent religion.

Historically, the relationship between the Druze and Muslims has been characterized by intense persecution of the Druze. The Druze faith is often classified as a branch of Isma'ili. Even though the faith originally developed out of Ismaili Islam, most Druze do not identify as Muslims. The Druze follow a batini or esoteric interpretation of the Five Pillars of Islam: thus, they do not accept fasting during the month of Ramadan, making a pilgrimage to Mecca, or accepting Muhammad as a prophet of God. The Druze have experienced persecution under different Muslim regimes such as the Shia Fatimid Caliphate, Sunni Ayyubid Sultanate, Mamluk Sultanate, Ottoman Empire, and Egypt Eyalet. Persecution of the Druze included massacres, demolishing Druze prayer houses and holy places and forced conversion to Islam. According to the Druze narrative, this was an attempt to eradicate the whole community. Since they do not fast during the month of Ramadan or make pilgrimages to Mecca, they are not regarded by Muslims as Islamic.

The Druze follow a lifestyle of isolation where no conversion is allowed, neither out of nor into, the religion. When Druze live among people of other religions, they try to blend in, in order to protect their religion and their own safety. They can pray as Muslims, or as Christians, depending on where they are. This system is apparently changing in modern times, where more security has allowed Druze to be more open about their religious belonging.

The Tanukhids inaugurated the Druze community in Syria when most of them accepted and adopted the new message that was being preached in the 11th century, due to their leadership's close ties with Fatimid caliph al-Hakim bi-Amr Allah.

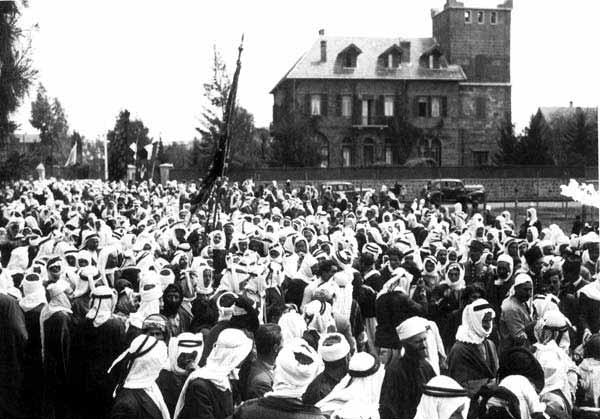
Druze warriors preparing to go to battle with Sultan al-Atrash, 1925

In Syria, most Druze live in the Jabal al-Druze, a rugged and mountainous region in the southwest of the country which is more than 90 percent Druze; some 120 villages are exclusively Druze. The Yaman were defeated by the Qays at the Battle of Ain Dara in Lebanon, which led to the Druze settling in the area. Other notable communities live in the Harim Mountains, the Damascus suburb of Jaramana, and on the southeast slopes of Mount Hermon. A large Syrian Druze community historically lived in the Golan Heights, but following wars with Israel in 1967 and 1973, many fled to other parts of Syria; most of those who remained live in a handful of villages in the disputed zone. Only a few live in the narrow remnant of Quneitra Governorate that is still under effective Syrian control.

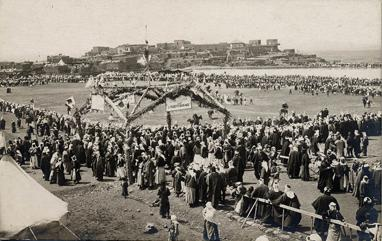
Druze celebrating their independence in 1925.

The Druze always played a far more important role in Syrian politics than its comparatively small population would suggest. With a community of little more than 100,000 in 1949 or roughly three percent of the Syrian population, the Druze of Syria's southwestern mountains constituted a potent force in Syrian politics and played a leading role in the nationalist struggle against the French. Under the military leadership of Sultan al-Atrash, the Druze provided much of the military force behind the Great Syrian Revolt of 1925–27. In 1945, Amir Hasan al-Atrash, the paramount political leader of the Jabal Druze State, led the Druze military units in a successful revolt against the French, making the Jebel al-Druze the first and only region in Syria to liberate itself from French rule without British assistance. At independence, the Druze expected to be rewarded for their sacrifices on the battlefield. They demanded to keep their autonomous administration and many political privileges accorded them by the French and sought generous economic assistance from the newly independent government.

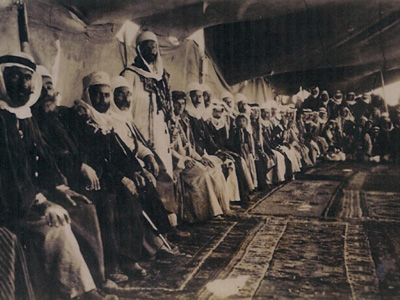
Druze leaders meeting in Jabal al-Druze, Syria, 1926

When a local paper in 1945 reported that President Shukri al-Quwatli (1943–49) had called the Druzes a "dangerous minority", Sultan Pasha al-Atrash flew into a rage and demanded a public retraction. He threatened that the Druzes would indeed become dangerous and a force of 4,000 Druze warriors would occupy Damascus. The military balance of power in Syria was tilted in favor of the Druzes at that time. In 1946, an advisor to the Syrian Defense Department described the Syrian army as "useless", and said the Druzes could "take Damascus and capture the present leaders in a breeze."

During the four years of Adib Shishakli's rule in Syria (December 1949 to February 1954) (on 25 August 1952: Shishakli created the Arab Liberation Movement (ALM), a progressive party with pan-Arabist and socialist views), the Druze community was subjected to a heavy attack by the Syrian government. Shishakli believed that among his many opponents in Syria, the Druzes were the most potentially dangerous, and he was determined to crush them. He frequently proclaimed: "My enemies are like a serpent: the head is the Jebel al-Druze, the stomach Homs, and the tail Aleppo. If I crush the head the serpent will die." Shishakli dispatched 10,000 regular troops to occupy the Jebel al-Druze. Several towns were bombarded with heavy weapons, killing scores of civilians and destroying many houses. According to Druze accounts, Shishakli encouraged neighboring Bedouin tribes to plunder the defenseless population and allowed his own troops to run amok.

Shishakli launched a campaign to defame the Druzes for their religion and politics. He accused the entire community of treason, at times claiming they were agents of the British and Hashemites, at others that they were fighting for Israel against the Arabs. He even produced a cache of Israeli weapons allegedly discovered in the Jabal. Even more painful for the Druze community was his publication of "falsified Druze religious texts" and false testimonials ascribed to leading Druze sheikhs designed to stir up sectarian hatred. This propaganda also was broadcast in the Arab world, mainly Egypt. Shishakli was assassinated in Brazil on 27 September 1964 by a Druze seeking revenge for Shishakli's bombardment of the Jebel al-Druze.

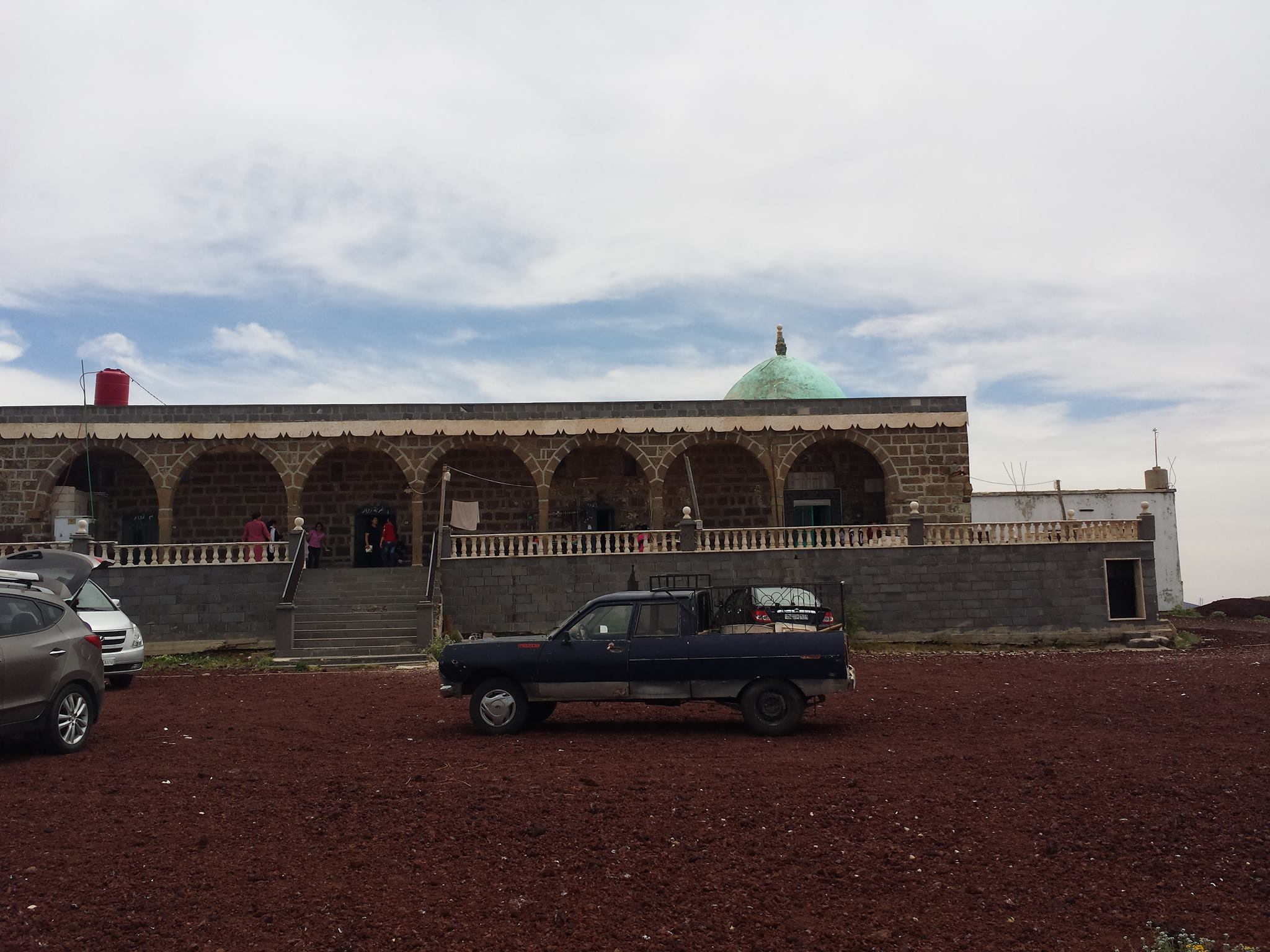
Maqam al-Masih (Jesus) in As-Suwayda Governorate.

He forcibly integrated minorities into the national Syrian social structure; his "Syrianization" of Alawi and Druze territories had to be accomplished in part using violence. To this end, al-Shishakli encouraged the stigmatization of minorities. He saw minority demands as tantamount to treason. His increasingly chauvinistic notions of Arab nationalism were predicated on the denial that "minorities" existed in Syria.

After the Shishakli's military campaign, the Druze community lost a lot of its political influence, but many Druze military officers played an important role when it came to the Ba'ath government previously ruling Syria.

In 1967, a community of Druze in the Golan Heights came under Israeli control, today about 150,000 strong.

=== Syrian civil war ===
The Qalb Loze massacre was a reported massacre of 20–24 Syrian Druze on 10 June 2015 in the village of Qalb Loze in Syria's northwestern Idlib Governorate.

On 25 July 2018, a group of Islamic State-affiliated attackers entered the Druze city of as-Suwayda and initiated a series of gunfights and suicide bombings on its streets killing at least 258 people, the vast majority of them civilians.

==== Fall of the Assad regime ====
VOA report from January 2025 about Druze sentiments right after the fall of Assad

Following the fall of the Assad regime, news were shared on social media to claim that the Druze population living in Hader, Quneitra Governorate of wishing to be under Israeli rule. This information, based on a non-verified video showing one individual expressing his opinion in a public gathering, has been repeated by mainstream media. The local leaders recorded a collective announcement on December 13, 2024, to deny these allegations and to denounce the Israeli occupation of their village. Syrian Druze leader Sheikh Hikmat al-Hijri denounced the Israeli invasion of Syria, stressing the need to maintain support for Syria's "social and territorial unity".

In December 2024, the Druze formed the Suwayda Military Council (SMC) in response to growing security concerns after the fall of the Assad regime.

On 14 March 2025, a hundred Druze sheikhs arrived from Syria to Israel for a historic visit to a Druze prophet's shrine.

In late March, Syrian Druze cleric Youssef Jarbou stated that the Druze community shares a "harmonic" relationship with the Kurdish-led Rojava. This includes a "significant alignment" of "demands and efforts", and that the Druze and Kurdish communities have a "shared political vision, particularly regarding Syria’s future". He also believed that the 2025 Interim Constitution drafted by the Syrian caretaker government "does not rise up to the aspirations of the Syrian people", and that he sees the newly-established transitional government as "monopolized by one group" and creates fears for a "non-participatory state".

==== Conflict with the Syrian transitional government ====
Between late April and early May 2025, there were violent clashes between local Druze communities and Syrian government forces in parts of southern Syria.

On 11 July 2025, new a series of clashes between Bedouin and Druze of armed groups began in the Suwayda governate. According to the UK-based Syrian Observatory for Human Rights, more than 1,120 Druze were killed in the clash, 194 of whom were "executed" by "defence and interior ministry personnel." That same non-governmental monitor reported that 354 government security personnel and 21 Sunni Bedouin were killed in the conflict, with three executed by Druze fighters, and an additional 15 government troops killed by Israeli airstrikes. According to the United Nations migration agency, 128,000 people were displace by the conflict. Videos shared on social media, as well as reports to and documented by the Office of the United Nations High Commissioner for Human Rights and BBC News, showed violence committed against civilian Druze population from the government, as well as from Bedouin forces, including unarmed civilians being shot and houses being torched. Following these, the Syrian Armed Forces and the General Security Service were dispatched to the region. The Israeli Airforce was also reported in the area during the conflict. On July 15 and 16 agreements on the integration of the Suwayda governate into the Syrian state were announced. Following further clashes between Syrian Government forces and Druze, as well as Israeli Airstrikes in Damascus, a withdrawal of the Syrian Armed Forces from the region was announced.

On 23 August 2025, following the conflict with the Syrian transitional government, multiple Druze factions under Hikmat al-Hijri formed the National Guard of Suwayda to coordinate military and security efforts in the governorate.

== Demographics ==
According to scholar Colbert C. Held of University of Nebraska–Lincoln, the number of Druze people worldwide is around one million, with about 45% to 50% living in Syria, 35% to 40% living in Lebanon, and less than 10% living in Israel; recently there has been a growing Druze diaspora. The Syrian Druze are Arabic in language and culture, and their mother tongue is Arabic. The Druze Arabic dialect, especially in the rural areas, is often different from the other regional Syrian Arabic dialects. Druze Arabic dialect is distinguished from others by retention of the phoneme /qāf/. The use of /q/ by Druze is particularly prominent in the mountains and less so in urban areas.

The Druze are concentrated in the rural, mountainous areas east and south of Damascus in the area known officially as Jabal al-Druze. The Syrian Druze are estimated to constitute 3.2% of Syria's population of approximately 23 million, which means they amount to between 700 and 736 thousand people.

Before the Syrian civil war, it's been estimated that around 700,000 Druze were living in Syria in 2010, or around 3% of the Syrian population. Around 337,500 Druze lived in As-Suwayda Governorate (or 48.2% of total Syrian Druze), the only governorate in Syria that has a Druze majority (around 90%). While 250,000 Druze (or 35.7%) lived in Damascus and its outskirts (such as Jaramana, Sahnaya, and Jdeidat Artouz), and around 30,000 Druze lived in the east side of Mount Hermon, and around 25,000 Druze lived in 14 villages in Jabal al-Summaq in Idlib Governorate.

There are many Syrian Druze also living abroad, particularly in Latin America, who have been living there for over the past hundred years. In Venezuela, there are approximately 60,000 Druze of Syrian origin.

By one estimate made by Elisabet Granli from University of Oslo, around 1,920 Syrian Druze converted to Christianity; according to the same study, Druze converts to Christianity still regard themselves as Druze, and they claim that there is no contradiction between being Druze and being Christian.

== Notable people ==
- Most prominent Druze families in Syria are: al-Atrash and Al Hamdan.

=== Politicians ===
- Sultan al-Atrash
- Hilal al-Atrash, Minister of local administration and environment (2000–2009)
- Mansur al-Atrash, Minister of Labor and Social Affairs (1963–1964)
- Shibli al-Aysami, Vice President of Syria (1965–1966)
- Salim Hatum
- Muhsina al-Mahithawi, Governor of Suwayda (2024–present)
- Amjad Badr, Minister for Agriculture and Agrarian Reform (2025–present)

=== Singers ===
- Asmahan
- Farid al-Atrash
- Fahd Ballan

=== Actors ===
- Naji Jaber
- Lilia al-Atrash
- Marah Jaber
- Leila Jaber
- Jumana Murad
- Adham Morshed
- Khaled Al Qeesh
- Rafi Wahbi
- Ghazwan Safadi

=== Sports ===
- Raja Rafe

=== Miscellaneous ===
- Faisal al-Qassem, Talk show host
- Nawaf Ghazaleh
- Issam Zahreddine, military officer
- Luna al-Shibl, Al Jazeera anchorwoman, adviser to Syrian president Bashar al-Assad (died in July 2024)
- Hassan Al Kontar, Syrian refugee

== See also ==
- Jabal al-Druze
- Druze
- Islam in Syria
- Religion in Syria
- Jabal Druze State
- Jaysh al-Muwahhideen
