= Hauran =

Region in Syria and Jordan

Map of the Hauran region

The Hauran (Arabic: حَوْرَان, romanized: Ḥawrān; also spelled Hawran or Houran) is a region that spans parts of southern Syria and northern Jordan. It is bound in the north by the Ghouta oasis, to the northeast by the al-Safa field, to the east and south by the Harrat al-Sham and to the west by the Golan Heights. Traditionally, the Hauran consists of three subregions: the Nuqrah and Jaydur plains, the Jabal al-Druze massif, and the Lajat volcanic field. The population of the Hauran is largely Arab, but religiously heterogeneous; most inhabitants of the plains are Sunni Muslims belonging to large agrarian clans, while Druze form the majority in the eponymous Jabal al-Druze and a significant Greek Orthodox and Greek Catholic minority inhabit the western foothills of Jabal al-Druze. The region's largest towns are Daraa, Ramtha, and Suwayda.

From the mid-1st century BC, the region was governed by the Roman Empire's Herodian and Nabatean client kings until it was formally annexed by the empire in the 2nd century AD. The Hauran prospered under Roman rule (106–395 AD) and its villages functioned as largely self-governing units, some of which developed into imperial cities. The region continued to prosper in the Byzantine era (395–634), during which different Arab tribes ruled the Hauran on Byzantium's behalf, including the Salihids (5th century) and Ghassanids (6th century) until the Muslim conquest in the mid-630s. For much of the Islamic era until Ottoman rule (1517–1917), the Hauran was divided into the districts of al-Bathaniyya and Ḥawrān, which corresponded to the Classical Batanea and Auranitis. Medieval Muslim geographers variously described these districts as prosperous, well-watered and well-populated.

Under the Romans, the grain of Batanea and the wine of Auranitis were important for imperial trade, and throughout its history, the Hauran was the major source of the Levant's grain. The region saw a decline in the 17th century until increased demand for Syrian grain and improved security led to the agricultural revival and re-population of the Hauran in the mid-19th century. The region also historically benefited as a key transit area on the traditional Hajj caravan route to Mecca and later the Hejaz railway. The Hauran remained Syria's breadbasket until being largely supplanted by northern Syria in the mid-20th century, which coincided with its separation from interdependent areas due to international borders and the Arab–Israeli conflict. Nonetheless, it persisted as an important agricultural and commercial transit area into the 2000s. During the Syrian Civil War, which was sparked in the Hauran in 2011, it became a major conflict zone between rebels and government forces in the Daraa Governorate campaign until the government reasserted control in 2018, only to later fall into rebel hands after the Southern Syria offensive and the Fall of the Assad regime.

The wide availability of basalt in the Hauran led to the development of a distinct vernacular architecture characterized by the exclusive use of basalt as a building material and a fusion of Hellenistic, Nabatean and Roman styles. The durability of basalt is credited for the Hauran's possession of one of the highest concentrations of well-preserved Classical-era monuments in the world. Hauran towns such as Bosra, Qanawat, Shahba, Salkhad, Umm al-Jimal and numerous others contain Roman temples and theaters, Byzantine-era churches and monasteries, and forts, mosques and bathhouses built by successive Muslim dynasties.

== Geography ==
=== Geographic definition ===
The approximate boundaries of the Hauran

Though its geographic definition may vary, the Hauran generally consists of the following subregions: the Hauran plain, which forms the heart of the region; the mountains of Jabal Hauran (also known as 'Jabal al-Druze' or 'Jabal al-Arab') east of the plain; and the Lajat volcanic field to the north of Jabal Hauran. The region is bound to the north by the Ghouta and Marj plains around Damascus and to the south by the desert steppe of Jordan. Its western boundary is marked by the Ruqqad tributary, which separates it from the Golan Heights (al-Jawlān in Arabic). It is eastwardly bound by the al-Safa, al-Harra and al-Hamad desert-steppes. Geographer John Lewis Burckhardt, writing in 1812, defined it as follows:

To the south of Jabal Kiswah and Jabal Khiyara begins the country of Hauran. It is bordered on the east by the rocky district of Lajat, and by the Jabal Hauran, both of which are sometimes comprised within the Hauran ... To the southeast, where Bosra and Ramtha are the farthest inhabited villages, the Hauran borders upon the desert. Its western limits are the chain of villages on the Hajj road, from Ghabaghib as far south as Ramtha ... Hauran comprises therefore part of Trachonitis and Iturea, the whole of Auranitis, and the northern districts of Batanea.

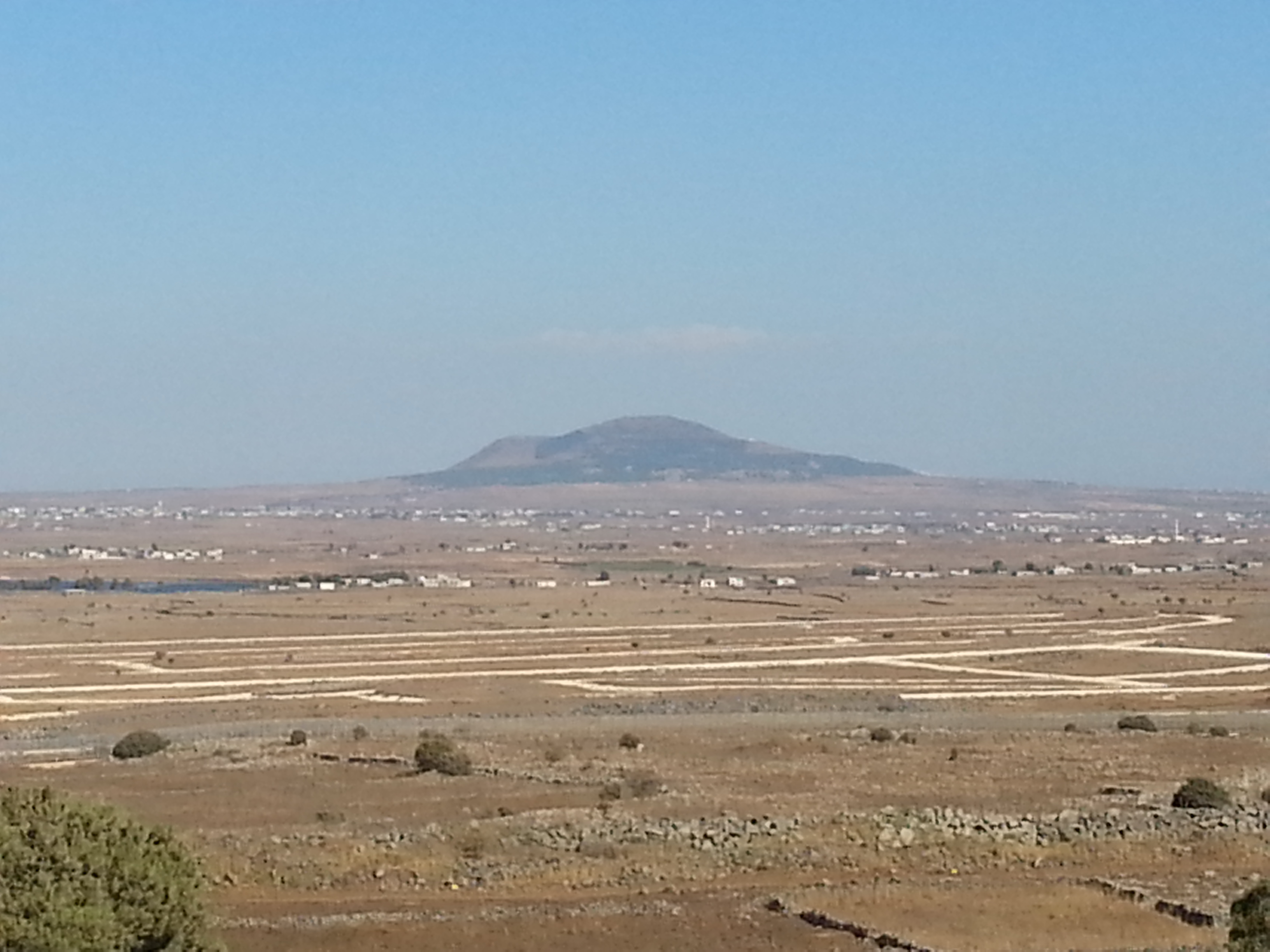
The Tell al-Hara volcanic cone in the Jaydur region of the Hauran plain, as seen from the Golan Heights to the west

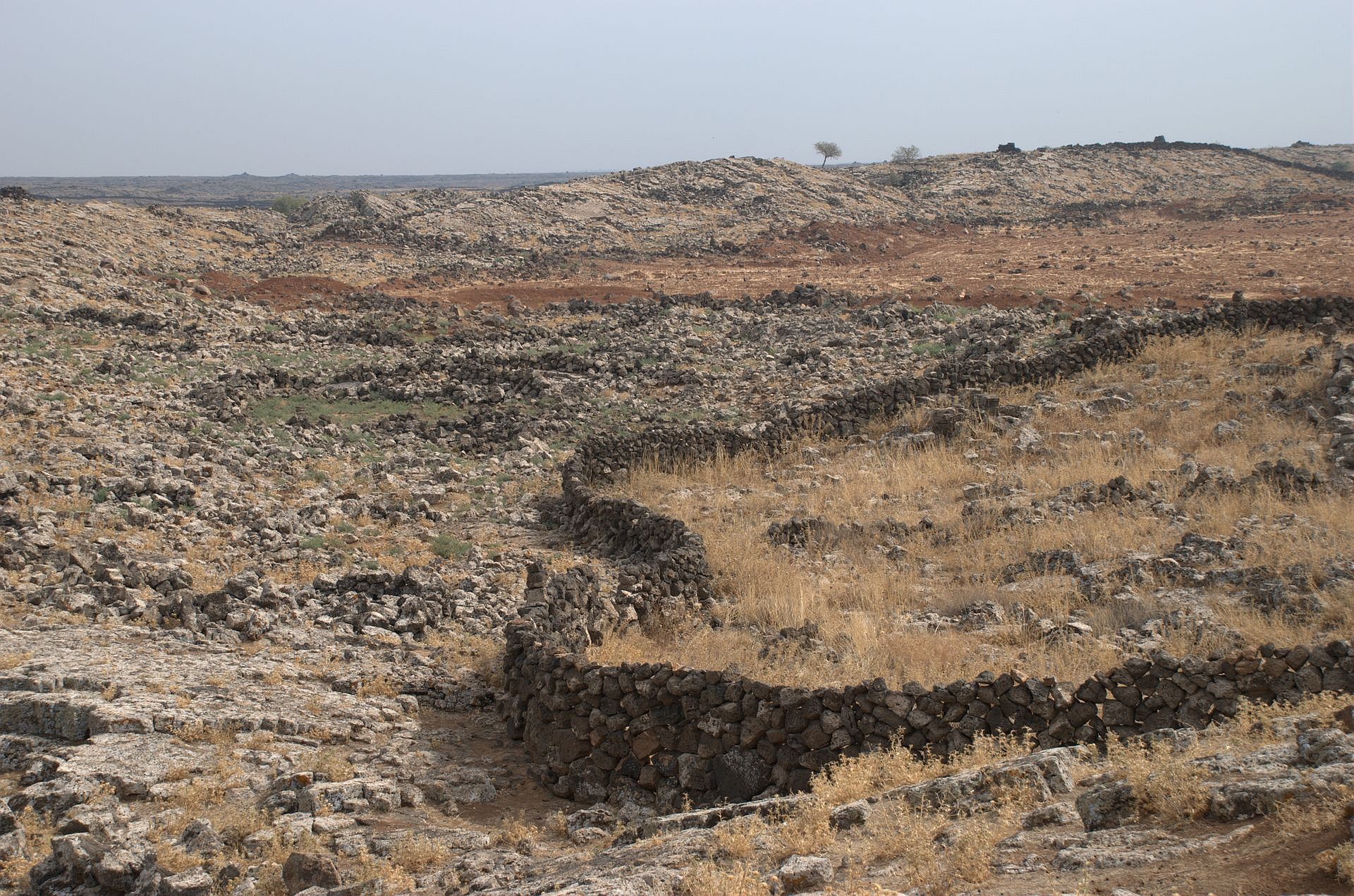
The land of the Hauran plain is arable, consisting of basalt-derived soil, while the Lajat (pictured) has stony ground and scarce vegetation

The plain of Hauran stretches between the Marj plain of Damascus southward into modern-day Jordan where it borders Jabal Ajlun to the southwest and the desert steppe to the south and southeast. To the west is the Golan plateau and to the east are the uplands of Jabal Hauran. The plain has historically been divided into the northern Jaydur and the southern Nuqrah. The former is identified with the ancient Iturea, while the latter is identified with the ancient Batanea (al-Bathaniyya in Arabic). The much larger Nuqrah extends northward to the approaches of al-Sanamayn, being bound to the east by the Lajat and Jabal Hauran. It forms the heart of the Hauran plain. Al-Nuqra is a relatively recent appellation, meaning 'the cavity' in Arabic. The Jaydur extends northwest from al-Sanamayn to the minor lava field located at the foothills of Mount Hermon (Jabal al-Shaykh in Arabic).

=== Topography ===
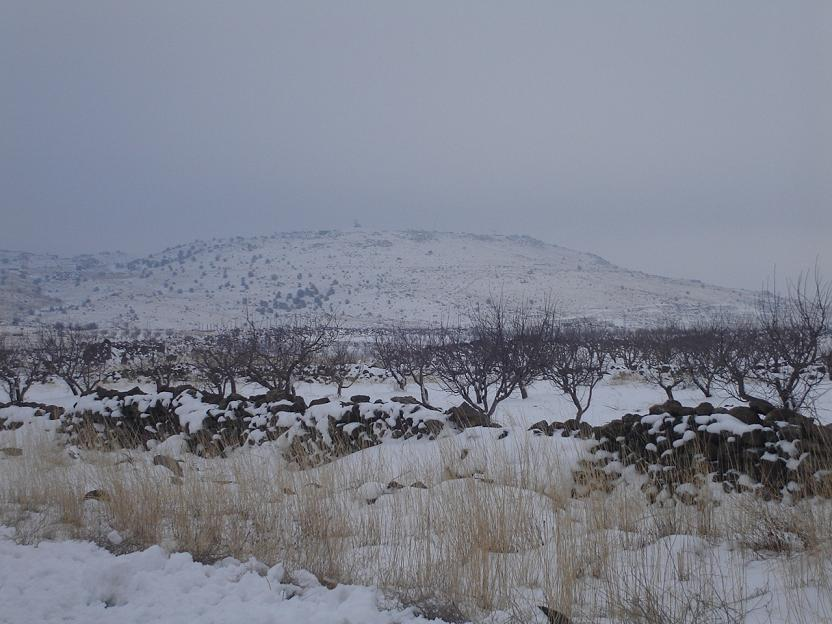
The highest point of the Jabal Hauran (pictured) is over 1,800 meters above sea level

A common feature throughout the Hauran is the basaltic topography, though altitude and soil vary between the Hauran's subregions. The Nuqrah, Jaydur and Jabal Hauran consist of arable land derived from decomposed basaltic, volcanic rock. The Nuqrah is a relatively low plateau measuring roughly 100 by 75 kilometers (62 mi × 47 mi) with an average elevation of 600 meters (2,000 ft) above sea level. Its land is characterized by vast, contiguous tracts of fertile, basalt-derived soil. In contrast to the Nuqrah, the Jaydur's landscape is more fractured and rocky. Its average elevation ranges between 600 and 900 meters (2,000 and 3,000 ft) above sea level, with some volcanic cones reaching above 1,000 meters (3,300 ft) above sea level, including Tell al-Hara. In terms of its landscape and cinder cones, the Jaydur is a topographic continuation of the Golan Heights. The Jabal Hauran was formed by large lava flows into a roughly 60 by 30 kilometers (37 mi × 19 mi) massif of volcanic hills, the highest point of which is over 1,800 meters (5,900 ft) above sea level in the range's center. The Lajat comprises a topography of depressions, rifts and ridges with scattered arable patches, and is characterized by rocky soil and scarce vegetation. Its average elevation is between 600–700 meters (2,000–2,300 ft) above sea level, though some of the area's volcanic cones are over 1,000 meters (3,300 ft) with the highest over 1,150 meters (3,770 ft).

=== Climate ===
Rainfall above the 200 millimetres (7.9 in) mark is characteristic throughout the Hauran, but otherwise climate and precipitation levels vary between its subregions. The relatively frequent rainfall and the abundance of water springs have historically allowed the Nuqrah and Jabal Hauran to become major grain-growing regions. The Hauran plain receives an average 250 millimetres (9.8 in) of rainfall, which allows the plains to support stable, grain-based agriculture. Jabal Hauran receives considerably greater rainfall, which supports more orchard and tree-based cultivation. Jabal Hauran is frequently covered by snow during the winter.

Monthly normal high and low temperatures (°C) for largest localities in the Hauran
City	Jan	Feb	Mar	Apr	May	Jun	Jul	Aug	Sep	Oct	Nov	Dec	Annual Max/Min	Citation
Bosra	12/2	13/3	17/5	22/8	27/12	31/15	32/16	32/16	31/15	27/12	20/8	14/3	23/10	
Daraa	13/3	15/4	18/6	24/9	28/12	31/16	33/18	33/19	31/16	28/13	21/8	15/5	24/11	
Nawa	13/4	15/4	18/6	22/9	28/13	31/16	32/18	33/18	31/16	28/13	21/9	15/5	24/11	
Ramtha	14/4	15/4	18/7	22/10	27/14	31/17	32/19	32/19	30/17	27/14	22/9	15/5	24/11	
Suwayda	10/2	12/3	15/5	20/8	25/11	29/14	30/16	31/16	29/14	26/12	19/8	13/4	22/9	

== History ==
There are records of settlements in the Hauran in the Ancient Egyptian Amarna letters and the Book of Deuteronomy of the Hebrew Bible, when the region was generally known as the Bashan. Control of it was contested between the Aramean kingdom of Damascus and the Kingdom of Israel during the 9th and 8th centuries BC. It was ultimately conquered and pillaged by the Assyrian Empire, which held onto it from 732 to 610 BC. The area is mentioned in the description of the future borders of Israel in Ezekiel 47:16. Bashān later saw security and prosperity under Achaemenid rule; its settlements became better developed and culturally Aramized.

=== Hellenistic period ===
During the Hellenistic period beginning in the mid-4th century BC, the Hauran was at first a possession of the Ptolemaic dynasty, which saw the region as a buffer zone separating their kingdom from Seleucid Damascus. Its sparse population consisted of semi-nomadic and nomadic groups such as the Itureans and Nabateans and the area remained largely undeveloped. The Seleucids conquered the Hauran following their victory over the Ptolemies in the Battle of Panium near Mount Hermon in 200 BC. During the decline of the Seleucid Empire, the Petra-based Nabatean Kingdom emerged to the Hauran's south. The Arab Nabateans expanded their presence to the southern Hauran towns of Bosra and Salkhad. By the end of the 2nd century BC, Seleucid control of the Hauran had become largely nominal and the region became a contested area between the Nabataean Kingdom, the Jerusalem-based Hasmonean dynasty and the Iturean principality based in the northern Golan and southern Mount Lebanon.

=== Roman era ===
==== Herodian period ====
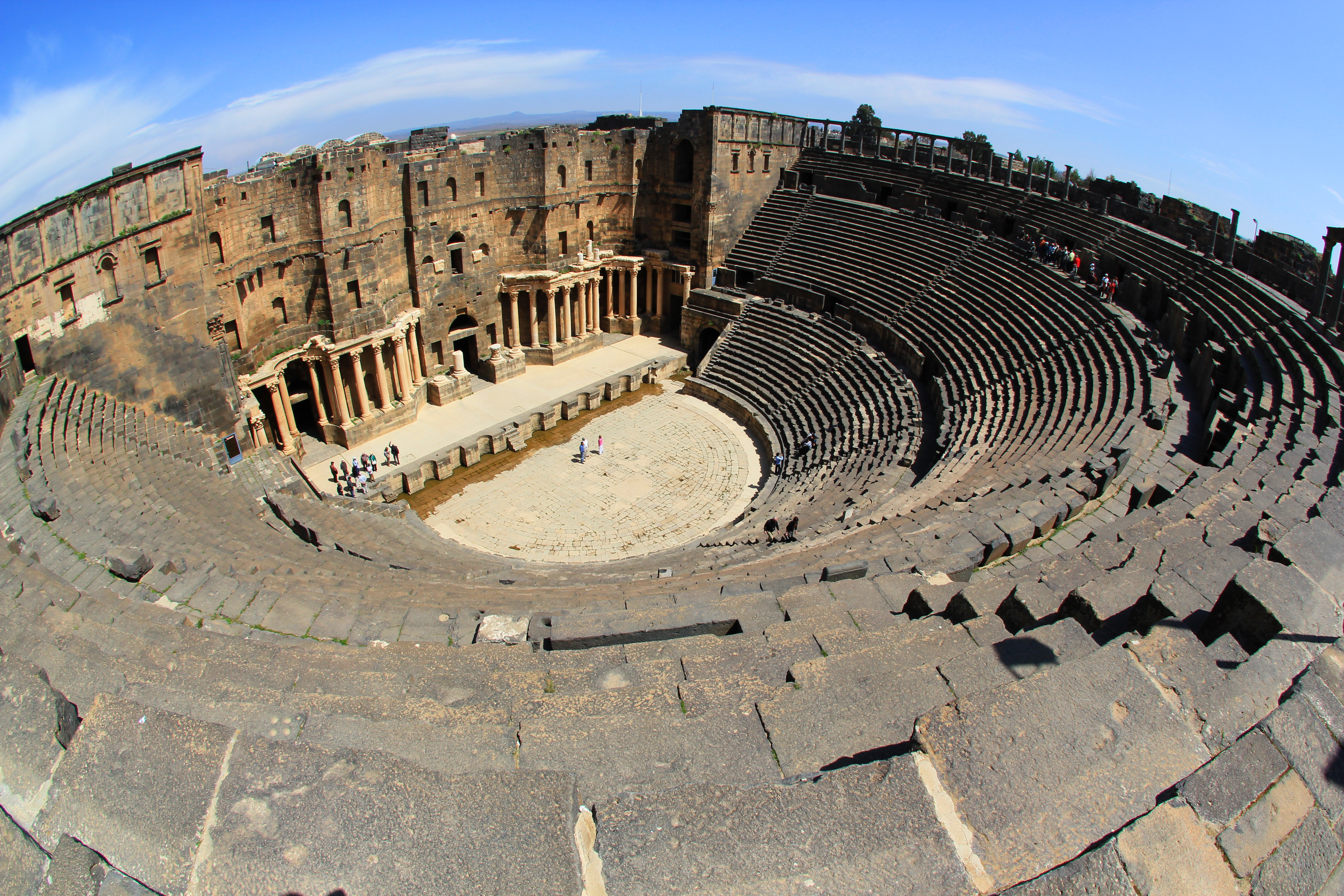
The Roman amphitheater of Bosra

By 63 BC the Roman Empire extended its influence to all of Syria and initially charged local princes with keeping order in Auranitis (Jabal Hauran), Batanea (Nuqrah) and Trachonitis (Lajat). However, the districts remained largely in the hands of nomadic tribes. To supplement their meager income, these nomads often raided nearby settlements as far as Damascus, and robbed pilgrims traversing the region. When Zenodorus, a prince entrusted with the Hauran districts' security, collaborated with the nomads, the Romans transferred the districts to their Judean client king, Herod the Great in 23 BC.

After Herod quelled resistance in the Hauran during the early years of his rule, the brigandage of the nomads largely ceased. Their rebellion resumed in 12 BC and two years later Herod renewed his efforts to bring the nomads to heel. This resulted in an alliance formed between the nomads of Trachonitis and Auranitis with the Nabateans in Transjordan, which defeated Herod's Idumean troops. Herod ultimately stabilized the area after establishing permanent colonies and a network of forts in the less vulnerable Batanea district, from which Herod's forces could keep order without fear of attack by the nomads of Auranitis and Trachonitis. Through the establishment of security, land distribution and early tax incentives, Batanea prospered under Herod and his successors and became Syria's main source of grain. Auranitis began to similarly prosper during the reign of Philip, Herod's successor in the Hauran.

==== Post-annexation ====
By the early 2nd century AD, the last vassal kings of the Hauran region, Agrippa II (r. 53 – 100 AD) of the Herodian Tetrarchy and Rabbel II (r. 70–106 AD) of the Nabatean Kingdom, had died and Rome under Emperor Trajan (r. 98–117) no longer saw the need for local intermediaries. The deaths of the Herodian and Nabatean monarchs in relatively quick succession provided an opportunity for the Romans to absorb their domains. In 106, the empire formally annexed the entire Hauran, incorporating its southern part in Arabia Province and its northern part in Syria Province. The provincial boundary followed the boundary just north of the Adraa–Bosra–Salkhad line that had separated the Herodian and Nabatean kingdoms. This administrative division remained intact for much of the 2nd century. This period, under the Antonine emperors who ruled until 180 AD, saw consistent stability, development and prosperity.

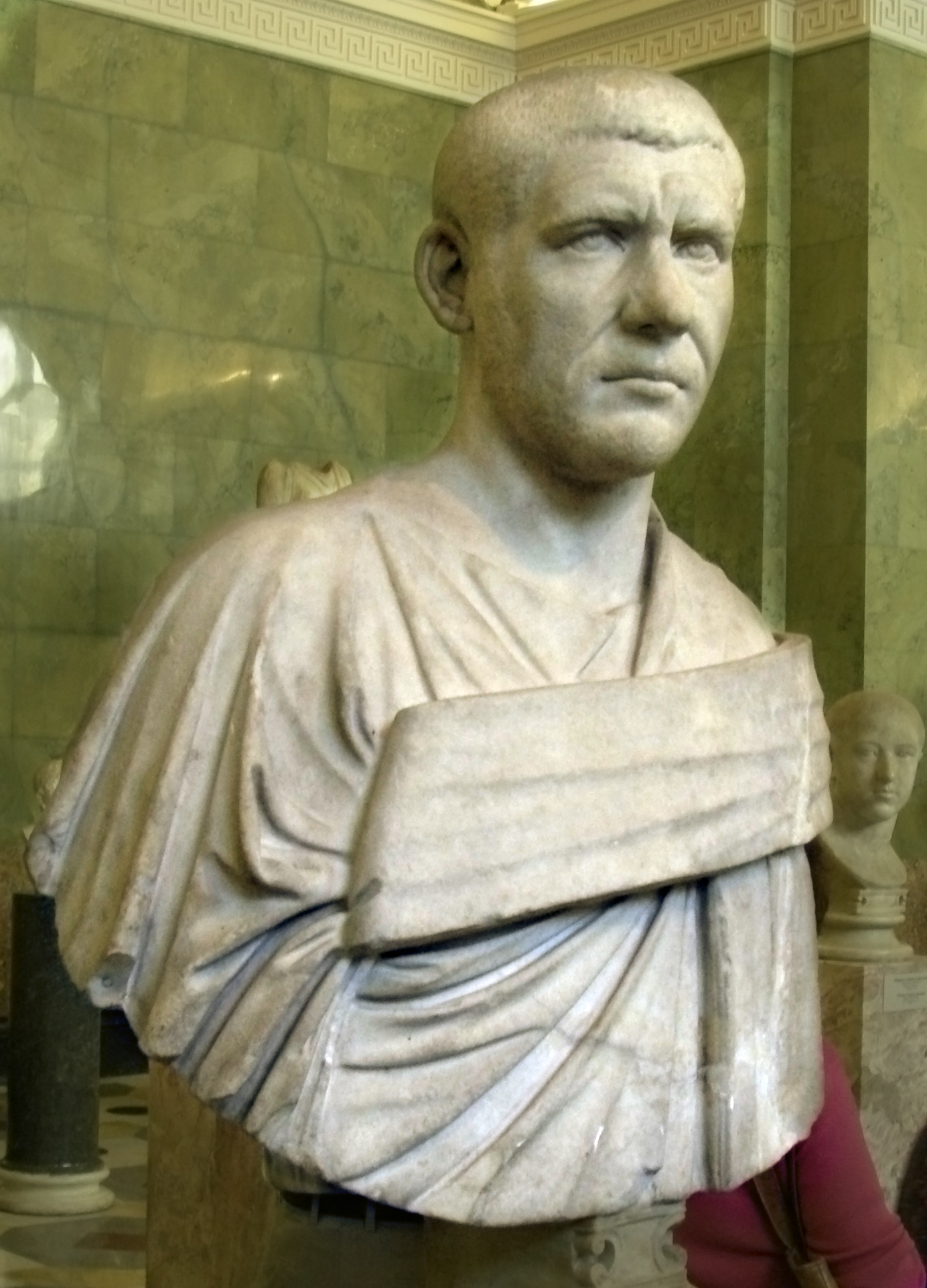
Bust of Emperor Philip the Arab, a native of the Hauran

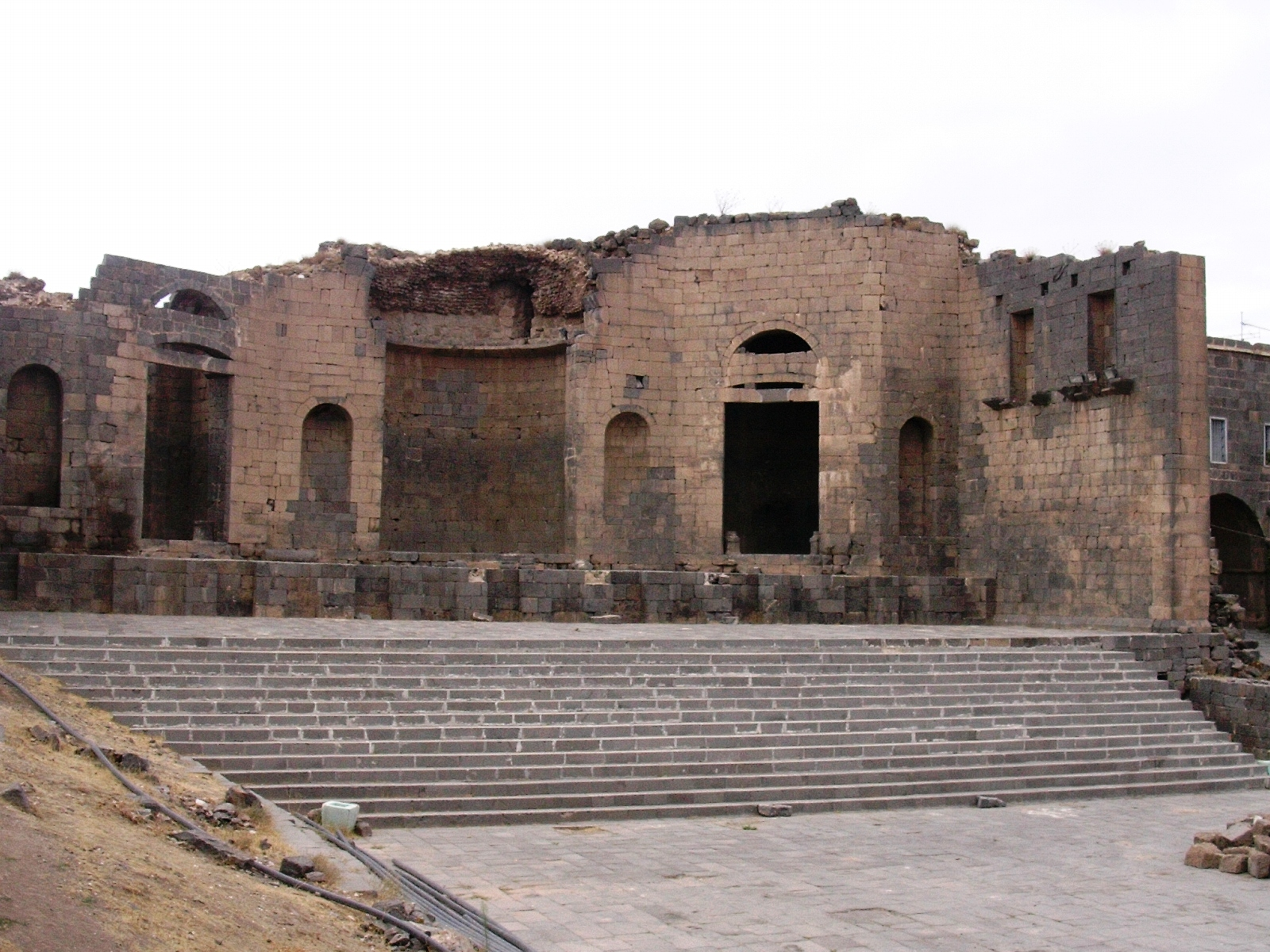
The Philippeion forum in Shahba (Philippopolis) built by Emperor Philip

During the late 2nd century, imperial order gradually weakened and political instability ensued. In 244 a native of the Hauran, Philip the Arab, became emperor and turned his hometown of Shahba (Philippopolis) into an imperial city. Though Shahba and Auranitis prospered, the general state of the empire was marked by decline. Philip was killed in 249 and Auranitis was largely abandoned in the late 3rd century. By the early 3rd century, Auranitis, Batanea and Trachonitis had been annexed to Arabia, bringing the entire Hauran under the jurisdiction of a single province. This also coincided with the completion of the north–south Via Nova Traiana road connecting the Red Sea-port of Ayla with Bosra, the provincial capital, and an east–west road connecting the cities of the Adraa–Bosra–Salkhad line. Commenting on this development, historian Henry Innes MacAdam writes:

For the first time since the Hellenistic age the Hawran in its entirety came under one administrative system. The road network and the settlements it linked were the framework upon which the economic and social infrastructure of the region was built. Secure towns and safe, well-maintained roads meant that internal and external commerce could flow freely. The wine and grain of the Hawran were marketed, we may assume, far and wide.

After Rome's annexation, the rural villages of the Hauran exercised considerable self-rule. Each village had common areas and buildings, a law council and a treasury. Between the late 1st and 5th centuries, several underwent urbanization and became cities, including Qanawat (Canatha), Suwayda (Dionysias), Shahba (Philippopolis), Shaqqa (Maxmimianopolis), al-Masmiyah (Phaina) and Nawa (Naveh). The inhabitants were generally wealthy landowners whose large dwellings housed their extended families. Among the inhabitants were Roman army veterans who upon returning to their villages in the Hauran invested money in land, houses, tombs, temples and public buildings and filled high-ranking local positions. Agriculture was the main economic sector, with Batanea and Auranitis mainly producing grain and wine, respectively, both of which were important to imperial trade.

Much of the settled population consisted of Arameans, Jews and a larger Arab population, consisting of Nabateans and Safaitic groups. These groups continued to use Semitic languages, mainly Aramaic and an early form of Arabic at the colloquial level, though the Hellenization process was well underway and by the 4th century Greek supplanted the Hauran's native languages at the official level. Though the particularly wealthy and army veterans engaged in Hellenistic activities, such as visiting theaters and bathhouses, much of the population held on to Arab and Aramaic traditions and worshiped their native gods.

=== Byzantine era ===
Arab groups, including from South Arabia, continued to migrate to the Hauran well into the Byzantine period. During the 4th and 5th centuries, when direct imperial rule was weakened and nomadic groups overran the Sinai and the Euphrates valley, the Byzantines turned to certain powerful Arab tribes to maintain internal order and guard the Hauran. Beginning in the 4th century, this role was played by the Lakhmids, and by the Salihids for much of the 5th century. These groups protected the population in return for payment in gold and corn.

==== Ghassanid period ====
In the early 6th century, the Salihids were replaced by the Ghassanids. The Ghassanids established themselves in Arabia Province and like the Salihids, embraced Christianity. They became formal military allies of the Byzantines in 502, contributing troops in the wars with Sassanian Persia and the Persians' Lakhmid vassals. In 531, the Ghassanid chieftain al-Harith ibn Jabalah was decreed 'phylarch of all Arabs' in the empire, but by 582 his son (and the last powerful Ghassanid phylarch) al-Mundhir III was arrested and exiled. This led to a rebellion in the Hauran and a siege on Bosra led by al-Mundhir's son al-Nu'man VI, which only ended when the latter was allowed by the Byzantines to reestablish the Ghassanid phylarchy. This only lasted until al-Nu'man was exiled in 584, after which the empire dissolved the phylarchy into numerous, smaller Ghassanid and other Arab Christian units. Some of these units continued to fight alongside the Byzantines, but their overall power had diminished, leaving the area more vulnerable to invasion. In 613, the Sassanian Persians invaded Syria and defeated the Byzantines in a battle between Adraa and Bosra.

The Byzantine era in the Hauran was marked by the dual processes of rapid Arabization and the growth of Christianity. The region's Ghassanid rulers were semi-nomadic and established permanent encampments throughout the Hauran, chief of which was al-Jabiya, but also Aqraba, Jalliq, Harith al-Jawlan and others. They were entrusted by the Byzantines to secure the Hauran's agricultural production and stave off nomadic marauders. The region prospered under Ghassanid supervision and the tribe itself built or patronized secular and religious architecture in the region's villages, including churches, monasteries and large homes for their chieftains. Although a Christian presence in some cities of Auranitis was established in the 2nd and 3rd centuries, by the 5th century nearly all the villages in the Hauran had churches, most of them dedicated to saints favored by the Arabs. The Ghassanids played a significant role in promoting Monophysite Christianity in Syria which was viewed as heretic by the Chalcedonian Church embraced by most Byzantine emperors.

=== Early Islamic era ===
The advent of Islam in Arabia and its expansion northward to Syria was countered by the Byzantines and their Arab Christian allies. However, the region's defenses had been significantly weakened as a consequence of the Ghassanids' decline in status in 582–584. The first Arab Muslim forces arrived in the Hauran in April 634 and Bosra was conquered by them in May. Following the decisive Muslim victory in the Battle of Yarmouk in 636, all of the Hauran came under Muslim rule. The Umayyad dynasty took control of the expanding Islamic caliphate and relocated its capital from Medina to Damascus and were supported by the people of Hauran. After the death of the Umayyad caliph Mu'awiya II and the ensuing chaos of succession, the Umayyads' Arab tribal allies in Syria convened a summit in the Hauran town of al-Jabiya, where they chose Marwan I to be the next caliph, in opposition to the ascendant Mecca-based Abd Allah ibn al-Zubayr. Following the Abbasids’ toppling of the Umayyads in 750, the Arab tribes of Hauran rose in a rebellion that was put down by the Abbasid general Abd Allah ibn Ali.

During the early Muslim period (7th-10th centuries), the Hauran formed part of the military district of Damascus, itself a part of the larger province of Bilad al-Sham. The Hauran subdistrict roughly corresponded to the ancient Auranitis and its capital was Bosra, while the Bathaniyya subdistrict corresponded to the ancient Batanea and had Adhri'at as its capital. Settlement within the Hauran continued and in some cases "thrived" in the early Islamic period, with "no perceptible change in activity or cultural patterns under the Umayyad caliphs", according to historian Moshe Hartal. According to the 10th-century Muslim geographer Istakhri, the Hauran and Bathaniyya were "...two great districts of the Damascus Province. Their fields are rain-watered. The frontiers of these two districts extend down to... ...the Balqa district and Amman".

The Abbasid period in Hauran was marked by numerous damaging raids from the Qarmatians of eastern Arabia in the 10th century. After 939, the Hauran and Bathaniyya districts came under the direct rule of the Egyptian-based Ikhshidid dynasty, nominal governors of the Abbasids. During this period, the large Arab tribe of Banu Uqayl, formerly allies of the Qarmatians, migrated to the Syrian steppe extending from the Hauran northward to Upper Mesopotamia. After 945, the de jure Ikshidid ruler Abu al-Misk Kafur assigned the Uqaylid sheikhs (chieftains) Salih ibn Umayr and Zalim ibn Mawhub with keeping order in the Hauran districts. This ended when the Fatimids conquered southern Syria in 970 and the Uqayl were consequently chased out of the Hauran by the Fatimid-allied tribes of Banu Fazara and Banu Murra. The villages of Hawran and Bathaniyya were rehabilitated by Abu Mahmud Ibrahim, the nominal Fatimid governor of Damascus, in the early 980s, after the damage inflicted on the area by the Fazara and Murra. Tenth-century geographers describe the Hauran and Bathaniyya as large districts and centers of grain production. Writing in c. 985, the geographer al-Maqdisi noted that cultivated areas extended to Adhri'at and that the Hauran subdistrict was well known for its vineyards.

=== Middle Islamic era ===
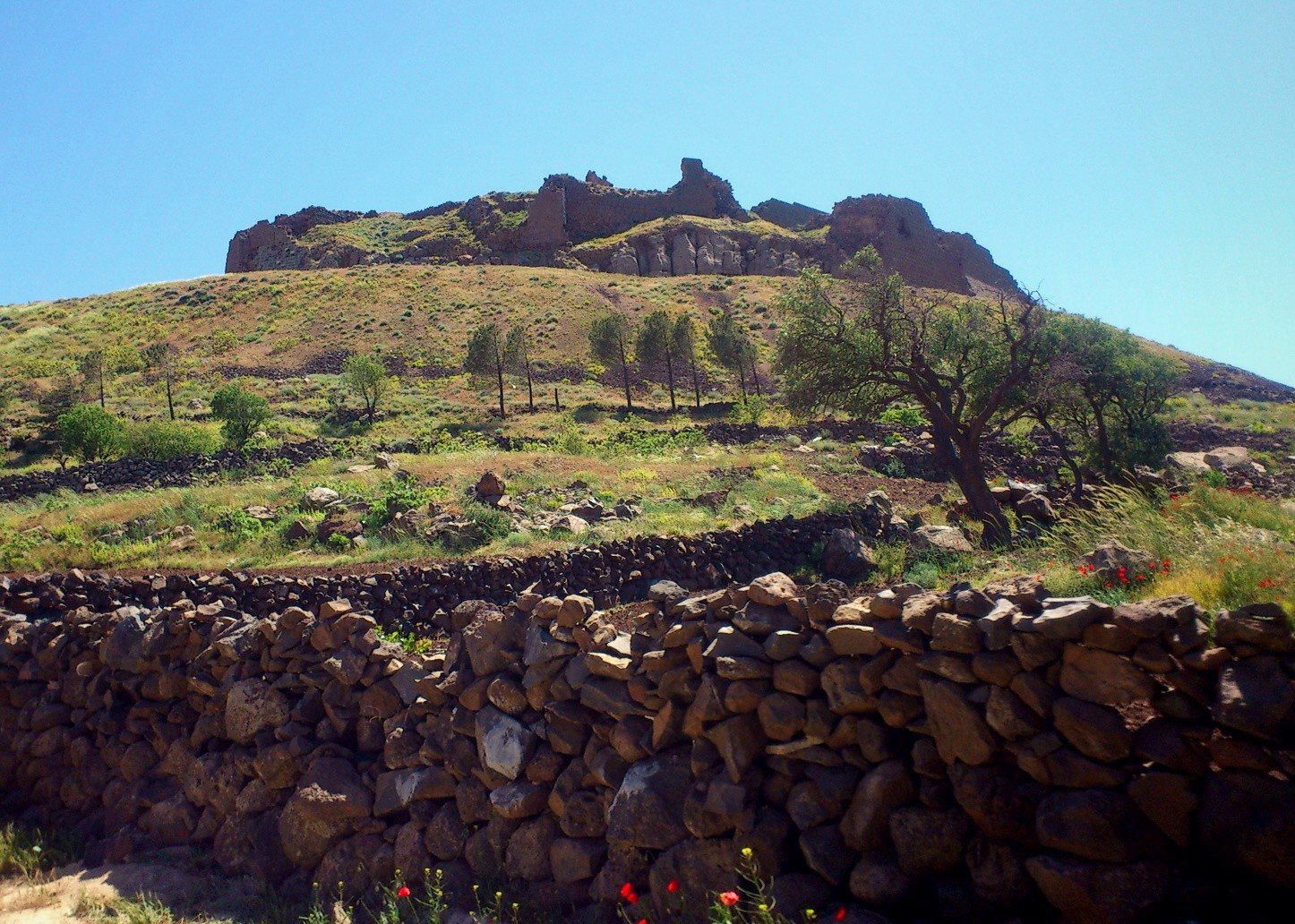
During Mamluk rule, the fortress of Salkhad in Jabal Hauran was an administrative unit and its ruler was a high-ranking emir.

The arrival of the Crusaders in the coastal regions of Bilad al-Sham in 1099 had repercussions for the Hauran and the region was periodically targeted by Crusaders in plundering campaigns. These occurred when the Crusaders captured Muslim-held fortresses in the Hauran or passed by the region after raids against Damascus. In the early 12th century, the entire Hauran was assigned by the Burid emir of Damascus to the Turkish general Amin al-Dawla Kumushtakin as an iqta (fief), which he held until his death in 1146. Under his patronage the region, and Bosra in particular, saw a renewal of building activity after a roughly 300-year hiatus. The population of the Hauran at the time was largely Greek Orthodox.

The last recorded appearance of the Crusaders in Hauran was in 1217. The Ayyubids had conquered the region in the late 12th century, but their rule collapsed in Syria following the Mongol invasion in 1260. That year the Mongols were defeated by the Mamluks at the Battle of Ain Jalut and Syria, including the Hauran, came under Mamluk rule. During the 12th and 13th centuries, the Hauran continued to be administratively divided into the Hauran and Bathaniyya districts of Damascus. In general, both districts were well-populated and prosperous, benefiting particularly from grain production. Though mostly Muslim, a significant portion of the inhabitants were Christians. A contemporary Syrian geographer Yaqut al-Hamawi (died 1229) described the Hauran as "a large district full of villages and very fertile".

Following its incorporation into the Mamluk Sultanate, the Hauran became part of the Damascus-centered administrative division of al-Safqa al-Qibliyya ('the Southern March') and continued to be divided into the two districts of the Bosra-centered Hauran and the Adhri'at-centered Bathaniyya. In addition, there were the two smaller administrative units of Salkhad, a fortress town typically held by a high-ranking Mamluk emir, and Zur', which corresponded with the Lajat. Under the Mamluks, the region's strategic importance stemmed from its position on the barid (postal route) between Gaza and Damascus and Bosra's role as a major marshaling point for the Hajj caravans going to Mecca. In the 15th century, the historian Khalil al-Zahiri noted that the Hauran region contained some 1,000 villages.

The arrival of nomadic clans from the Banu Rabi'a tribe of Tayy during this period caused instability in the region, but they eventually became settled inhabitants. The two main branches of the Banu Rabi'a were the Al Fadl (and its subbranch of Al Ali) and the Al Mira; the latter drove out the Al Fadl or the Al Ali from the Hauran and became the leading Bedouin force there by the mid-13th century. The emirs of the Al Mira, considered by Mamluk-era historians as muluk al-Arab ('kings of the Bedouins') of southern Syria, had numerous clans and tribes under their supervision, with their paramount emir Ahmad ibn Hajji recognized by the Mamluk sultan Baybars. The Al Mira emirs and their allies held the region from the Jawlan through the Harra basaltic desert. Another of the major tribes of the Hauran during the Mamluk period were the Zubayd, whose tribal territory spanned the region from Salkhad northeastward toward the Euphrates. A decree from 1333 spelled out the Al Mira's emir's duties, which were "central to the administration of the Hawran", according to historian Yossef Rapoport. Among those duties was limiting tribes' movement beyond their territories, ensuring the safety of the Hajj caravan, and securing Syria's desert frontiers. In 1400, amid the invasion of Tamerlane, the Al Mira confiscated the grain revenues of the Hauran. The next year, the Mamluks raided the Al Mira's headquarters around Suwayda, seizing thousands of camels.

=== Ottoman era ===
==== Early Ottoman period ====
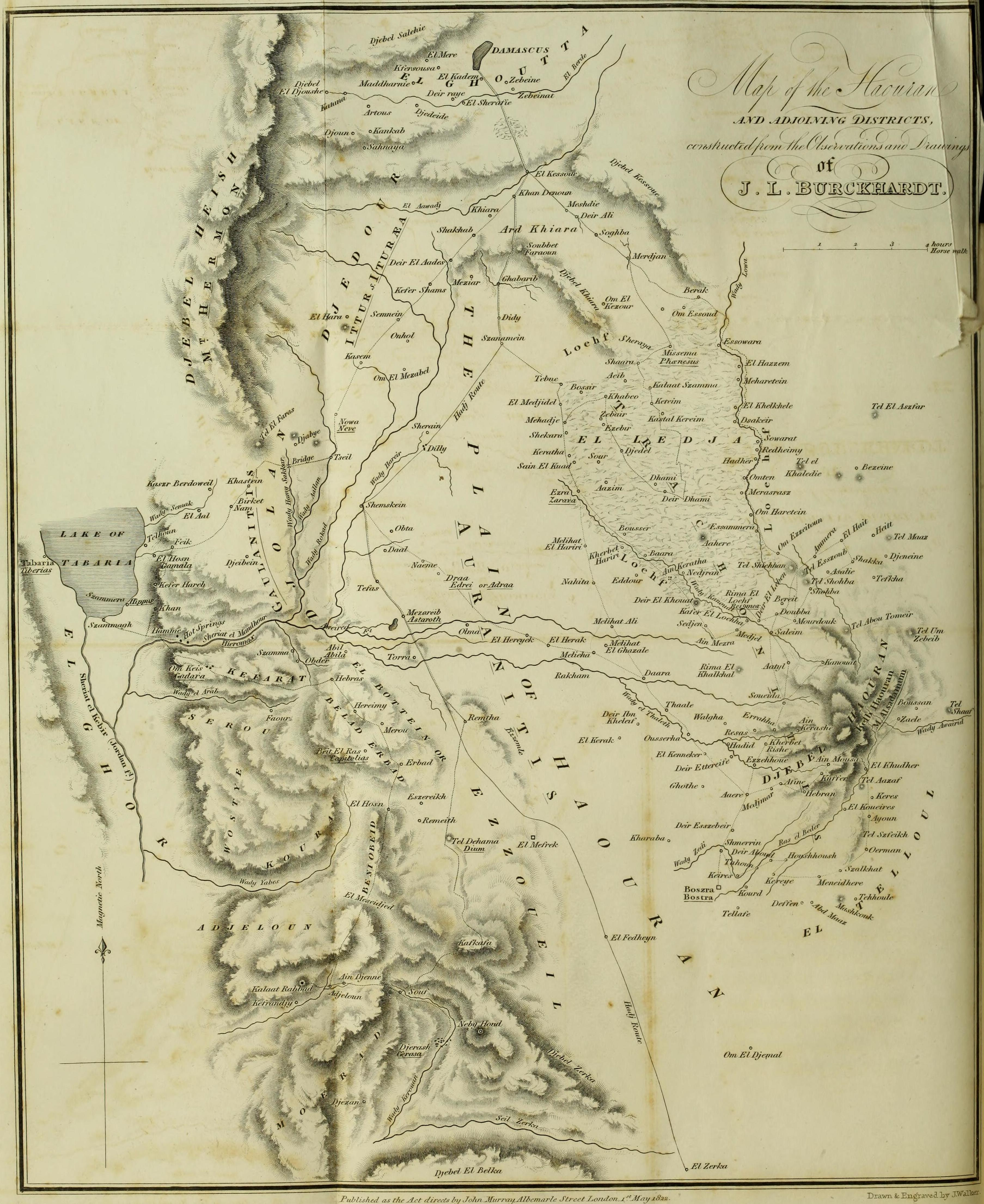
Johann Ludwig Burckhardt's map of the Hauran, published in 1822

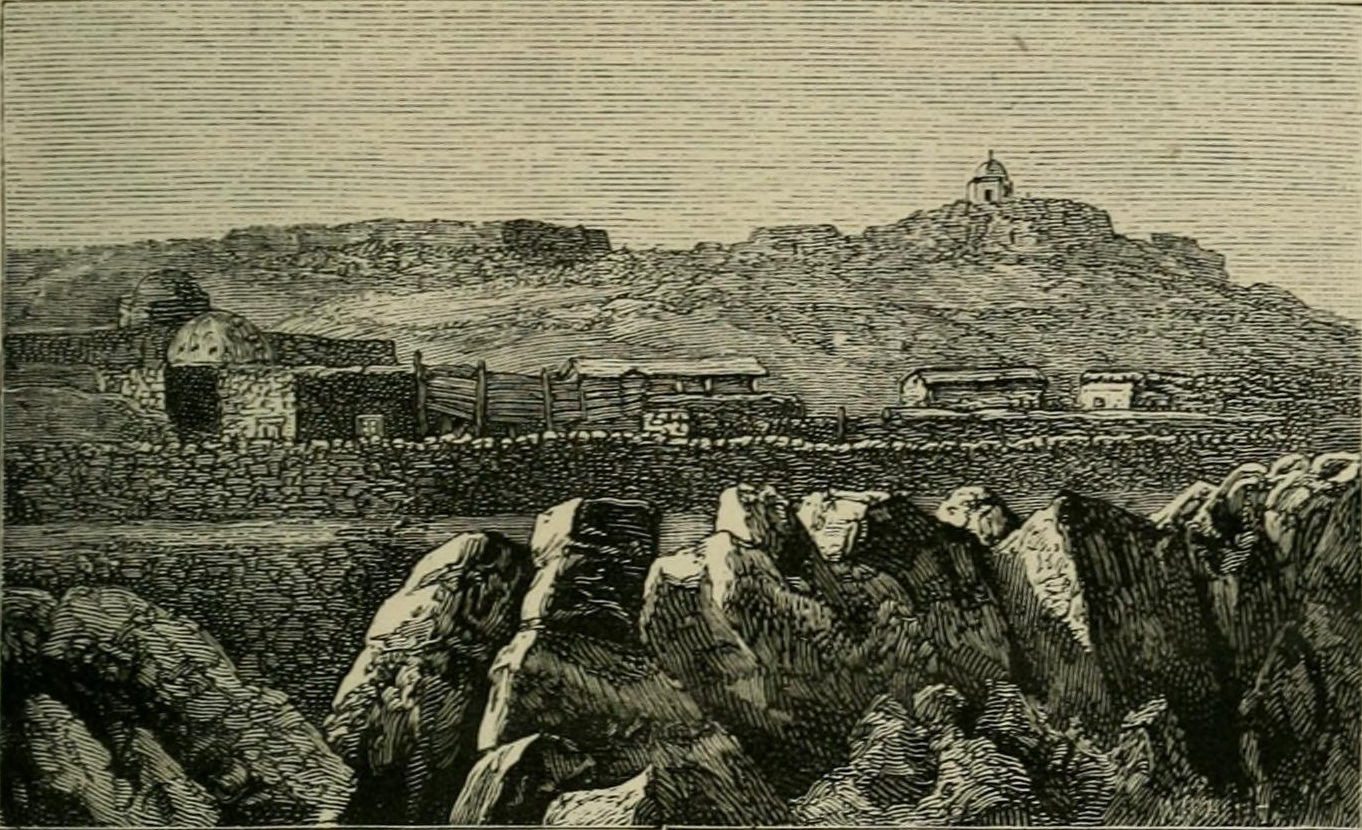
An 1886 sketch of al-Shaykh Saad, the administrative center of the Hauran Sanjak.

The Hauran was incorporated into the Ottoman Empire following its conquest of Mamluk Syria in 1516 and became part of the Damascus Eyalet (Damascus Province). As shown in 16th-century Ottoman tax registers, the Hauran was divided into at least fourteen nahiyes (subdistricts), many named after the tribe that either dominated the subdistrict or historically resided there, containing between 250 and 350 villages. (Note: The names of the nahiyes were Jaydur (centered in Nawa), Jawlan Gharbi was Sharqi, Banu Kilab, Banu Muqlid, Banu Malik al-Ashraf, Banu Nashba, Banu Hilal, Banu Abdullah, Banu Malik al-Sadir, Banu Atika, Banu Kinana, Banu Jahma, Banu al-A'sar, and Banu Uqba.) Large numbers of primarily grain-growing villages in the Hauran plain and the western slopes of Jabal Hauran continued to exist into the 17th century. Most of the inhabitants paid taxes on wheat and barley. The inhabitants were largely Muslims, though there was a Christian minority in several of the nahiyes.

The first Ottoman governor of Damascus, Janbirdi al-Ghazali, who had served the same role under the Mamluks, initially appeased the Bedouin chief of the Hauran, Janbay, who had been the emir of the Al Mira since the late 15th century. Janbay was vested with official authority to guard the roads passing through the Hauran, while his powerful brother-in-law from the Beqaa Valley, Nasir Ibn al-Hanash, was granted control of the large Hauran village of Nawa. Tensions between the government and the Bedouin of the Hauran were raised when Nasir was dismissed by Sultan Selim I in 1517, leading Janbirdi to lead an expedition into the Hauran to disperse the Bedouin who gathered to threaten the Hajj caravan. Throughout the 16th century, the Bedouin Mafarija tribe, including its Sardiyya faction, became an increasingly prominent force in the Hauran. As early as 1518 and 1519, Janbirdi repeated his precautionary expeditions in the Hauran, now against the Sardiyya sheikh Salama ibn Fawwaz, better known as Jughayman, to ensure the safety of the Hajj caravan. In 1564, there was a major rebellion by the tribes in the southern Hauran, which was suppressed by the authorities.

In the late 16th and early 17th centuries, rival leaders of the Mafarija/Sardiyya vied for the mashaykha (chieftainship) of the Hauran and its associated sarr (government subsidy for protection of the Hajj caravan). In 1570, Jughayman's descendant, Salama ibn Na'im, was given the office to compensate for another Sardiyya chief being dismissed as amir al-hajj (commander of the Hajj caravan). Salama and his counterpart from a rival section of the Mafarija, Amr ibn Jabr, consistently struggled for control of this office into the first decade of the 17th century, with the office switching hands between them several times. This struggle continued between Amr ibn Jabr and Salama's son Rashid. Amr gained the mashaykha in 1607, due to support from the Druze strongman of Mount Lebanon Fakhr al-Din Ma'n, through 1612, when Rashid's attempts to unseat him finally succeeded with backing from the amir al-hajj Farrukh Pasha. Amr later regained office by 1616 but was dismissed in 1619 in favor of Rashid, leading Amr to seek Fakhr al-Din's successful intervention in the same year. He was replaced by Rashid again in 1621 after intervention by Farrukh Pasha and Rashid held the office at least through 1624. As late as the early 18th century, the mashaykha of the Hauran was held by descendants of Rashid, first his powerful grandson Kulayb ibn Hamad, who was executed by the governor Nasuh Pasha in 1714, and then Kulayb's less militant son Tahir (or Dahir). The latter was granted the office instead of the Mafarija chief Jabr by the governor Isma'il Pasha al-Azm (r. 1725–1730) and who later allied with the strongman of northern Palestine, Daher al-Umar, to restore himself to office in the late 1730s.

==== Late Ottoman period ====
===== Increased Bedouin pressures and Druze influx =====
Officially, the grain-producing lands of the Hauran belonged to the Ottoman state and its inhabitants were required to pay taxes and be conscripted into the army. As state authority receded, the region effectively became autonomous. An exception to this virtual autonomy came during the annual thirty- to sixty-day Hajj season, during which the state mobilized its forces to organize, protect and supply the annual Muslim pilgrim caravan to Mecca and Medina; In the 18th century, the Hajj caravan route was moved westward from Bosra to Muzayrib, which became the caravan's marshaling point in the Hauran. Instead of their direct involvement in the Hauran, the authorities entrusted its affairs to the Damascene aghawat, who commanded small, mobile units of mounted irregulars. In return for the political and economic influence they were allowed in the Hauran, the aghawat secured revenue from the region's population to fund the Hajj caravan, escorted the caravan and other travelers and policed the region. The principal restriction on the power of the aghawat was resistance from the Hauran's inhabitants. Thus, the aghawat sought to become more indispensable to the local population. To that end, they often mediated between the settled inhabitants of the plain and the Bedouin nomads, and between the Hauran's population as a whole and all outside powers, including the state. According to historian Linda S. Schilcher,

This hinterland political system had its own internal checks and, of course, its strains, but it appears to have existed with a fair degree of equilibrium for a very long period of time. The low pressure of population on the land and the natural economies that existed between steppe and cultivated plain and between town and countryside appear to have contributed to this relatively stable situation.

Bedouin tribes from the Anaza confederation increasingly took advantage of the security vacuum. The Bedouin encamped in the Hauran in the spring and retreated into the desert as soon as the autumn rains began. The Anaza's entry into the Hauran caused the exodus of the semi-nomadic tribes of the Banu Rabi'a confederation. The largest tribes that encamped in the Hauran were the Wuld Ali (also known as Awlad Ali), who arrived in the early 18th century, and the Rwala, who arrived in the late 18th century. Both were part of the Anaza confederation. Smaller tribes included the Sardiyya, the Sirhan and the Sulut. The Sulut, which was based in the Lajat wilderness, was the only Bedouin tribe that remained relatively stationary.

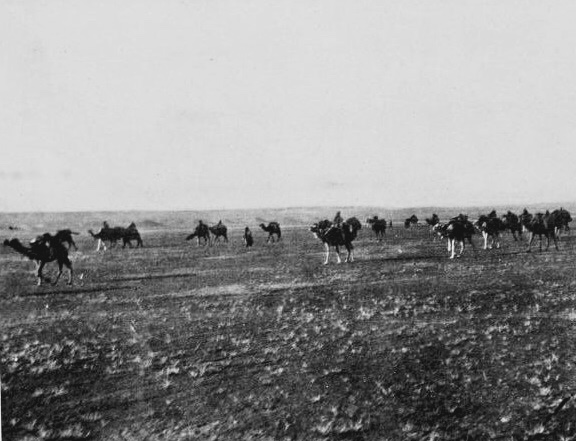
A group of Anaza Bedouin and their camels on the move to better pastures in the Syrian desert steppe. Beginning in the 18th century the Anaza seasonally encamped in the Hauran.

The Bedouin used the Hauran for access to water, to graze their camels and sheep and to stock up on supplies for the winter. They traded their livestock and meats for grains from the plainsmen, and wares from other Syrian merchants. The Hajj caravan was a major source of income for the Bedouin, who supplied the pilgrims with protection, logistical support, meat and transportation. Bedouin depredations against the locals included the imposition of the khuwwa (tribute), ostensibly in return for protection. The Bedouin also launched occasional raids and their flocks often grazed on the plainsmen's fields.

In addition to the Bedouin, the 18th and 19th centuries also witnessed large migrations of Druze from Mount Lebanon to the Jabal Hauran, which gradually became known as the Jabal al-Druze ('mountain of the Druze'). Their arrival pushed the mountain's previous inhabitants to the Hauran plains and introduced a new element of instability to the region. A small group of Druze led by the Alam al-Din family first arrived in 1685. A much larger wave arrived in the region as a result of the intra-Druze Battle of Ain Dara in 1711. The new arrivals were concentrated in the northwestern corner of Jabal Hauran and the Lajat and established roots in abandoned villages with extensive ancient ruins. The area was chosen by the Druze because it was well-watered, defensible and relatively close to the Druze settlements in the Damascus countryside and Mount Hermon. The paramount leaders of the community between 1711 and 1860 were the Najran-based Al Hamdan family.

Persistent migrations of Druze from Mount Lebanon, Wadi al-Taym and the Galilee, caused by the increased turbulence they faced, continued throughout the 18th century: historian Kais Firro stated that "each sign of danger in their traditional lands of settlement seemed to instigate a new Druze migration to the Hauran". During the final years of the decade-long Egyptian administration of Syria, the Druze of Jabal Hauran launched their first revolt against the authorities, in response to a conscription order by Ibrahim Pasha. By then, their numbers in the region had been swollen by migration. The 1860 Mount Lebanon civil war between the Druze and Christians and the resulting French military intervention caused another large exodus of Druze to Jabal Hauran.

The Hauran plains declined economically and demographically during the 17th and 18th centuries. Factors that caused this decline included the taxation of the peasantry by both the government and the Bedouin, periodic raids by the Bedouin and the encroachments of their livestock, and occasional strife with the neighboring Druze, Ottoman irregulars and between themselves. Many southern plainsmen migrated to the northern Hauran plain, where the soil was more productive in comparison to the drier south and was less often overrun by the Bedouin and their herds. According to the historian Norman Lewis, southern Haurani plainsmen "had been moving northwards for generations". Thus, by the start of the 19th century, the northern plains contained several full or half-empty villages, while the south had been all but deserted, with the exception of the larger towns of Daraa (Adhri'at), Bosra and Ramtha.

===== Regional revival and centralization =====
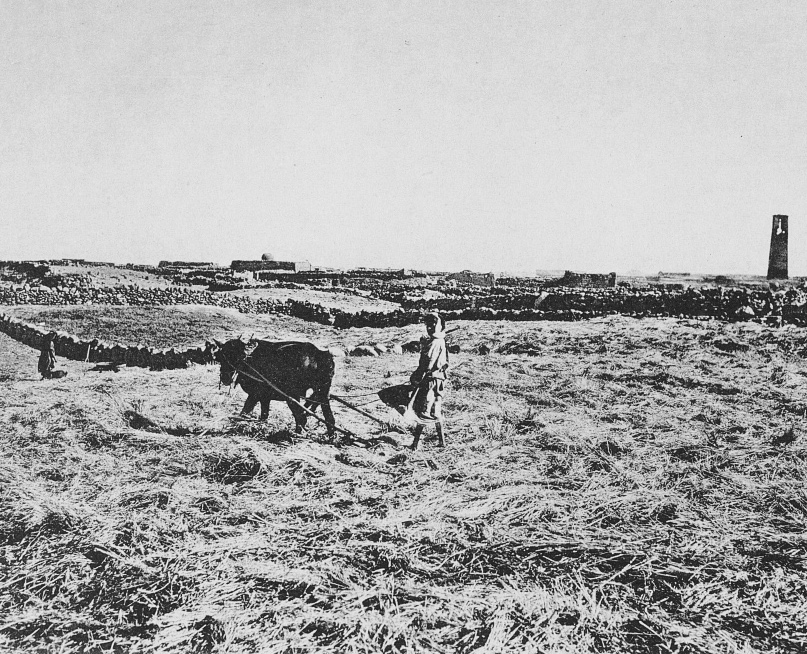
Grain being threshed in Daraa, 1906. Grain was the chief crop of the Hauran, the cultivation of which led to the region's revival in the second half of the 19th century.

During the 1850s, increased demand for grain in the Damascene and European markets led to a resurgence of grain cultivation in the Hauran. This in turn brought about the mass resettlement of abandoned villages and the establishment of new settlements. By the end of the decade, resettlement caused a scarcity of grazing lands for Bedouin livestock.

The civil war of 1860, which spilled over into Damascus, where thousands of Christians were massacred, spurred the Ottomans to expand their centralization efforts in Syria. Prior to 1860, the Hauran had been largely excluded from the Tanzimat centralization reforms. In January 1861, the provincial governor, Fu'ad Pasha. attempted to integrate and reorganize the region. There followed other largely unsuccessful attempts by four successive Ottoman governors. At the time, the Hauran's leadership consisted of the chiefs of the largely pacified clans of the plains, such as Al Miqdad and Al Hariri; the more rebellious chiefs of the Druze clans of Jabal Hauran, such as Al Hamdan and Bani al-Atrash; and the chiefs of the Bedouin tribes of Rwala, Wuld Ali, Sirhan and Sardiyah, whose herds seasonally grazed the Hauran plains.

The centralization efforts, backed by the Damascene aghawat, faced stiff resistance. They were opposed by both the Druze of Ismail al-Atrash and a coalition he formed, that included the Bedouin and many of the Haurani plainsmen. This coalition was defeated in 1862 and the government came to terms with al-Atrash, entrusting him to collect taxes from the entire Hauran and to pay heavy fines in place of conscription. Though this did not translate into the ultimate goal of integrating the Hauran, and the Bedouin continued their rebellions in 1863–1864, it still ended the region's virtual autonomy.

Not until the appointment of Rashid Pasha did centralization efforts take hold. Rashid sought to change the general view in the Hauran that the government was an alien power that was only intent on collecting taxes and conscripting its youth. He accomplished this change by according the chiefs of Wuld Ali and Rwala adequate grazing lands; granting the leaders of the plainsmen and the Druze certain privileges and state functions; and replacing the aghawat as the state's intermediaries with the locals, whilst still utilizing them for military campaigns in Transjordan and facilitating the Hajj caravan. Tax concessions were also granted, but an Ottoman military presence was retained, as Rashid Pasha viewed it as a stabilising force. As part of the Hauran's reorganization, a new administrative district, the Hauran Sanjak, was formed, which included Jabal Hauran, the Nuqrah and Jaydur plains, the Golan plateau, the hilly Balqa plain and Jabal Ajlun.

Rashid Pasha also pressed wealthier Syrians to take advantage of the 1858 Land Code and auctioned massive tracts of state land. From 1869, many Damascene merchants and landowners and entrepreneurial Haurani farmers invested in these lands, which increased agricultural production. With these investments came a reinforced military presence and a consequent reduction in Bedouin raids. These combined factors caused the peasantry to "feel themselves more protected and risk further settlement", according to German archaeologist Gottlieb Schumacher.

Into the 1870s and 1880s, the peasants of the Hauran, including the Druze, persisted in their agitation against the central government, European commercial interests and their own leaders. However, increased security in the plains as well as an end to Bedouin tribute collection were both largely secured and continued into the 20th century. To illustrate the extent of the Hauran's cultivation in the mid-1890s, Schumacher noted that "no hectare of good land was without its owner". The central plain had become entirely cultivated or settled, Daraa and Bosra grew significantly and many of the hamlets established or reestablished in the 1850s had become large villages. In 1891–95, Zionist organisations, helped by Baron Edmond de Rothschild, acquired 100,000 dunams of land in Saham al-Jawlan and established there a Jewish village, but in 1896 the authorities evicted the non-Ottoman Jewish families. In 1904, the annual Hajj caravan and Muzayrib's role in it was replaced by the construction of the Hejaz Railway.

=== French Mandatory period ===
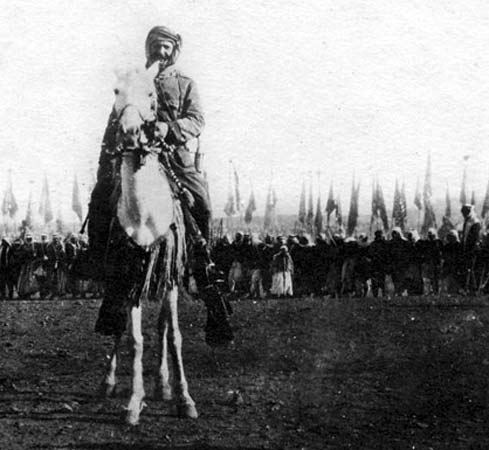
Druze rebels celebrating the release of their prisoners in the Hauran during the Great Syrian Revolt against French rule. The revolt began in Jabal Hauran under the leadership of Sultan Pasha al-Atrash

At the end of World War I, the Hauran was captured and held for about two years by the Arab army of Emir Faisal, until French forces occupied Damascus in July 1920 to enforce French Mandatory rule in Syria. A revolt broke out in the Hauran in response to the French occupation. Following the crushing of the Great Syrian Revolt, which began in the Hauran, the area experienced increased prosperity and security, as its inhabitants were now protected from incursions by Bedouin tribes. Under French Mandatory rule, the Hauran plains formed an eponymous district within the State of Damascus, while the Jabal Hauran formed the Jabal Druze State. Its total population was 83,000 and included 110 villages. Its principal population centers were the small towns of Daraa, Bosra, Izra and Nawa. The district was subdivided into two qadaat (subdistricts), the southern one centered in Daraa and the northern one in Izra.

=== Post-Syrian independence period ===
In the period following Syria's independence from France in 1946, the Hauran developed into "a busy and prosperous region", according to the historian Dominique Sourdel. It remained a significant source of the country's grain and point of transit between Syria and Jordan. It was often a place where Bedouin came to trade their wool and butter for other commodities. However, following World War II, the Hauran also lost much of its importance within Syria's national economy. Though it continues to supply grain to Damascus, its role as the 'granary of Syria' was eclipsed by the country's northern and northeastern regions. Grain production in the Hauran has been limited by dependence on rain and underground reservoirs. Moreover, the region's economic potential has been curtailed by the creation of international borders and the Arab–Israeli conflict, which have separated it from previously interdependent areas that are located today in Israel, Lebanon and Jordan. In particular, the dual loss of Palestine as an alternative market to Damascus, and of Haifa as the Hauran's main economic outlet to the Mediterranean Sea, have also contributed to its economic decline.

Unlike other rural regions in Syria, most land in the Hauran was not concentrated in the hands of large owners, being owned instead by small or medium-sized proprietors. Thus, the region was not as affected by the Agrarian Reform Law passed in 1958 during the United Arab Republic period (1958–1961) and enforced by the Ba'ath Party government in 1963, which effected land redistribution and mostly targeted large landowners. According to historian Hanna Batatu, parts of the Hauran, such as the area within and around Bosra, were practically self-governing during the presidency of Hafez al-Assad (1970–2000). Politically, many of the clans that dominated local politics under the French continued to do so under the Ba'ath. Economically and socially, however, the higher levels of leadership within the clans declined and lower-ranking members gradually became more influential.

During the presidency of Bashar al-Assad (2000–present), the Hauran remained an important agricultural region. Its principal city, Daraa, is a major transit hub for commercial traffic between Syria, Jordan, Saudi Arabia and Turkey, as well as for smuggled goods between these countries.

==== Syrian Civil War ====
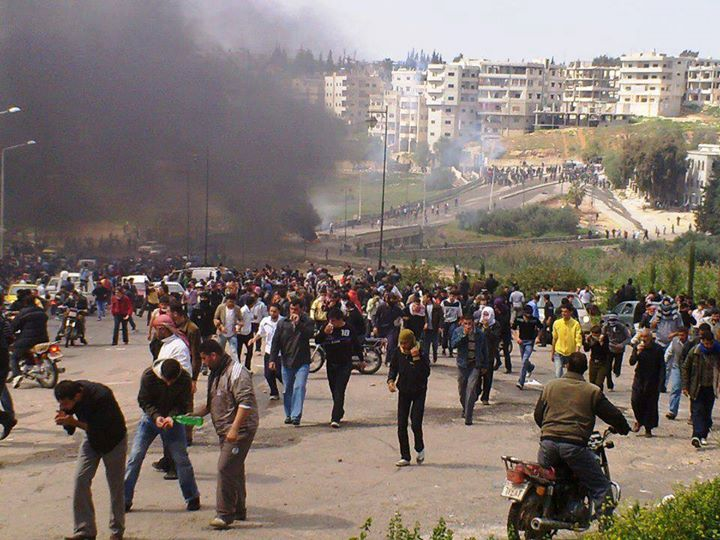
An anti-government protest in Daraa, 2013.

The Syrian Civil War was sparked in the Hauran town of Daraa on 6 March 2011 when anti-government demonstrations were organized in response to the detention and alleged torture of a group of teenagers by the local branch of the security forces. As the revolt spread in the Hauran, anti-government forces utilized their clan networks that extended to Jordan and Arab states of the Persian Gulf, smuggling funds and weapons to sustain the rebellion. According to historian Nicholas Heras, "the major tribes of Dar`a are reported to share common grievances... ...against the al-Assad government in Dar'a". During the course of the war, they formed loosely-coordinated rebel militias, fighting under the banner of the Free Syrian Army-affiliated Southern Front, which claimed it had the allegiance of some fifty armed groups with a collective strength of 30,000 fighters. Anti-government Salafist armed groups, such as the Nusra Front, also gained increasing influence, at times either challenging or cooperating with the Southern Front.

Until 2018, rebel groups controlled large areas on either side of the main north-south Damascus-Daraa highway and the Nasib border crossing, though the Syrian Army (SAA) and its affiliates controlled the highway corridor itself. Meanwhile, the pro-government Druze Muwahhidin Army largely stayed out of the fighting and secured Jabal al-Druze. In June 2018, the Syrian government launched an offensive to recapture the rebel-held areas of the Daraa and Quneitra governorates. By the end of the following month, the entire Hauran was under government control, including a pocket of territory in the Yarmouk basin that had previously been held by the Islamic State of Iraq and the Levant (ISIL). Although some rebels and their families opted to relocate to rebel-held Idlib, most rebel factions surrendered in reconciliation deals with the government and remained in their hometowns. A number of rebel groups also joined the Syrian Army offensive against ISIL.

== Demography ==
=== Religion ===
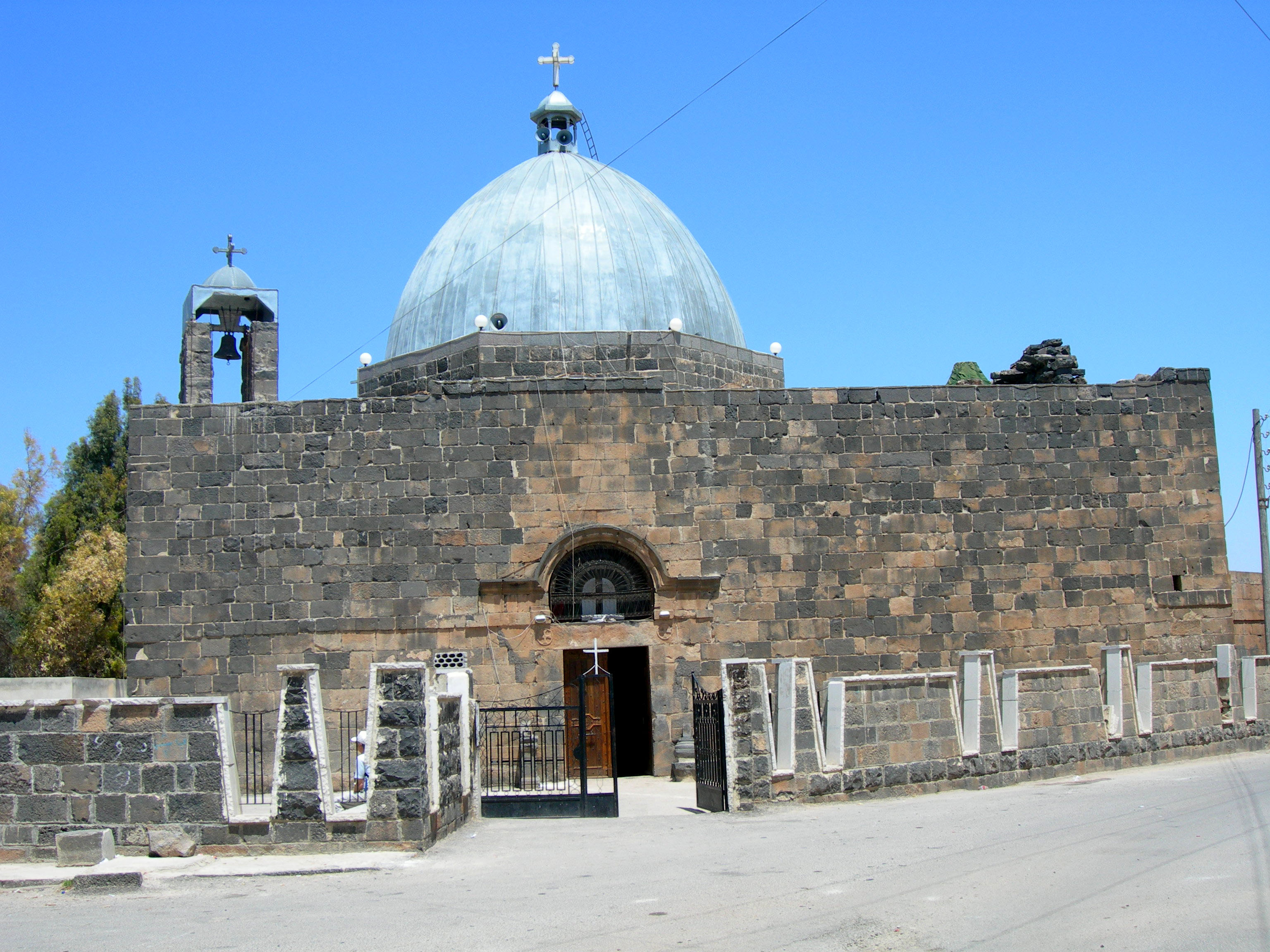
The Church of St. George in the city of Izra, which has a significant Christian community.

The population of the Hauran region is religiously heterogeneous. The largely agrarian Sunni Muslim Arabs form a majority in the Hauran plain in Syria and Jordan and are known as Ḥawarna (singular: Ḥawrānī). In addition to the indigenous Ḥawarna, the plains are also populated by communities of former Bedouin tribes who gradually became settled, and Circassians who began to arrive in the mid to late 19th century.

The Druze form a majority in the Jabal Hauran, which is part of the Suwayda Governorate. There is a significant Christian population, both Greek Orthodox and Greek Catholic (Melkite), in the Hauran region as a whole, though most Christians are concentrated in the towns and villages straddling the western foothills of Jabal Hauran. (Note: In the censuses of 1927, 1943 and 1956 Christians accounted for 9%–10% of the Jabal Druze State/Suwayda Governorate. In her survey in 1985, historian Robert Brenton Betts noted that this rate had likely declined and that many rural Christians had moved to Suwayda city, Damascus or outside of Syria. Localities in the Hauran with Christian pluralities or majorities include the city of Izra and the villages of Jubayb, Namer, Bassir and Tubna in the Daraa Governorate and Aslihah, Anz, Dara, Hit, Khabab, Kharaba, Sama al-Bardan in the Suwayda Governorate.) A sizable Twelver Shia Muslim community, whose origins are from the Lebanese city of Nabatieh, make up about 40% of Bosra's population.

=== Clan structure and geographic distribution ===
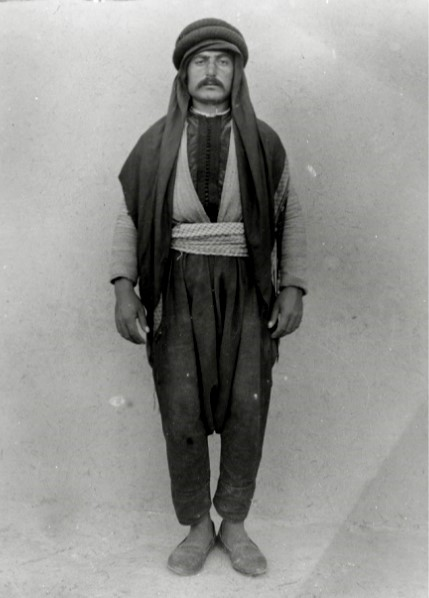
A Bedouin tribesman of the Na'imeh clan in the Hauran, 1895

The social structure of the Hauran plain is characterized by networks of large extended agrarian clans, such as the Hariri, Zu'bi, Miqdad, Abu Zeid, Mahamid, Masalma and Jawabra. The Zu'bi are the largest clan, inhabiting some sixteen villages in the Daraa and Izra districts. They also have an extensive presence across the border in the Irbid Governorate, particularly in the cities of al-Ramtha and Irbid. They form the predominant group in the city of Daraa and many of its surrounding villages. (Note: The localities of the Zu'bi clan include 'Ataman, Da'el, al-Jiza, Khirbet Ghazaleh, al-Musayfirah, Muzayrib, Nasib, al-Na'ima, Saida, al-Ta'iba, Tafas and al-Yadudah.) Altogether, they number some 160,000 members in southern Syria and northern Jordan.

The second largest clan are the Hariri, who generally inhabit eighteen villages, including many that are inhabited by the Zu'bi. They are mostly concentrated just north of Daraa in Abtaa, Da'el, and al-Shaykh Maskin. The Miqdad are predominant in many of the villages southwest of Daraa. (Note: The localities of the Miqdad clan include Ghasm, Ma'araba and Samaqiyat.) They are also the largest clan in the city of Bosra, but are predated there by the smaller al-Hamd clan. The tribesmen of Nu'aym (or Na'imeh) are predominant in the towns of al-Shaykh Maskin, Jasim and Nawa in the Izra District, the villages of north-central al-Sanamayn District and in the Quneitra Governorate. Smaller clans such as the Rifa'i are concentrated in Ataman and Nasib, while the Masalma, Mahamid and Abu Zeid are concentrated in Daraa city.

Among the settled Bedouin are many Anizah tribesmen who made Daraa their home alongside the city's established agrarian clans. In addition, members of the Shammar Arab tribe from northeastern Syria have migrated to the city, mainly for economic reasons.

Like the agrarian Sunni clans of the plains, the Druze in Jabal Hauran were traditionally organized in a hierarchical clan order that saw a disparity in the distribution of social influence and prestige. The Bani al-Atrash are the leading clan and predominate in some sixteen towns and villages, mostly in the southern parts of Jabal Hauran. (Note: The localities inhabited by the Bani al-Atrash include the cities of al-Suwayda and Salkhad, and the villages of al-Annat, Anz, Awas, Dhibin, al-Ghariyah, al-Huwayyah, Ira, Malah, al-Qurayya, Qaysama, Rasas, Umm al-Rumman and 'Urman.) In the northern parts, the Bani 'Amer predominate in eleven villages, (Note: The localities inhabited by the Bani ‘Amer include Shahba, Amrah, Braykah, al-Buthainah, al-Hayyat, al-Hit, Mardak, al-Matunah, al-Suwaymrah and Ta'lah.) while the other major clan in the northern Jabal Hauran was the Halabiya family. (Note: The Halabiya predominate in the Wadi al-Liwa area, including al-Hit, al-Sura and al-Tha'lah.) Though the Bani al-Atrash and Bani ‘Amer were the more powerful clans in the governorate, members of the Banu Assaf of Attil, Slaim and Walghah and Bani Abu Ras of al-Ruha historically dominated the judiciary, while the Hajari, Hinnawi and Jarbu families historically provided the Druze community's religious leadership in Qanawat.

== Architecture ==
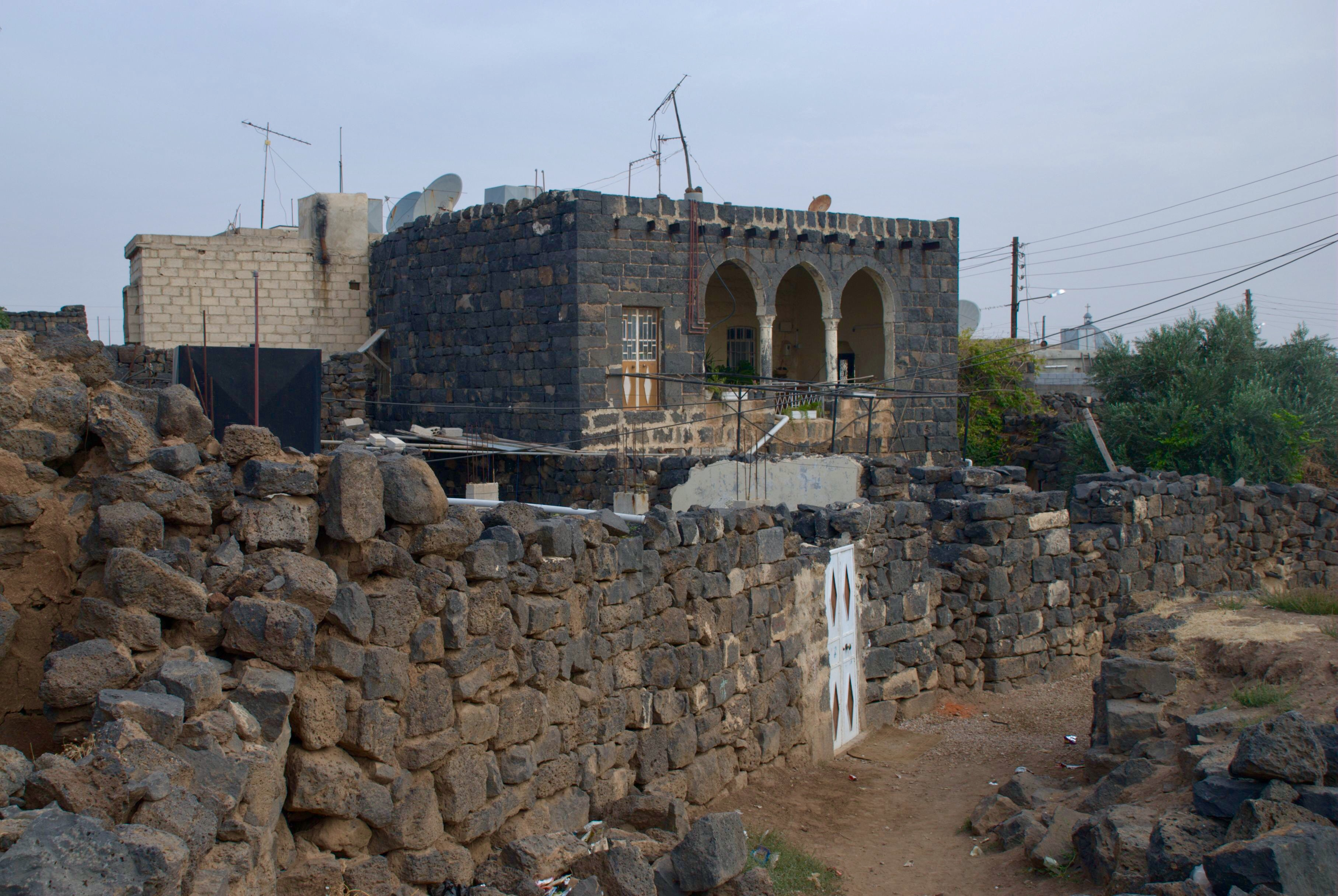
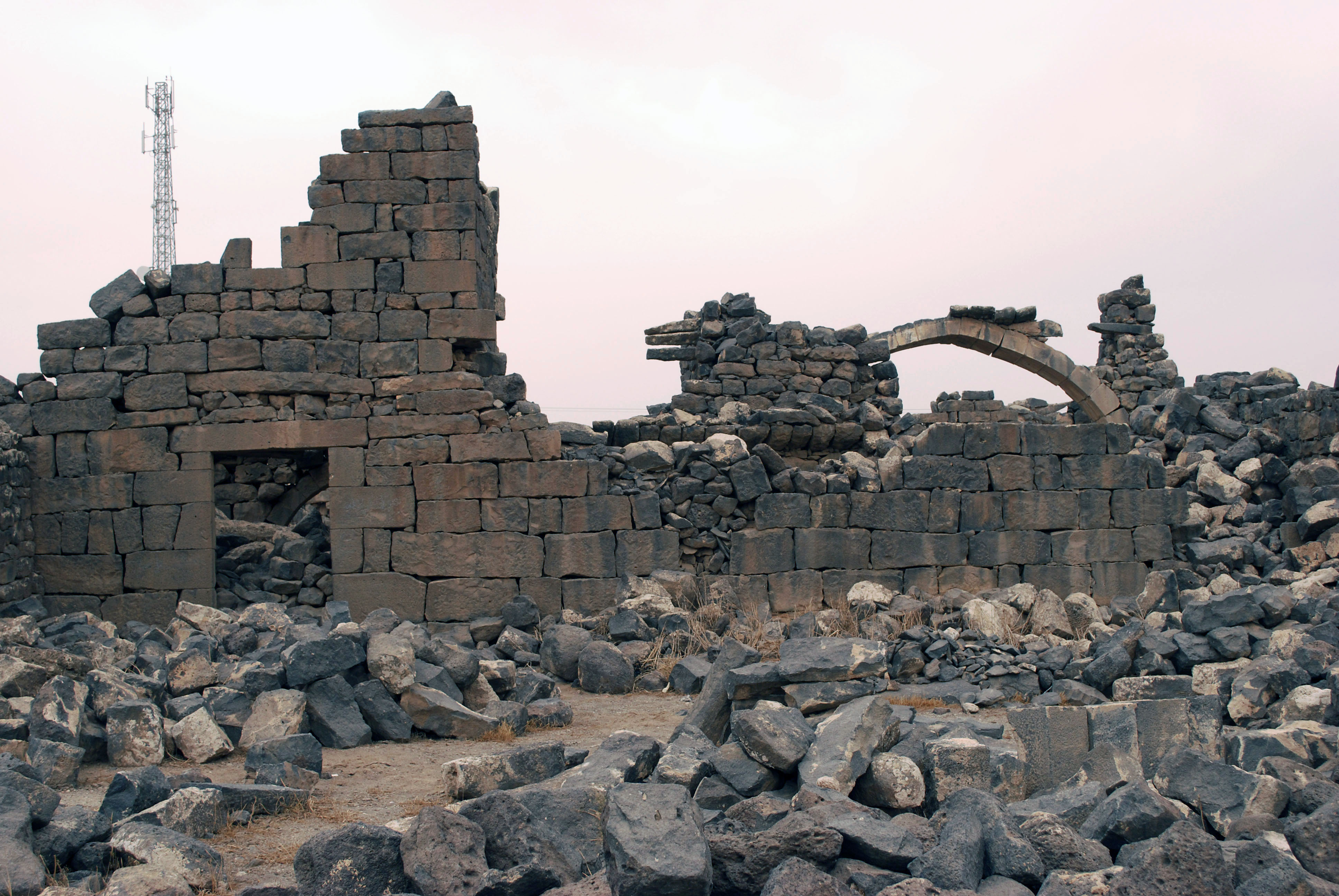
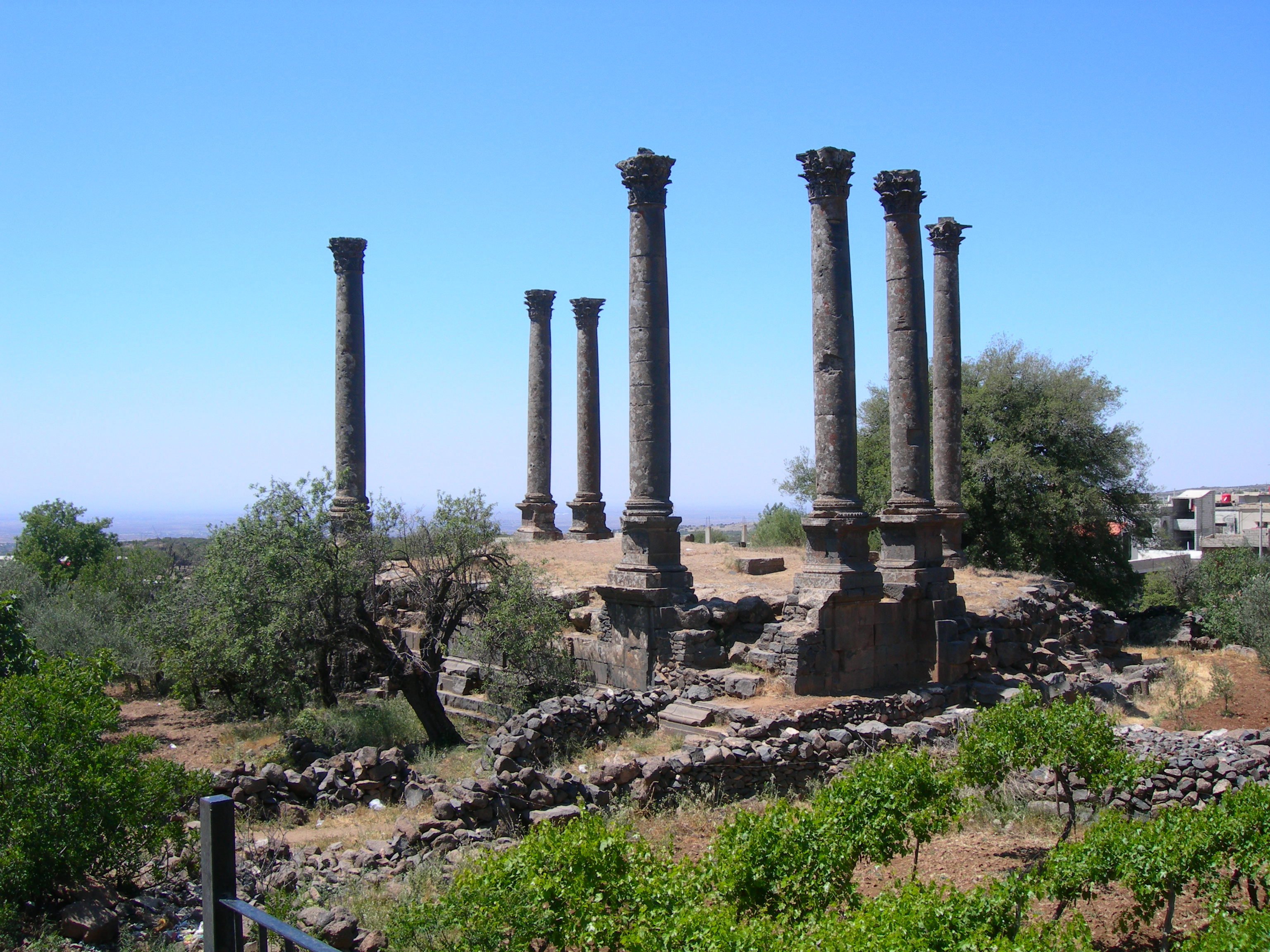
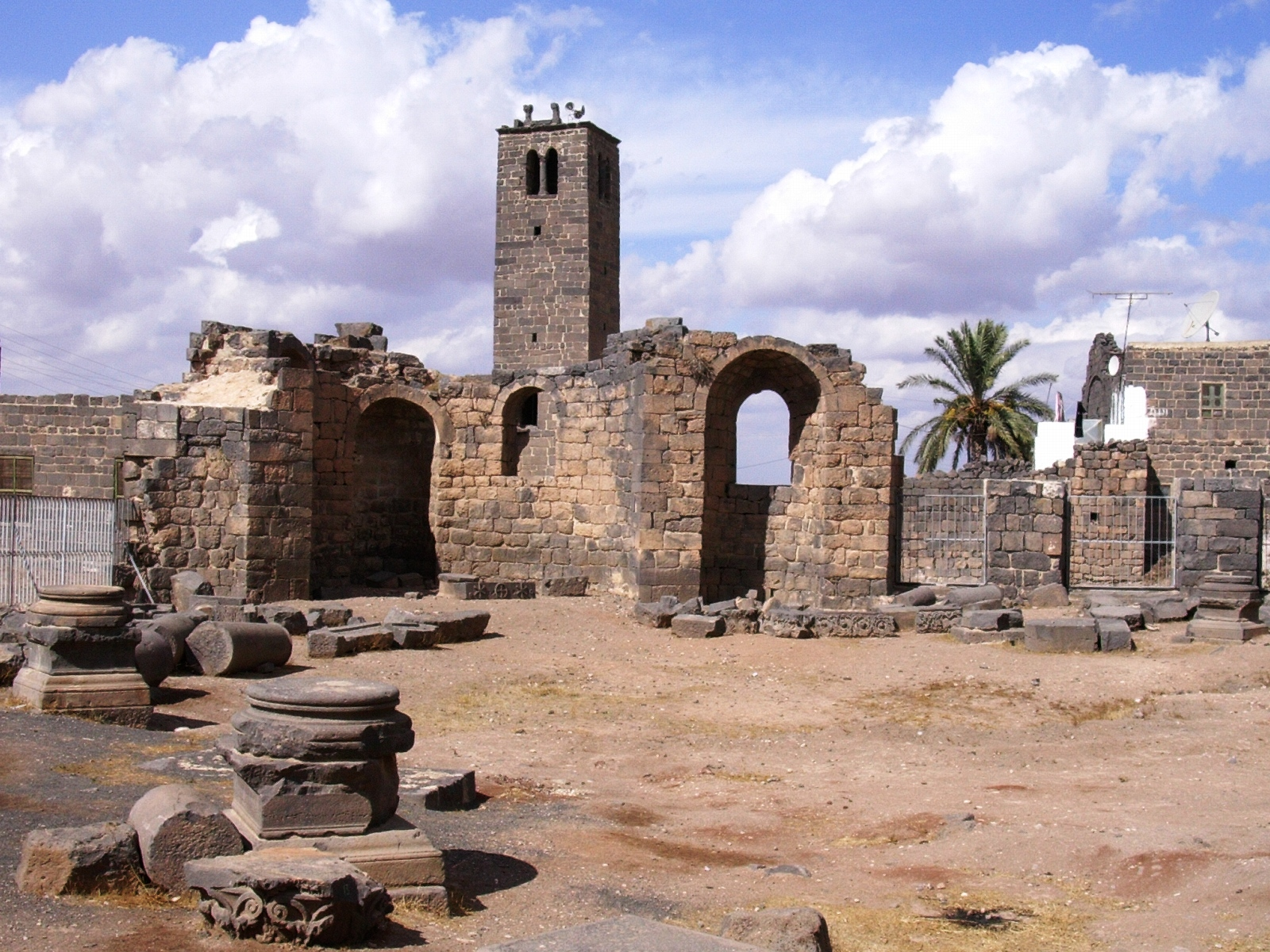
The exclusive use of basalt is characteristic of the Hauran's architecture. Examples shown above are (clockwise from the top left): (1) A traditional house in Izra; (2) Remains of a Nabatean-era structure in Umm al-Jimal; (3) The Mamluk-era Fatima Mosque in Bosra; (4) Ruins of the Roman-era Temple of Rabbos in Qanawat.

The Hauran has its own vernacular architectural tradition, known as the Hawrani style, which has distinctive characteristics. One of these is the exclusive use of basaltic stone as building material. Known for its hardness and black color, basalt is readily available throughout the region and until recent decades, was used for nearly all construction work done in the Hauran. Due to a lack of timber, basalt took the usual place of wood and was used for doors, window seals and ceilings. The reliance upon basalt in the Hauran "formed a truly lithic architecture“, according to the architectural anthropologist Fleming Aalund.

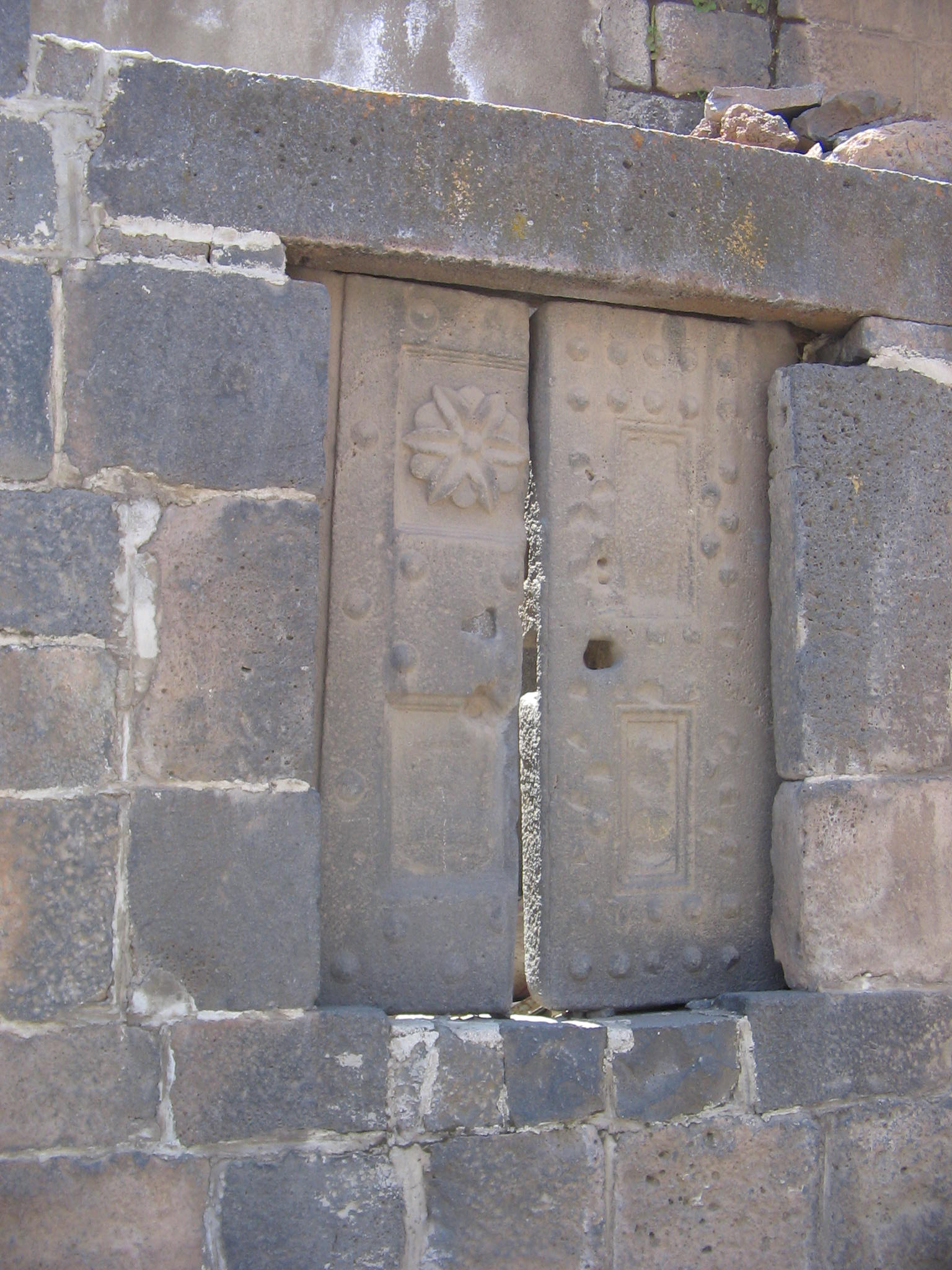
A window built of basalt in a structure in Qanawat

The tensile strength of basalt enabled the "development of unusual building techniques", according to historian Warwick Ball. Among these methods was the cutting of long, narrow beams from basalt to roof large areas spanning 10 meters (33 ft) or longer. Because of the size restrictions of the beams, a distinctive system of traverse, semi-circular arches was devised to support the roof. Corbels, typically no longer than 4 meters (13 ft), were used to expand the intervals between the arches and the walls. This method "gave rise to the distinctive, cantilevered 'slab and lintel' architectural style that is peculiar to the black basalt areas of the Hauran", according to Ball.

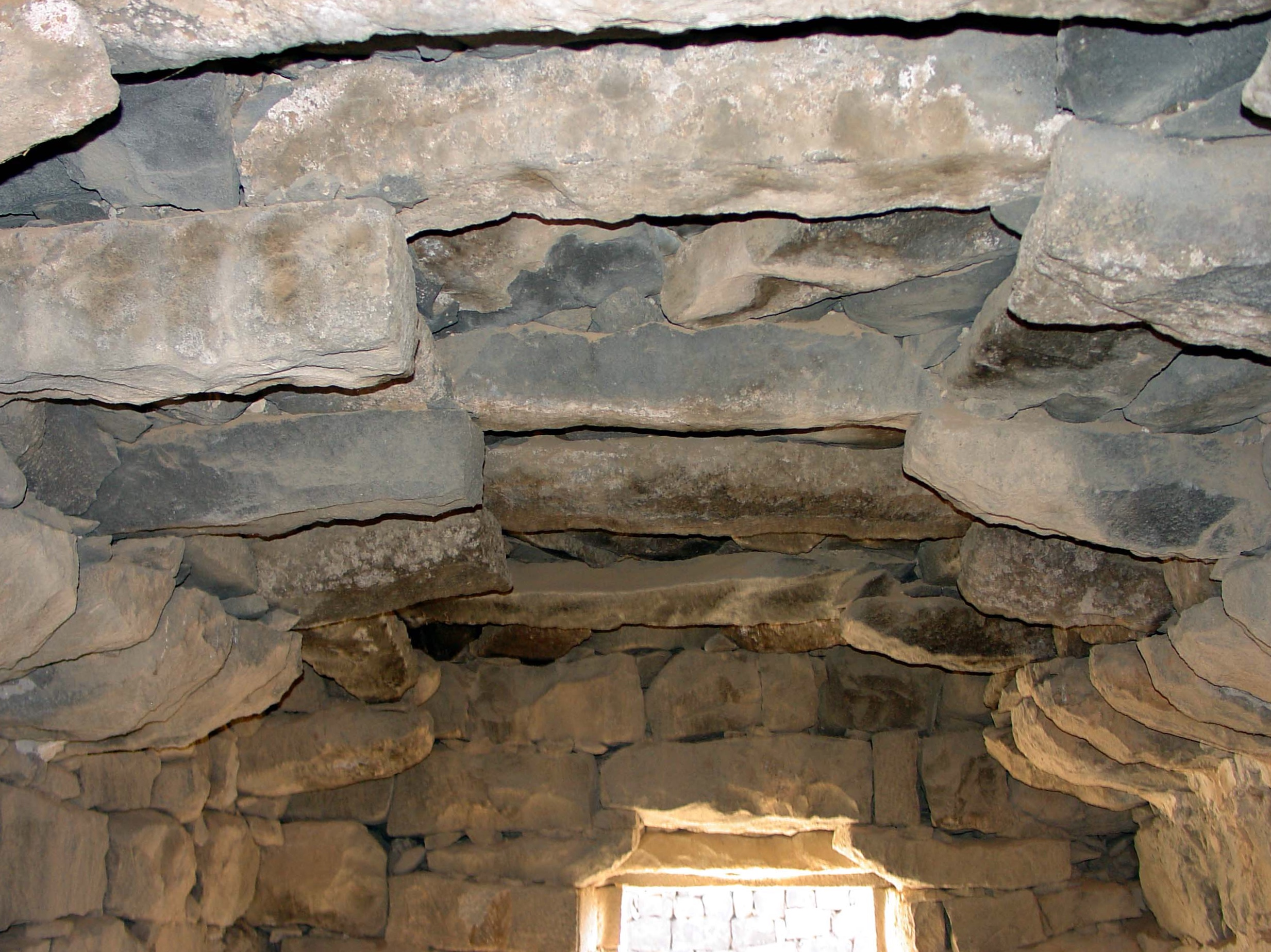
An example of Hauran architecture's 'slab and lintel' technique used for a ceiling in Umm al-Jamal

The fusion of Nabatean, Hellenistic and Roman styles also characterizes the architecture of the region. Hawrani-style architecture is dated to at least the 1st century AD, when the Nabateans moved their capital from Petra to Bosra. The Nabateans were avid builders who had their own distinctive architectural tradition. After the Romans annexed the Kingdom of the Nabateans in 106, the area experienced a building boom that lasted until the onset of strife and instability in the mid-3rd century. Though the Romans greatly influenced the region's architecture, the Hauran's Nabatean inhabitants largely maintained their own building traditions, particularly in the smaller towns.

The architecture of the Byzantine era was influenced by the spread of Christianity and the consequent construction of churches and monasteries, the majority dating between the 4th century and early 6th century. Surveys of the region indicated that a long period of uninterrupted building activity took place in the Hauran between the Nabatean period in the 1st century to the Umayyad period in the 7th century. The region's pre-Islamic architectural tradition became the basis for later Islamic buildings in the Hauran, particularly in Bosra in the 12th–14th centuries. However, the Muslim patrons of these works also introduced outside elements, mostly inspired by Damascene architecture, to give their projects their own stately character.

=== Archaeology ===
The Hauran is distinguished by the large-scale preservation of its ancient structures. This preservation extends to public and religious buildings, but also to simpler structures, such as village dwellings. The durability of basalt is generally credited with their well-preserved state. As a result, there are some 300 towns and villages in the Hauran containing ancient structures, almost as high a concentration as the Dead Cities of northwestern Syria. In the words of 20th-century archaeologist Howard Crosby Butler,

There is no other country in the world where the architectural monuments of antiquity have been preserved in such large numbers, in such perfection, and in so many varieties as in North Central Syria [the Dead Cities] and in the Hauran. There are many places where the minor details of buildings, such as wall-paintings and mosaics, are in a better state of preservation; but there is no [other] region where numbers of towns of undoubted antiquity stand unburied, and still preserving their public and private buildings and their tombs in such a condition that, in many cases, they could be restored, with a small outlay, to their original state.

When Classical-era sites were largely resettled in the late Ottoman era, many of the Hauran's ancient monuments were converted into houses.

=== Surveys ===
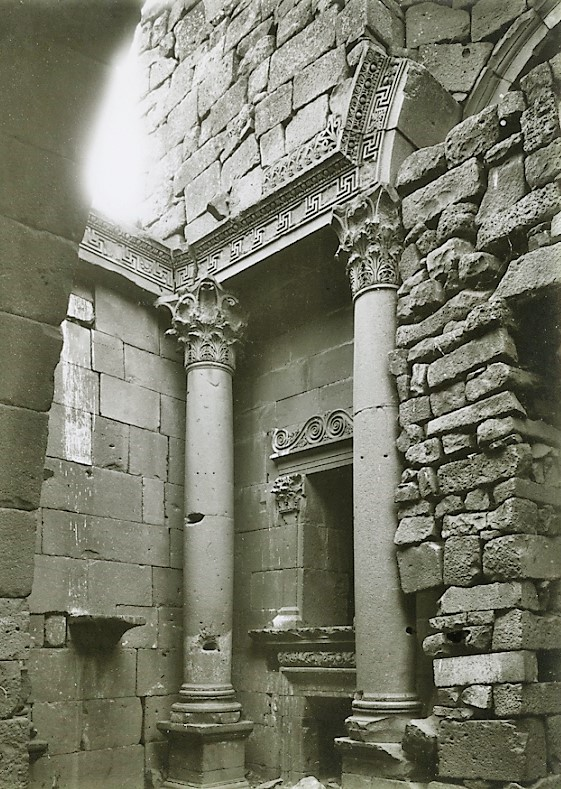
Ancient temple, al-Sanamayn, photographed by Hermann Burchardt in 1895

The earliest surveys of the Hauran's archaeological sites were taken in the 19th century by the French archaeologist Melchior de Vogüé between 1865 and 1877, S. Merrill in 1881 and Gottlieb Schumacher in 1886 and 1888. The most thorough and abundant documentation was recorded in surveys carried out by Butler and his team from Princeton University in 1903 and 1909 and then published periodically between 1909 and 1929. In 1913, Butler also surveyed Umm al-Jimal, which contained numerous ruins, some as high as three stories. The period in which these surveys were carried out coincided with the Hauran's mass resettlement. This resulted in the partial damage of some sites due to their occupation as homes or as a source of masonry for new buildings, a process which continuously increased in later years.

Renewed interest in the Hauran's ancient sites began in the 1970s. Umm al-Jimal was surveyed between 1972 and 1981 by the American archaeologist Bert de Vries and reports from that expedition were published in 1998. Surveys of the Hauran plain in Syria were carried out by French expeditionary teams led by François Villeneuve in 1985 and Jean-Marie Dentzer in 1986. Early photographs of Hauran's archaeological sites, taken in the late 19th and early 20th centuries by the German explorer and photographer Hermann Burchardt, are now held at the Ethnological Museum of Berlin. (Note: Examples of photographs of the Hauran taken by Burchardt in 1895 include: the castle (citadel) of Salkhad; Melach Es-Sarrar (Malah); Dibese, 400 metres (1,300 ft) west of Suwayda; Qasr (fortress) al-Mushannaf; The ruins of Khirbet al-Bayda; The citadel: decorated lintel, Khirbat al-Bayda)

== Bibliography ==
- Aalund, Flemming (1992). Vernacular Tradition and the Islamic Architecture of Bosra (PDF) (PhD). Copenhagen: The Royal Academy of Fine Arts School of Architecture.
- Abu-Husayn, Abdul-Rahim (1985). Provincial Leaderships in Syria, 1575–1650. Beirut: American University of Beirut. ISBN 9780815660729.
- Amabe, Fukuzo (2016). Urban Autonomy in Medieval Islam: Damascus, Aleppo, Cordoba, Toledo, Valencia and Tunis. Leiden: Brill. ISBN 9789004315983.
- Bakhit, Muhammad Adnan Salamah (February 1972). The Ottoman Province of Damascus in the Sixteenth Century (PhD). School of Oriental and African Studies, University of London. S2CID 190680221.
- Ball, W. (2016). Rome in the East: The Transformation of an Empire (2nd ed.). Abingdon: Routledge. ISBN 978-0-415-72078-6.
- Barakat, Nora Elizabeth (2023). Bedouin Bureaucrats: Mobility and Property in the Ottoman Empire (paperback ed.). Stanford: Stanford University Press. ISBN 9781503635623.
- Batatu, H. (1999). Syria's Peasantry, the Descendants of Its Lesser Rural Notables, and Their Politics. Princeton University Press. ISBN 0691002541.
- Betts, Robert Brenton (1988). The Druze. New Haven: Yale University Press. ISBN 0-300-04100-4.
- Bosworth, C.E. (1991). "Marwān I b. al-Ḥakam". In Bosworth, C.E.; van Donzel, E.; Pellat, Ch. (eds.). The Encyclopaedia of Islam, New Edition. Vol. VI: Mahk-Mid. Leiden: E.J. Brill. pp. 621–623. ISBN 90-04-08112-7.
- Brown, Robin M. (2009). "The Druze Experience at Umm al-Jimal: Remarks on the History and Archaeology of the Early 20th Century Settlement" (PDF). Studies in the History and Archaeology of Jordan. X. Amman.
- Butler, H.C. (1903). Architecture and other Arts. New York: Century Co.
- Cohen, Amnon (1973). Palestine in the 18th Century: Patterns of Government and Administration. Jerusalem: The Magnes Press. ISBN 978-0-19-647903-3.
- Firro, Kais (1992). A History of the Druzes. Vol. 1. BRILL. ISBN 9004094377.
- Gaube, H. (1986). "Ladjāʾ". In Bosworth, C.E.; van Donzel, E.; Pellat, Ch. (eds.). The Encyclopaedia of Islam, New Edition. Vol. V: Khe–Mahi. Leiden: E.J. Brill. p. 593. ISBN 90-04-07819-3.
- Hartal, Moshe (2006). Dar, Shimon; Hartal, Moshe; Ayalon, E. (eds.). Rafid on the Golan: A Profile of a Late Roman and Byzantine Village. British Archaeological Reports International Series 1555. Oxford: Archaeopress. ISBN 1841719846.(registration required)
- Heras, Nicholas A. (June 2014). "A Profile of Syria's Strategic Dar'a Province". CTC Sentinel. 7 (6). Combating Terrorism Center: 20–23.
- Hiyari, Mustafa A. (1975). "The Origins and Development of the Amīrate of the Arabs during the Seventh/Thirteenth and Eighth/Fourteenth Centuries". Bulletin of the School of Oriental and African Studies. 38 (3): 509–524. doi:10.1017/s0041977x00048060. JSTOR 613705. S2CID 178868071.
- Honigman, E. (1991). "Al-Nukra". In Bosworth, C.E.; van Donzel, E.; Pellat, Ch. (eds.). The Encyclopaedia of Islam, New Edition. Vol. VIII: Ned-Sam. Leiden: E.J. Brill. p. 114. ISBN 90-04-07819-3.
- Hütteroth, W.-D.; Abdulfattah, K. (1977). Historical Geography of Palestine, Transjordan and Southern Syria in the Late 16th Century. Erlanger Geographische Arbeiten, Sonderband 5. Erlangen, Germany: Vorstand der Fränkischen Geographischen Gesellschaft. ISBN 3-920405-41-2.
- King, G.R.D. (1989). "The Umayyad Qusur and Related Settlements in Jordan". In Bakhit, Muhammad Adnan; Schick, Robert (eds.). The Fourth International Conference on the History of Bilād al-Shām during the Umayyad Period: Proceedings of the Third Symposium, Volume 2. Amman: University of Jordan Press, Bilad al-Sham History Committee.
- Le Strange, G. (1890). Palestine Under the Moslems: A Description of Syria and the Holy Land from A.D. 650 to 1500. Committee of the Palestine Exploration Fund.
- Lewis, Norman (2000). "The Syrian Steppe during the Last Century of Ottoman Rule: Hawran and the Palmyrena". In Mundy, Martha; Musallam, Basim (eds.). The Transformation of Nomadic Society in the Arab East. Cambridge: Cambridge University Press. pp. 33–43. ISBN 0521770572.
- MacAdam, Henry Innes (2002). Geography, Urbanisation and Settlement Patterns in the Roman Near East. Abingdon: Ashgate Publishing. ISBN 978-1-138-74056-3.
- Ma'oz, Zvi Uri (2008). The Ghassānids and the Fall of the Golan Synagogues. Archaostyle.
- Meinecke, M. (1996). Patterns of Stylistic Changes in Islamic Architecture: Local Traditions versus Migrating Artists. New York: New York University Press. ISBN 0-8147-5492-9.(registration required)
- Rafeq, Abdul Karim (1966). The Province of Damascus, 1723–1783. Beirut: Khayats.
- Rapoport, Yossef (2025). Becoming Arab: The Formation of Arab Identity in the Medieval Middle East. Princeton: Princeton University Press. ISBN 9780691210636.
- Rogan, E. (1994). "Bringing the State Back: The Limits of Ottoman Rule in Transjordan, 1840–1910". In Rogan, Eugene L.; Tell, Tariq (eds.). Village, Steppe and State: The Social Origins of Modern Jordan. London: British Academic Press. ISBN 1-85043-829-3.
- Rohmer, Jérôme (September 2008). "Late Hellenistic Settlements in Hawrân (Southern Syria). Survival of Proto-historic Urbanism and Village Architecture in a Hellenized Context". Bollettino di Archeologia on Line. Ministry of Cultural Heritage and Activities.
- Runciman, S. (1951). A History of the Crusades, Volume II: The Kingdom of Jerusalem and the Frankish East, 1100-1187. Cambridge: Cambridge University of Press. ISBN 0521061628.
- Schilcher, L. Schatkowski (1981). "The Hauran Conflicts of the 1860s: A Chapter in the Rural History of Modern Syria". International Journal of Middle East Studies. 13 (2): 159–179. doi:10.1017/S0020743800055276. JSTOR 162818. S2CID 162263141. (registration required)
- Schilcher, L. Schatkowski (Fall 1991). "The Great Depression (1873-1896) and the Rise of Syrian Arab Nationalism". New Perspectives on Turkey. 6: 167–189. doi:10.15184/S089663460000039X. S2CID 146658083.
- Sourdel, D. (1971). "Ḥawrān". In Lewis, B.; Ménage, V.L.; Pellat, Ch.; Schacht, J. (eds.). The Encyclopaedia of Islam, New Edition. Vol. III: H–Iram. Leiden: E.J. Brill. pp. 292–293. ISBN 90-04-08118-6.
- Tritton, A. S. (1948). "The Tribes of Syria in the Fourteenth and Fifteenth Centuries". Bulletin of the School of Oriental and African Studies. 12 (3/4): 567–573. doi:10.1017/s0041977x00083129. JSTOR 608712. S2CID 161392172.
- Ward-Perkins, J.B. (1994). Roman Imperial Architecture. New Haven: Yale University Press. ISBN 0300052928.
- Wege, Carl Anthony (September 2015). "Urban And Rural Militia Organizations In Syria's Less Governed Spaces". Journal of Terrorism Research. 6 (3): 35. doi:10.15664/jtr.1123.
- Yusuf, Muhsin D. (1984). Economic Survey of Syria during the Tenth and Eleventh Centuries. Berlin: Klaus Schwarz. ISBN 3-922968-48-1.
- Zerbini, Andrea (2013). Society and Economy in Marginal Zones: A Study of the Levantine Agricultural Economy (1st-8th c. AD) (PDF) (Thesis). Department of Classics and Philosophy Royal Holloway, University of London.
- Ziadeh, Nicola A. (1970) [1953]. Urban Life In Syria Under the Early Mamluks. Greenwood Press. ISBN 9780837131627.
