= Nimreh =

Nimreh نمرة Nimra
- Village
- Location in Syria
- Coordinates: 32.824648°N 36.707811°E
- Country: Syria
- Governorate: Suwayda
- District: Shahba
- Subdistrict: Shahba

Population (2004 census)
  - Total: 4,376
- Time zone: UTC+2 (EET)
  - Summer (DST): UTC+3 (EEST)

Nimreh (Arabic: نمرة, also called Nimra) is a village in southern Syria, administratively part of the Suwayda Governorate, located northeast of Suwayda. It is situated on the northern end of Jabal al-Arab. Nearby localities include Shaqqa, Hit and al-Junaynah to the north, Shahba, Slaim and Murdok to the west and Mafaalah and Qanawat to the southwest. According to the Syria Central Bureau of Statistics (CBS), Nimreh had a population of 4,376 in the 2004 census. Its inhabitants are predominantly Druze.

== History ==
In 1838 Eli Smith noted Nimreh as being located in Hauran Sanjak, and inhabited by Druze and Antiochian Greek Christians.

== Religious buildings ==
- Maqam Umm Jadoukh (Druze Shrine)

== See also ==
- Druze in Syria

== Bibliography ==
- Betts, Robert Brenton (2010). The Druze. Yale University Press. ISBN 978-0300048100.
- Firro, Kais (1992). A History of the Druzes. Vol. 1. BRILL. ISBN 9004094377.
- Fowden, Elizabeth Key (1999). The Barbarian Plain: Saint Sergius between Rome and Iran. University of California Press. ISBN 0520216857.
- Myers, E. A. (2010). The Ituraeans and the Roman Near East: Reassessing the Sources. Cambridge University Press. ISBN 978-0521518871.
- Porter, Josias Leslie (1858). A Handbook for Travellers in Syria and Palestine. Vol. 1. Murray.
- Robinson, E.; Smith, E. (1841). Biblical Researches in Palestine, Mount Sinai and Arabia Petraea: A Journal of Travels in the year 1838. Vol. 3. Boston: Crocker & Brewster.
- Russel, Francis (2011). Places in Syria: A Pocket Grand Tour. Frances Lincoln Ltd. ISBN 978-0711231665.
- Sivertsev, Alexei (2002). Private Households and Public Politics in 3rd-5th Century Jewish Palestine. Mohr Siebeck. ISBN 3161477804.
