= Hit, Suwayda =

Hit الهيت Heet
- Village
- Location in Syria
- Coordinates: 32°55′35″N 36°40′27″E
- Country: Syria
- Governorate: Suwayda
- District: Shahba
- Subdistrict: Shaqqa

Population (2004)
  - Total: 655
- Time zone: UTC+2 (EET)
  - Summer (DST): UTC+3 (EEST)

Hit (Arabic: الهيت, also spelled Heet or al-Hit) is a village in southern Syria, administratively part of the Suwayda Governorate, located northeast of Suwayda. It is situated on the northern end of Jabal al-Druze. Nearby localities include Shaqqa to the south, Umm al-Zaytoun and Amrah to the southwest, al-Hayyat to the north and al-Buthainah to the east. According to the Syria Central Bureau of Statistics (CBS), Hit had a population of 655 in the 2004 census. The inhabitants are mostly Druze and Christians.

== History and archaeology ==
Hit is identified with the ancient city of Eitha. During Herodian rule, it served as the principal military base for the volcanic Lejah region. Ruins in Hit dating from the Roman period include a two-floor villa and a large reservoir. An inscription dating to 232 CE found in Hit reveals that during that time a strategos ("local chief, quasi-royal official") administered the town. Sometime during the years 354 and 355 CE, the Byzantine deacon of the area, Sabinianos, constructed a church in Eitha dedicated to Sergius in honor of his death in the early 4th century. The church, which had been part of a monastery, was one of the earliest sanctuaries to be dedicated to a Christian saint at a place other than the site of the saint's martyrdom.

=== Ottoman era ===
In 1838 Hit was noted by Eli Smith as being located in Jabal Hauran, and inhabited by Catholics.

According to Western traveler Josias Leslie Porter, Hit once had a population of about 10,000, but in the 1850s it was down to several hundred inhabitants. He further noted that most of the village was covered with ancient ruins and most of the inhabited houses were also ancient. A temple dedicated to the pagan deity Jupiter, a fountain built by a Roman official named Aelius Mazimos and another fountain dating to 120 CE were found in Hit. In 1862, during the late Ottoman era in Syria, the Druze Bani Amer clan controlled Hit along with seven other villages in the area. During an uprising by peasants in Jabal al-Arab, Hit's inhabitants revolted against the sheikhs ("chiefs") of the Bani Amer clan.

=== Modern era ===
In 1927, under French Mandate rule, Hit was a rural village that had a Christian majority of 284 persons, and a Druze minority of 182. It was the only village in Jabal al-Druze proper with a mostly Christian population.

== Religious buildings ==
- Our Lady of the Annunciation Melkite Greek Catholic Church
- St. Francis of Assisi Melkite Greek Catholic Church (Cemetery Church)

== See also ==
- Druze in Syria
- Christians in Syria

== Bibliography ==
- Betts, Robert Brenton (2010). The Druze. Yale University Press. ISBN 978-0300048100.
- Firro, Kais (1992). A History of the Druzes. Vol. 1. BRILL. ISBN 9004094377.
- Fowden, Elizabeth Key (1999). The Barbarian Plain: Saint Sergius between Rome and Iran. University of California Press. ISBN 0520216857.
- Myers, E. A. (2010). The Ituraeans and the Roman Near East: Reassessing the Sources. Cambridge University Press. ISBN 978-0521518871.
- Porter, J.L. (1858). A Handbook for Travellers in Syria and Palestine. Vol. 1. Murray.
- Robinson, E.; Smith, E. (1841). Biblical Researches in Palestine, Mount Sinai and Arabia Petraea: A Journal of Travels in the year 1838. Vol. 3. Boston: Crocker & Brewster.
- Russel, Francis (2011). Places in Syria: A Pocket Grand Tour. Frances Lincoln Ltd. ISBN 978-0711231665.
- Sivertsev, Alexei (2002). Private Households and Public Politics in 3rd-5th Century Jewish Palestine. Mohr Siebeck. ISBN 3161477804.
