= Mafaalah =

Mafaalah مفعلة
- Village
- Location within Syria
- Coordinates: 32°46′18″N 36°38′41″E
- Grid position: 304/242
- Country: Syria
- Governorate: Suwayda
- District: Suwayda
- Subdistrict: Suwayda

Population (2004 census)
  - Total: 4,168
- Time zone: UTC+2 (EET)
  - Summer (DST): UTC+3 (EEST)

Mafaalah (Arabic: مفعلة, also spelled Mafaala) is a village in southern Syria, administratively part of the Suwayda District of the Suwayda Governorate. According to the 2004 census, it had a population of 4,168. Its inhabitants are predominantly Druze.

== History ==
In 1838, Eli Smith noted that the inhabitants of Mef'aleh in Jebel Hauran were predominantly Druse.

== Religious buildings ==
- Maqam al-Masih (Druze Shrine)
- Maqam on Tal Hamra

== See also ==
- Druze in Syria

== Bibliography ==
- Robinson, E.; Smith, E. (1841). Biblical Researches in Palestine, Mount Sinai and Arabia Petraea: A Journal of Travels in the year 1838. Vol. 3. Boston: Crocker & Brewster.
