= Braykah =

Braykah بريكة Breikah
- Village
- Location within Syria
- Coordinates: 32°50′18″N 36°34′05″E
- PAL: 297/250
- Country: Syria
- Governorate: Suwayda
- District: Shahba
- Subdistrict: Shahba

Population (2004 census)
  - Total: 1,055
- Time zone: UTC+2 (EET)
  - Summer (DST): UTC+3 (EEST)

Braykah (Arabic: بريكة) is a village situated in the Shahba District of Suwayda Governorate, in southern Syria. According to the Syria Central Bureau of Statistics (CBS), Braykah had a population of 1,055 in the 2004 census. Its inhabitants are predominantly Druze, with a Sunni Muslim Bedouin minority.

== History ==
Braykah is identified with the ancient village of Borechath Sabaon, which is attested in inscriptions found in the Roman-era sanctuary of Aumos, a local sun god, located a few kilometers away at Dayr al-Laban. An individual from the village attested in these inscriptions is recorded as belonging to the tribe of the Audenoi, which is also attested in the nearby Mardocha.

In 1596 the village appeared in the Ottoman tax registers named Burayka, part of the nahiya (Subdistrict) of Bani Nasiyya in the Hauran Sanjak. It had a Muslim population consisting of 6 households and 3 bachelors; a total of 9 taxable units. They paid a fixed tax-rate of 40% on agricultural products, including wheat (1500 a.), barley (900 a.), summer crops (900 a.), goats and beehives (200 a.); a total of 3,500 akçe.

In 1838, Eli Smith noted that inhabitants of Bureikeh were predominantly Druse and Catholic and "Greek" Christians.

== Archaeology ==
Braykah is home to a Roman temple that was surveyed in 1904 by archaeologist Howard Crosby Butler. The temple, which had been dismantled and rebuilt by the time of Butler's survey, still contained a significant portion of its architectural elements in situ, allowing for a reliable reconstruction.

The temple stands on a rectangular podium and is of the tetrastylos prostyle type, featuring four columns across the front and a single hall. It measures approximately 8.50 × 9.65 meters and is distinguished by its Ionic columns and Syrian pediment, with semicircular niches and engaged half-columns flanking the entrance. The temple's construction and style suggest a date in the early 3rd century CE.

== Religious buildings ==
- Maqam al-Khidr (Druze Shrine)

== See also ==
- Druze in Syria

== Bibliography ==
- Hütteroth, W.-D.; Abdulfattah, K. (1977). Historical Geography of Palestine, Transjordan and Southern Syria in the Late 16th Century. Erlanger Geographische Arbeiten, Sonderband 5. Erlangen, Germany: Vorstand der Fränkischen Geographischen Gesellschaft. ISBN 3-920405-41-2.
- Robinson, E.; Smith, E. (1841). Biblical Researches in Palestine, Mount Sinai and Arabia Petraea: A Journal of Travels in the year 1838. Vol. 3. Boston: Crocker & Brewster.
