= Jubayb =

Jubayb جبيب Jbaib, Jbeb, Jbib
- Village
- Location within Syria
- Coordinates: 32°37′25″N 36°25′40″E
- PAL: 284/226
- Country: Syria
- Governorate: Suwayda
- District: Suwayda
- Subdistrict: Suwayda

Population (2004 census)
  - Total: 253
- Time zone: UTC+2 (EET)
  - Summer (DST): UTC+3 (EEST)

Jubayb (Arabic: جبيب) is a village in southern Syria, administratively part of the Suwayda District of the Suwayda Governorate. According to the 2004 census, Jubayb had a population of 253. Its inhabitants are predominantly Christians, with a Sunni Muslim minority.

== History ==
In 1596 it appeared in the Ottoman tax registers under the name of Jib, being part of the nahiya of Butayna in the Qadaa Hauran. It had an entirely Muslim population consisting of 15 households and 5 bachelors. They paid a fixed tax-rate of 40% on agricultural products, including wheat (1500 a.), barley (450 a.), summer crops (10 a.), goats and bee-hives (560 a.), winter pastures (600 a.), in addition to "occasional revenues" (600 a.); a total of 3,720 akçe. 1/6 of this was waqf income.

== Demographics ==
According to statistics from 1927, Jubayb had a population consisting of a Christian majority of 407 inhabitants and a Sunni Muslim minority of 26.

In 2011, the Melkite Greek Catholic Church had approximately 150 believers.

== Religious buildings ==
- The Saviour/Transfiguration Greek Orthodox Church
- St. Nicholas Melkite Greek Catholic Church
- Khalid ibn al-Walid Mosque

== See also ==
- Christians in Syria

== Bibliography ==
- Hütteroth, W.-D.; Abdulfattah, K. (1977). Historical Geography of Palestine, Transjordan and Southern Syria in the Late 16th Century. Erlanger Geographische Arbeiten, Sonderband 5. Erlangen, Germany: Vorstand der Fränkischen Geographischen Gesellschaft. ISBN 3-920405-41-2.
