= Al-Junaynah, Suwayda =

Al-Junaynah الجنينة
- Village
- Location within Syria
- Coordinates: 32°54′04″N 36°44′23″E
- PAL: 313/257
- Country: Syria
- Governorate: Suwayda
- District: Shahba
- Subdistrict: Shaqqa

Population (2004 census)
  - Total: 2,580
- Time zone: UTC+2 (EET)
  - Summer (DST): UTC+3 (EEST)

Al-Junaynah (Arabic: الجنينة) is a village situated in the Shahba District of Suwayda Governorate, in southern Syria. According to the Syria Central Bureau of Statistics (CBS), Al-Junaynah had a population of 2,580 in the 2004 census. Its inhabitants are predominantly Druze.

== History ==
In 1838, Eli Smith noted that inhabitants of el-Juneineh in Jebel Hauran were predominantly Druse.

== Religious buildings ==
- Maqam Yahya/John (Druze Shrine)

== See also ==
- Druze in Syria

== Bibliography ==
- Robinson, E.; Smith, E. (1841). Biblical Researches in Palestine, Mount Sinai and Arabia Petraea: A Journal of Travels in the year 1838. Vol. 3. Boston: Crocker & Brewster.
