= Qaysamma =

Qaysamma قيصما
- Village
- Location within Syria
- Coordinates: 32°32′03″N 36°50′23″E
- PAL: 322/216
- Country: Syria
- Governorate: Suwayda
- District: Salkhad
- Subdistrict: Malah

Population (2004 census)
  - Total: 1,178
- Time zone: UTC+2 (EET)
  - Summer (DST): UTC+3 (EEST)

Qaysamma (Arabic: قيصما) is a village situated in the Salkhad District of Suwayda Governorate, in southern Syria. According to the Syria Central Bureau of Statistics (CBS), Qaysamma had a population of 1,178 in the 2004 census. Its inhabitants are predominantly Druze.

== History ==
In 1596 Qaysamma appeared in the Ottoman tax registers as Qaysama, as part of the nahiya of Bani Malik as-Sadir in the Qada Hauran. It had an all Muslim population consisting of 10 households and 2 bachelors. The villagers paid a fixed tax rate of 20% on wheat, a total of 3,900 akçe.

== Religious buildings ==
- Maqam Prophet Shuaib (Druze Shrine)

== See also ==
- Druze in Syria

== Bibliography ==
- Hütteroth, W.-D.; Abdulfattah, K. (1977). Historical Geography of Palestine, Transjordan and Southern Syria in the Late 16th Century. Erlanger Geographische Arbeiten, Sonderband 5. Erlangen, Germany: Vorstand der Fränkischen Geographischen Gesellschaft. ISBN 3-920405-41-2.
