= Al-Matunah =

Al-Matunah المتونة Al-Metunah
- Village
- Location within Syria
- Coordinates: 32°56′59″N 36°36′10″E
- Country: Syria
- Governorate: Suwayda
- District: Shahba
- Subdistrict: Shahba

Population (2004 census)
  - Total: 1,366
- Time zone: UTC+2 (EET)
  - Summer (DST): UTC+3 (EEST)

Al-Matunah (Arabic: المتونة) is a village situated in the Shahba District of Suwayda Governorate, in southern Syria. According to the Syria Central Bureau of Statistics (CBS), Al-Matunah had a population of 1,366 in the 2004 census. Its inhabitants are predominantly Druze.

== History ==
In 1838, el-Metuny was noted as a ruin, situated "in the Luhf, east of the Lejah, i.e. in Wady el-Liwa".

== See also ==
- Druze in Syria

== Bibliography ==
- Robinson, E.; Smith, E. (1841). Biblical Researches in Palestine, Mount Sinai and Arabia Petraea: A Journal of Travels in the year 1838. Vol. 3. Boston: Crocker & Brewster.
