= Al-Buthainah =

Al-Buthainah البثينة Bteineh
- Village
- Location within Syria
- Coordinates: 32°57′08″N 36°41′48″E
- Country: Syria
- Governorate: Suwayda
- District: Shahba
- Subdistrict: Shaqqa

Population (2004 census)
  - Total: 1,151
- Time zone: UTC+2 (EET)
  - Summer (DST): UTC+3 (EEST)

Al-Buthainah (Arabic: البثينة), also spelled Bteineh, is a village situated in the Shahba District of Suwayda Governorate, in southern Syria. According to the Syria Central Bureau of Statistics (CBS), Al-Buthainah had a population of 1,151 in the 2004 census. Its inhabitants are predominantly Druze.

== Archaeology ==
Two Greek-language inscriptions are known from the village. One, of unspecified provenance, preserves only a dedication to Zeus Kyrios. Another, recorded in the 19th century after being reused in a courtyard wall, commemorates the construction of a Tychaion (a shrine dedicated to the Greek goddess of fortune, Tyche) by individuals named Ausos, Theodoros, Onenos, Anamos, and Zobedos using funds from the village.

== Religious buildings ==
- Maqam al-Ajami (Druze Shrine)

== See also ==
- Druze in Syria
