= Murdok =

Murdok مردك
- Village
- Location within Syria
- Coordinates: 32°49′37″N 36°35′58″E
- PAL: 300/249
- Country: Syria
- Governorate: Suwayda
- District: Shahba
- Subdistrict: Shahba

Population (2004 census)
  - Total: 2,891
- Time zone: UTC+2 (EET)
  - Summer (DST): UTC+3 (EEST)

Murdok (Arabic: مردك) is a village situated in the Shahba District of Suwayda Governorate, in southern Syria. According to the Syria Central Bureau of Statistics (CBS), Murdok had a population of 2,891 in the 2004 census. Its inhabitants are predominantly Druze.

== History ==
Murdok is identified with the ancient village of Mardocha, which is attested in inscriptions found in the Roman-era sanctuary of Aumos, a local sun god, located a few kilometers away at Dayr al-Laban. An individual from Mardocha attested in these inscriptions is recorded as belonging to the tribe of the Audenoi, which is also attested in the nearby Borechath Sabaon.

In 1596 the village appeared in the Ottoman tax registers named Mardak, part of the nahiya (Subdistrict) of Bani Nasiyya in the Hauran Sanjak. It had a Muslim population consisting of 23 households and 4 bachelors; a total of 27 taxable units. They paid a fixed tax-rate of 20% on agricultural products, including wheat (4500 a.), barley (900 a.), summer crops (600 a.), goats and beehives (250 a.), in addition to "occasional revenues" (150 a.); a total of 6,300 akçe.

In 1838, Eli Smith noted that inhabitants of Murduk were predominantly Druse and Christians.

== Religious buildings ==
- Al-Mahdi (Druze Shrine)

== See also ==
- Druze in Syria

== Bibliography ==
- Hütteroth, W.-D.; Abdulfattah, K. (1977). Historical Geography of Palestine, Transjordan and Southern Syria in the Late 16th Century. Erlanger Geographische Arbeiten, Sonderband 5. Erlangen, Germany: Vorstand der Fränkischen Geographischen Gesellschaft. ISBN 3-920405-41-2.
- Robinson, E.; Smith, E. (1841). Biblical Researches in Palestine, Mount Sinai and Arabia Petraea: A Journal of Travels in the year 1838. Vol. 3. Boston: Crocker & Brewster.
