= Al-Hayyat =

Al-Hayyat الهيات
- Village
- Location within Syria
- Coordinates: 32°56′22″N 36°39′22″E
- Country: Syria
- Governorate: Suwayda
- District: Shahba
- Subdistrict: Shaqqa

Population (2004 census)
  - Total: 1,176
- Time zone: UTC+2 (EET)
  - Summer (DST): UTC+3 (EEST)

Al-Hayyat (Arabic: الهيات) is a village situated in the Shahba District of Suwayda Governorate, in southern Syria. According to the Syria Central Bureau of Statistics (CBS), Al-Hayyat had a population of 1,176 in the 2004 census. Its inhabitants are predominantly Druze.

== Archaeology ==
A reused lintel found in the inner wall of a local barn bears an inscription recording the construction of a Tychaion (a shrine dedicated to Tyche, goddess of fortune).

== See also ==
- Druze in Syria
