= Raji Falhout group =

Pro-Assad group

Raji Falhout group Dawn Forces Atil group
- Leader: Raji Falhout
- Dates active: 2015–2025
- Headquarters: Slaim, Syria; Attil, Syria
- Active regions: Al-Suwayda Governorate, Syria
- Size: 30
- Wars: Syrian civil war

The Raji Falhout group, named after its leader, Raji Falhout, was a government-aligned faction in Syria that was dissolved during the Syrian civil war.

== History ==
The group was established in 2015 with the support of Military Intelligence.

There were clashes between the Raji Falhout group and other groups, following the seizure of a seller and a university student in September 2021, in an attempt by the Raji Falhout group to force the release of a member of Military Intelligence who had been taken by the Anti-Terrorism Force (ATF). A member of the Falhout group was captured by the ATF and his confession was aired on Facebook. Members of the group clashed with the Men of Dignity in Suwayda and Attil that same month.

The Raji Falhout group kidnapped university students from the town of Shahba on 26 July 2022. They were arrested and charged with being members of the Syrian Brigade Party and were all members of the Tawil family. Members of the family took four hostages of their own. The Falhout group's headquarters in Slaim was taken over in response. Anti-government fighters additionally took control of the groups headquarters in Attil, where the student hostages were found and freed. The Men of Dignity were one of the groups involved in the takeover, as well as the Al-Jabal Brigade. 13 fighters were reported killed, including nine fighters from Falhout group and four anti-government fighters, according to the Syrian Observatory for Human Rights. The total number of dead increased to ten government loyalists and seven opposition fighters, with 40 wounded by the next day.

The group was allied with the Al-Fahd Forces.

After numerous Raji Falhout group prisoners were tortured and killed by unknown persons, Laith al-Balous, a Druze leader, announced the release of six prisoners. His group also participated in the raids on the Falhout group headquarters in Slaim and Attil.

A group led by Laith al-Balous, as well as the Al-Jabal Brigade and the ATF, raided Qanawat in August 2022, pursuing members of the Raji Falhout group and Salim Humeid's Al-Fahd Forces.
