= Waqm =

Waqm وقم Waqem, Waqim
- Village
- Location within Syria
- Coordinates: 32°57′08″N 36°29′04″E
- PAL: 289/262
- Country: Syria
- Governorate: Suwayda
- District: Shahba
- Subdistrict: Ariqah

Population (2004 census)
  - Total: 429
- Time zone: UTC+2 (EET)
  - Summer (DST): UTC+3 (EEST)

Waqm (Arabic: وقم) is a village situated in the Shahba District of Suwayda Governorate, in southern Syria. According to the Syria Central Bureau of Statistics (CBS), Waqm had a population of 429 in the 2004 census. Its inhabitants are predominantly Druze, with a Sunni Muslim Bedouin minority.

== History ==
In 1838, it was noted as a ruin, Wukm, situated "in the Lejah, east of Dama".

== See also ==
- Druze in Syria

== Bibliography ==
- Robinson, E.; Smith, E. (1841). Biblical Researches in Palestine, Mount Sinai and Arabia Petraea: A Journal of Travels in the year 1838. Vol. 3. Boston: Crocker & Brewster.
