= Khirbet Awad =

Khirbet Awad خربة عواد Khirbet Awwad
- Village
- Location in Syria
- Coordinates: 32°19′24″N 36°42′40″E
- Country: Syria
- Governorate: Suwayda
- District: Salkhad
- Subdistrict: Ghariyah

Population (2004)
  - Total: 398

Khirbet Awad (Arabic: خربة عواد; also spelled Khirbet Awwad) is a village in southern Syria, administratively part of the Salkhad District of the Suwayda Governorate. It straddles Syria's border with Jordan. The closest localities are al-Mughayyir to the northwest and Al-Aanat to the northeast. In the 2004 census it had a population of 398. Its inhabitants are predominantly Druze.

== History ==
During late Ottoman rule, Khirbet Awad was settled by Druze. In the mid-19th century, the village was controlled by the Druze Sharaf ad-Din clan. It remained under Sharaf ad-Din control, but became part of the Bani al-Atrash clan's zone of influence by 1867. When the Ottoman Empire was driven from the region of Syria during World War I, its Arab territories were divided between France and Great Britain. The former were accorded control of modern-day Syria, while the latter controlled modern-day Jordan. In the division of the area, the straight border between the two countries was interrupted by Khirbet Awad, which was made part of Syria. The border formed a 90-degree angle around the village, which was situated 60 meters north of the border with Jordan.

== See also ==
- Druze in Syria
