= Men of Dignity =

Syrian Druze militia

Men of Dignity Sheikhs of Dignity
- Rijal al-Karama
- Founder: Wahid al-Balous
- Leaders: Wahid al-Balous (2013/2014–2015) †; Ra'fat al-Balous (approx. November 2015–February 2017); Yahya al-Hajjar (February 2017–August 2025); Mazid Khaddaj (Abu Diab) (24 August 2025–present)
- Spokesperson: Bassem Abu Fakhr
- Dates active: 2013 or 2014 – present
- Country: Syria
- Headquarters: Suwayda
- Active regions: Suwayda Governorate; Quneitra Governorate
- Part of: Southern Operations Room (2024–2025); Decisive Battle Operations Room (2024)
- Wars: Syrian civil war; Battle of Dama; Quneitra offensive (September 2016); 2018 Southern Syria offensive; 2018 Suwayda attacks; 2024 Syrian opposition offensives; 2024 Southern Syria offensive; Syrian conflict (2024–present); Druze insurgency in Southern Syria (2025–present); 2025 Jaramana clashes; Southern Syria clashes (April–May 2025); Southern Syria clashes (July 2025–present)

The Men of Dignity (Arabic: رجال الكرامة, romanized: Rijāl al-Karāma) is a Druze militia operating primarily in the Suwayda Governorate of southern Syria, which was described in 2020 as a third way faction, neither opposed nor aligned with the Assad regime. Nonetheless, it previously allied with the Assad regime in fighting against the Al-Nusra Front. Though the group initially cooperated with the Syrian caretaker government and the Syrian transitional government after the fall of the Assad regime in December 2024, the militia took up arms against it following the July 2025 Southern Syria clashes.

In August 2025, amid a change of leadership, the group announced it was joining the Druze-led National Guard despite having previously opposed such a merger. Though it followed through with joining the National Guard in the subsequent months, tensions would soon resurface between it and the Guard's leadership, and by August 2026 sources would differ on whether the Men of Dignity were still considered part of the National Guard or not.

== Organization ==
The group has multiple subdivisions, including Bayraq al-Maqdad, Bayraq al-Sindyan and Bayraq al-Haq.

Other groups involved include: "Bayraq al-Izz, Bayraq al-Fahad, ... Bayraq al-Sheikh, Bayraq al-Nidal, Bayraq al-Basha [Pasha], Bayraq al-Fakhr, Bayraq Sayf Al-Jabal, ... Bayraq al-Nabi Dawoud, Bayraq al-Khidr" and "Bayraq al-Harm."

== History ==
The Men of Dignity armed movement was founded in 2013 by Wahid al-Balous. Its primary focus during the early years of the Syrian civil war was to avoid the conscription of Druze men into the Syrian Arab Army. The group continued to assist draft evaders, as of 2020. The militia has been described as a "third-way" faction, with researcher Thomas Pierret emphasizing that the group was "really about defending the province."

=== Leadership ===
Group founder Wahid al-Balous was assassinated by a car bomb in Suwayda in September 2015. Two months after his assassination, his brother Ra'fat assumed leadership, though he would cede the position to Yahya al-Hajjar as a result of injuries which he sustained in the assassination.

Mazid Khaddaj, a.k.a. Abu Diab, became the leader of the group in August 2025. According to an activist interviewed by Syria Direct, Khaddaj was appointed by Druze religious leader Hikmat al-Hijri after al-Hijri ousted al-Hajjar in a "military coup". Al-Hajjar had reportedly opposed the integration of the Men of Dignity into the al-Hijri-loyal National Guard paramilitary group.

==== Splinter group ====
One of Wahid's sons, Laith al-Balous, was expelled from the Men of Dignity in 2015 after his father's death. Laith's brother, Fahd al-Balous, and Laith were in control of the Guest House of Dignity, which served as the "operations and administrative center" for the Men of Dignity and was formed in 2013, with Laith serving as the leader. Laith's group would remain allied to the Syrian government of Ahmed al-Sharaa even after the main wing of the Men of Dignity aligned itself with the anti-Sharaa National Guard in August 2025. As of early 2026, Laith's Guest House of Dignity group would reportedly be based in the Al-Mazraa area of Suwayda governorate, on the Syrian government side of the ceasefire lines with anti-Damascus Druze forces, and the Syrian government would refer to Laith as the leader of the Men of Dignity.

=== Activities ===
==== Assad-era ====
The Battle of Dama in August 2014, which was fought in the village of Dama against the Al-Nusra Front, became known as the "al-Karama battle", meaning the "battle of Dignity", and those who fought in it were nicknamed the "Men of Dignity." The faction battled alongside the Assad regime.

Residents and members of the group protested in June 2015 against the removal of "tanks and artillery" that were being moved outside of the governorate, allowing three tanks to leave for repairs, while others vehicles were returned.

The Men of Dignity allied with Al-Jabal Brigade and the armed wing of the Syrian Socialist National Party, Eagles of the Whirlwind, in July 2018 while fighting against the Islamic State.

A member of the group died following September 2020 clashes between the Eighth Brigade and Druze groups, including the Sheikh al-Karama Forces, Al-Fahd Forces, Kata'ib Humat al-Diyar, Ma'an Zahreddin group, Karem Ubaid group, and Usoud al-Jabal group, in addition to the National Defence Forces.

Following multiple kidnappings by the Military Intelligence Directorate-affiliated Raji Falhout group, led by Raji Falhout, the Men of Dignity and several other Druze militias clashed with the Raji Falhout group in July 2022 and took over their headquarters. The following month, the Men of Dignity continued their campaign against armed groups and confronted the Al-Fahd Forces in Qanawat.

The Men of Dignity engaged in combat with the Assad-aligned military in the city of Suwayda during the 2024 Southern Syria offensive, resulting in at least two deaths and four wounded.

==== Post-Assad era ====
The group issued a joint statement with the Al-Jabal Brigade in January 2025 emphasizing that it was prepared to integrate into a new "military body", following the December 2024 fall of the Assad regime.

At least one member of the organization, Wajdi al-Hajj Ali, died in the April 2025 Rif Dimashq clashes.

The office of Suwayda governor Mustafa al-Bakour was stormed on 21 May 2025 by armed criminals who successfully released Raghib Qarqout, a convicted car thief. The Men of Dignity provided cover for al-Bakour's exit, while the Al-Jabal Brigade engaged with the criminals.

The group fought against the Syrian state in the July 2025 Southern Syria clashes and suffered at least 50 fatalities. A week later, the militia announced that it had sustained 46 additional deaths.

In late August, the Men of Dignity announced that it planned to join the National Guard, a new umbrella armed group formed under anti-Damascus Druze religious leader Hikmat al-Hijri, after what one activist called a "military coup" against the group's commander. The Men of Dignity had been opposed to al-Hijri before the outbreak of violence in July, and leader Yahya al-Hajjar had reportedly continued afterwards to oppose integration into the National Guard. Just prior to the group's announcement that it would join the National Guard after all, al-Hajjar had been sidelined and replaced by al-Hijri ally Mazid Khaddaj (Abu Diab).

The Men of Dignity's integration into the National Guard took place on 2 October 2025. According to Men of Dignity spokesman Bassem Abu Fakhr, many of the groups' fighters were expected to form a new brigade under the National Guard.

Tensions arose between Men of Dignity forces and core factions of the National Guard in February 2026, after alleged members of the latter briefly kidnapped former Men of Dignity leader Yahya al-Hajjar from his farm. According to Al Modon, most Men of Dignity fighters remained loyal to al-Hajjar, and would likely have entered combat with against the National Guard if he hadn't been released. The Men of Dignity organization subsequently played down the incident, saying the National Guard leadership had cooperated in getting al-Hajjar released, and denying reports of National Guard involvement in the kidnapping or a major mobilization of the Men of Dignity to rescue him.

In late July 2026, Men of Dignity head Mazid Khaddaj sided with Suwayda public figure Sheikh Fadi Badriya against factions close to the National Guard leadership in a dispute over the seizure of a local family's property by the latter. This reportedly sparked a deployment of the Men of Dignity and subsequent tensions between the group and the National Guard over the following days. According to Lebanese news outlet Al-Modon, relations between the Men of Dignity and the National Guard would continue to deteriorate in August amid a broader breakdown in the security order in Suwayda, leading to limited clashes between the two sides midway through the month.

In early August, an Etana Syria report described the Men of Dignity as outside of and opposed to the National Guard's command structure, while later in the month Kataeb said it was still "nominally" part of the National Guard, though its members were largely opposed to the actions of factions close to the Guard's leadership.
