= Sheikh al-Karama Forces =

Syrian armed group

- قوات شيخ الكرامة
- Flag used by the group
- Leaders: Fahd al-Balous (formerly); Laith al-Balous (formerly); Wissam Eid †
- Dates active: March 2016–August 2025
- Split from: Men of Dignity
- Merged into: National Guard
- Ideology: Regionalism
- Part of: Southern Operations Room
- Wars: Syrian Civil War; Syrian conflict (2024–present); Southern Syria clashes (July 2025–present)

The Sheikh al-Karama Forces was a Druze militia group based in the As-Suwayda Governorate in southern Syria, that emerged during the Syrian civil war. Despite the group clashing with Syrian government forces and Hezbollah on numerous occasions, it was not part of the nationwide Free Syrian Army or general Syrian opposition. In August 2025, the group merged into the Druze-led National Guard.

== History ==
=== Men of Dignity ===
The Men of Dignity emerged in 2014 with supporters of Wahid al-Balous who was a dissident of the government in the Druze community and initially called for the removal of the Syrian government. However, he and his movement were noted as neither being supportive of the Syrian government nor necessarily opposed to it, but rather wanted reform and steps to be taken to reduce corruption within the Syrian government. There was also speculation as to whether he wanted to establish his own separatist Druze state or make a deal with the FSA for autonomy. Despite this, however, his supporters were known to use the flag of Syria and refer to the Syrian army respectably as the Syrian Arab Army. The group also stressed strict self-defense, and claimed to have support from the Druze community in Israel which it called Palestine instead, and does reject Druze cooperation with the Israeli government. The Men of Dignity also did not oppose the Syrian military. However, they did oppose the government's conscription program and instead wanted to focus on local defense.

Wahid al-Balous was killed by a car bomb in 2015. After his death, many false reports emerged that Druze militants were joining the Free Syrian Army, and that a new Druze FSA group had been established in Suwayda, as part of the greater Syrian Civil War that has left Suwayda largely unaffected. After the assassination, the group released a statement blaming the government. However, they expressed they would continue to work within a framework supported by the government. A new leader also took over the group named Yahya al-Hajjar.

=== Sheikh al-Karama Forces ===
The group was established in March 2016, after splitting from the Men of Dignity. One of the catalysts of the split was the unwillingness of al-Balous to attack the Syrian state. However, they do not hold tensions with the Men of Dignity.

The al-Karama Forces were formerly led by brothers Laith al-Balous and Fahd al-Balous, who are the sons of Wahid al-Balous. The two brothers are affiliated with the Guest House of Dignity, which Laith leads.

The group kidnapped and killed a Syrian drug trafficker named Ahmed Jaafar in March 2018.

Members of the Druze community and the group were targeted by the Syrian Ba'athist government; the group claims that several members of the Druze community in the Suwayda governorate were arrested and tortured under terrorism charges.

On 21 February 2019, the Sheikh al-Karama Forces attacked the Syrian government's military intelligence forces in Suwayda, after the family of a Syrian opposition member asked the group to help them retake the person's house, which the government had seized years before.

On 3 May 2019, one of the group's commanders, named Wissam Eid, was shot by unidentified gunmen south of Suwayda. He later died at a hospital due to injuries from the attack. Later on the same day, a Syrian government military intelligence position was attacked by gunmen. However, the Sheikh al-Karama Forces denied it was behind the attack on the military intelligence outpost. Wissam reportedly led his own faction in the group that held tensions with the main leadership and was previously the target of an assassination attempt in April 2019, and both Wissam's faction and the main leadership have accused each other of committing crimes including kidnappings and murder.

On 4 December 2019, the group released a statement that called on natives of the Suwayda governorate abroad to send financial aid due to a reported increase in poverty in the area; the group also denounced aid programs from the Syrian government and Russia. The group also claims that the government intentionally neglects the governorate, and called Russian forces in Syria occupation forces, and also claimed that they were stealing from Syria.

On 26 March 2020, the group clashed with the Syrian military in the southern part of the Suwayda governorate. During the clashes, four fighters belonging to the Sheikh al-Karama Forces were killed and one pro-government fighter was killed. After the clashes, the al-Karama Forces announced they were increasing their level of preparedness for future confrontations with the government, and days prior to the clashes the group swapped prisoners with the government.

The Sheikh al-Karama Forces aligned with Druze groups, including Al-Fahd Forces, Kata'ib Humat al-Diyar, Ma’an Zahreddin group, Karem Ubaid group, and Usoud al-Jabal group, in addition to the National Defence Forces (NDF), in September 2020 and fought against the Eighth Brigade.

The faction aligned itself with Druze spiritual leader Hikmat al-Hijri following the July 2025 clashes in Southern Syria and fought against Public Security, sustaining deaths in Al-Mujaymer and Al-Thaalah, as well as injuries.

Suwayda militant groups (including Sheikh al-Karama Forces) announced the formation of an army called the National Guard, comprising thousands of fighters.

== See also ==
- Jaysh al-Muwahhideen
- Sultan Pasha al-Atrash Battalion
- Golan Regiment
- Al-Sanadid Forces
- Syrian National Resistance
