= List of populated places in Suwayda Governorate =

Suwayda Governorate is one of Syria's 14 governorates (provinces). It has an area of 5,550 km^{2}. Its capital and major town is Suwayda.

The governorate has a population of about 346,000 inhabitants (est. 2007). The inhabitants are predominantly Druze with Greek Orthodox minority, there is also a small Muslim community.

Most of the inhabitants live in the western parts of the governorate, in Jabal al-Druze and Leja regions. Only nomadic Bedouin tribes live in the eastern parts, which constitute a barren rocky desert.

The governorate is divided into 3 districts (manatiq): Suwayda District, Salkhad District and Shahba District. These are further divided into 9 sub-districts (nawahi).

There are 3 cities, 124 villages and 36 hamlets in the governorate.

English name	Arabic name	District	Population	Elevation	Location
Al-Ajailat	العجيلات	Suwayda District	1,500		32°45′48″N 36°46′50″E
Al-Kafr	الكفر	Suwayda District		1360 m	32°38′0″N 36°38′30″E
Al-Ariqah	عريقة	Shahba District	3,000	800 m	32°53′10″N 36°28′50″E
Suwayda	السويداء	Suwayda District	73,641	1095 m	32°42′0″N 36°34′0″E
Dama	داما	Shahba District		725 m	32°57′10″N 36°25′50″E
Imtan	امتان	Salkhad District	2,600	1189 m	32°25′0″N 36°49′0″E
Qanawat	قنوات	Suwayda District		1200 m	32°45′20″N 36°37′0″E
Salkhad	صلخد	Salkhad District	15,000	1350 m	32°29′30″N 36°42′40″E
Shahba	شهبا	Shahba District			32°51′15″N 36°37′45″E
Shaqqa	شقا	Shahba District	8,000	1070 m	32°53′50″N 36°41′50″E
