= Sumayd =

Sumayd صميد Smeid
- Village
- Location within Syria
- Coordinates: 32°56′46″N 36°30′54″E
- PAL: 292/261
- Country: Syria
- Governorate: Suwayda
- District: Shahba
- Subdistrict: Ariqah

Population (2004 census)
  - Total: 853
- Time zone: UTC+2 (EET)
  - Summer (DST): UTC+3 (EEST)

Sumayd (Arabic: صميد) is a village situated in the Shahba District of Suwayda Governorate, in southern Syria. According to the Syria Central Bureau of Statistics (CBS), Sumayd had a population of 853 in the 2004 census. Its inhabitants are predominantly Druze.

== History ==
In 1596, it appeared in Ottoman tax registers under the name of Samad al-Harir, located in the nahiya of Bani Miglad in the Qada Hawran. It was noted as Hali (empty), but taxes were paid for use of the land, a lump sum of 3,350 akçe.

In 1838, it was noted as Sumeid, situated "in the Lejah, east of Dama". Its inhabitants were noted as Druze.

== Religious buildings ==
- Maqam al-Khidr (Druze Shrine)

== See also ==
- Druze in Syria

== Bibliography ==
- Hütteroth, W.-D.; Abdulfattah, K. (1977). Historical Geography of Palestine, Transjordan and Southern Syria in the Late 16th Century. Erlanger Geographische Arbeiten, Sonderband 5. Erlangen, Germany: Vorstand der Fränkischen Geographischen Gesellschaft. ISBN 3-920405-41-2.
- Robinson, E.; Smith, E. (1841). Biblical Researches in Palestine, Mount Sinai and Arabia Petraea: A Journal of Travels in the year 1838. Vol. 3. Boston: Crocker & Brewster.
