= Raji Falhout =

- Born: 3 October 1985 (age 40); Attil, Suwayda, Syria

Raji Falhout (Arabic: راجي فلحوط, born 3 October 1985, in Attil, Suwayda), is a Syrian paramilitary leader who had close ties to the Bashar al-Assad regime.

== Personal life ==
Falhout lived in Qatar before the Syrian civil war began in 2011.

== Activities ==
He led the Raji Falhout group, which was closely tied with Syrian military intelligence.

He was arrested in September 2021 by the local state security branch, though he was released the same day.

The groups headquarters in the city of Attil, in addition to their base in Slaim, was raided in July 2022 by the Men of Dignity and other groups, after the kidnapping of several university students from Shahba. An extensive amount of captagon was located after Falhout fled, in addition to evidence of drug trafficking and his relations with military intelligence in the area. An investigation by BBC Arabic and the Organized Crime and Corruption Reporting Project unveiled ties between Falhout and a Hezbollah member named Hussein Riad al-Faytrouni, based on access to an unlocked mobile phone. The Syrian information ministry revoked the BBC's accreditation after the report was released.

== Sanctions ==
Falhout was sanctioned by the United Kingdom's Foreign, Commonwealth and Development Office in March 2023 in addition to being sanctioned by the US Department of the Treasury's Office of Foreign Assets Control in October 2024.
