= Jidiya =

Jidiya جديا
- Village
- Location within Syria
- Coordinates: 32°51′52″N 36°32′00″E
- Grid position: 293/252
- Country: Syria
- Governorate: Suwayda
- District: Suwayda
- Subdistrict: Mazraa

Population (2004 census)
  - Total: 150
- Time zone: UTC+2 (EET)
  - Summer (DST): UTC+3 (EEST)

Jidiya (Arabic: جديا), is a village in southern Syria, administratively part of the Suwayda Governorate. According to the Syria Central Bureau of Statistics (CBS), Jidiya had a population of 150 in the 2004 census. Its inhabitants are predominantly Druze.

== History ==
In 1838, it was noted as a ruin, Jedeiya, situated "in the Lejah, south of Dama".

== See also ==
- Druze in Syria

== Bibliography ==
- Robinson, E.; Smith, E. (1841). Biblical Researches in Palestine, Mount Sinai and Arabia Petraea: A Journal of Travels in the year 1838. Vol. 3. Boston: Crocker & Brewster.
