= Taala =

Taala تعلا
- Village
- Location within Syria
- Coordinates: 32°57′49″N 36°40′45″E
- Country: Syria
- Governorate: Suwayda
- District: Shahba
- Subdistrict: Shaqqa

Population (2004 census)
  - Total: 183
- Time zone: UTC+2 (EET)
  - Summer (DST): UTC+3 (EEST)

Taala (Arabic: تعلا) is a village situated in the Shahba District of Suwayda Governorate, in southern Syria. According to the Syria Central Bureau of Statistics (CBS), Taala had a population of 183 in the 2004 census. Its inhabitants are predominantly Druze.

== Religious buildings ==
- Maqam Mawlay al-Nafas (Druze Shrine)

== See also ==
- Druze in Syria
