= Deir Dama =

Deir Dama دير داما، دير المياس Deir al-Mayyas
- Village
- Location within Syria
- Coordinates: 32°58′14″N 36°27′14″E
- PAL: 286/265
- Country: Syria
- Governorate: Suwayda
- District: Shahba
- Subdistrict: Ariqah

Population (2004 census)
  - Total: 537
- Time zone: UTC+2 (EET)
  - Summer (DST): UTC+3 (EEST)

Deir Dama (Arabic: دير داما, also known as Deir al-Mayyas) is a village situated in the Shahba District of Suwayda Governorate, in southern Syria. According to the Syria Central Bureau of Statistics (CBS), Deir Dama had a population of 537 in the 2004 census. Its inhabitants are predominantly Druze.

== History ==
In 1838, Eli Smith noted it as 'Deir Dama the outer', a ruin located in the Lejah, south of Dama'.

In 2014, local Bedouin aligned with the al-Nusra front took over the settlement, killing six residents and kidnapping seven others, while the rest were displaced. After the end of the Syrian Civil War, about 25 people returned to the village but they were likely displaced again during the Southern Syria clashes since the village was again deserted in August 2025. The village is currently under control of the Syrian government.

== See also ==
- Druze in Syria

== Bibliography ==
- Robinson, E.; Smith, E. (1841). Biblical Researches in Palestine, Mount Sinai and Arabia Petraea: A Journal of Travels in the year 1838. Vol. 3. Boston: Crocker & Brewster.
