= As-Salmiyah =

As-Salmiyah السالمية
- Village
- Location within Syria
- Coordinates: 33°00′45″N 36°40′50″E
- Country: Syria
- Governorate: Suwayda
- District: Shahba
- Subdistrict: Sawra as-Saghira

Population (2004 census)
  - Total: 219
- Time zone: UTC+2 (EET)
  - Summer (DST): UTC+3 (EEST)

As-Salmiyah (Arabic: السالمية) is a village situated in the Shahba District of Suwayda Governorate, in southern Syria. According to the Syria Central Bureau of Statistics (CBS), As-Salmiyah had a population of 219 in the 2004 census. Its inhabitants are predominantly Druze.

== See also ==
- Druze in Syria
