= Sour, Daraa =

Sour صور
- Village
- Location in Syria
- Coordinates: 32°57′30″N 36°18′06″E
- PAL: 272/263
- Country: Syria
- Governorate: Daraa
- District: Izraa
- Subdistrict: Izraa

Population (2004 census)
  - Total: 924

Sour (Arabic: صور) is a village in southern Syria, administratively part of the Izraa District in the Daraa Governorate. According to the Syria Central Bureau of Statistics (CBS), Sour had a population of 924 in the 2004 census. Its inhabitants are predominantly Sunni Muslims.

== History ==
In 1596, it appeared in the Ottoman tax registers named Sur; part of the nahiya of Bani Kilab in the Hauran Sanjak. It had an entirely Muslim population consisting of 14 households and 7 bachelors. The villagers paid a fixed tax rate of 40% on various agricultural products, including wheat (3600 akçe), barley (900 a.), summer crops (540 a.), goats and beehives (100 a.). in addition to "occasional revenues" (190 a.); a total of 5,330 akçe. 15/24 of the revenue went to a waqf.

In 1838, Sur was noted as a ruin, located "in the Lejah", west of Dama.

== Bibliography ==
- Hütteroth, W.-D.; Abdulfattah, K. (1977). Historical Geography of Palestine, Transjordan and Southern Syria in the Late 16th Century. Erlanger Geographische Arbeiten, Sonderband 5. Erlangen, Germany: Vorstand der Fränkischen Geographischen Gesellschaft. ISBN 3-920405-41-2.
- Robinson, E.; Smith, E. (1841). Biblical Researches in Palestine, Mount Sinai and Arabia Petraea: A Journal of Travels in the year 1838. Vol. 3. Boston: Crocker & Brewster.
