= Az-Zabayer =

Az-Zabayer الزباير
- Village
- Location in Syria
- Coordinates: 32°58′56″N 36°17′56″E
- PAL: 272/266
- Country: Syria
- Governorate: Daraa
- District: Izraa
- Subdistrict: Izraa

Population (2004 census)
  - Total: 471

Az-Zabayer (Arabic: الزباير) is a village in southern Syria, administratively part of the Izraa District in the Daraa Governorate. According to the Syria Central Bureau of Statistics (CBS), az-Zabayer had a population of 471 in the 2004 census. Its inhabitants are predominantly Sunni Muslims.

== History ==
=== Antiquity ===
An inscription dated to 213–214 AD records a dedication by the Arisenoi and Iachphirenoi, two local groups, together with a certain Bassos. It was first interpreted as referring to the construction of one or more Tychaia (shrines dedicated to Tyche, the Greek goddess of fortune), but later scholarship has suggested that it more likely commemorates the dedication of smaller cult monuments, such as altars or aediculae.

=== Ottoman period ===
In 1596, the village appeared in the Ottoman tax registers as Zabira as-Sarqiyya and was part of the nahiya of Bani Kilab in the Hauran Sanjak. It had a Muslim population consisting of 22 households and 8 bachelors, in addition to 2 Christian households; a total of 32 "taxable units". The villagers paid a fixed tax-rate of 40% on wheat (4800 a.), barley (1080 a.), summer crops (1120 a.), goats and beehives (200 a.), in addition to "occasional revenues" (100 a.); a total of 7,300 akçe. All of the revenue went to a Waqf.

In 1838, ez-Zebireh was noted as a ruin, located "in the Lejah", west of Dama.

== Religious buildings ==
- Mosque

== Bibliography ==
- Hütteroth, W.-D.; Abdulfattah, K. (1977). Historical Geography of Palestine, Transjordan and Southern Syria in the Late 16th Century. Erlanger Geographische Arbeiten, Sonderband 5. Erlangen, Germany: Vorstand der Fränkischen Geographischen Gesellschaft. ISBN 3-920405-41-2.
- Mazzilli, Francesca (2018). Rural Cult Centres in the Hauran: Part of the broader network of the Near East (100 BC–AD 300). Archaeopress. pp. 164–165. doi:10.2307/j.ctvndv916. ISBN 978-1-78491-954-2.
- Robinson, E.; Smith, E. (1841). Biblical Researches in Palestine, Mount Sinai and Arabia Petraea: A Journal of Travels in the year 1838. Vol. 3. Boston: Crocker & Brewster.
