= Al-Fahd Forces =

Pro-Assad group

- Leader: Salim Humeid
- Dates active: 2020–2025
- Merged into: National Guard
- Headquarters: Qanawat, Suwayda, Syria
- Size: 50
- Wars: Syrian civil war; Syrian conflict (2024–present); Druze insurgency in Southern Syria (2025–present)

The Al-Fahd Forces, also translated as the Panther Forces, were a government-aligned faction in Syria during the Syrian civil war which was led by Salim Humeid.

== History ==
The Al-Fahd Forces aligned with various Druze groups, including Sheikh al-Karama Forces, Kata'ib Humat al-Diyar, Ma’an Zahreddin group, Karem Ubaid group, and Usoud al-Jabal group, in addition to the National Defence Forces (NDF), in September 2020 while fighting against the Eighth Brigade.

The group cooperated with protestors in blocking the Damascus-Suwayda Highway following the outbreak of protests in February 2022 in Suwayda Governorate, primarily over the increase in costs after the removal of subsidies by the state.

Salim Humeid announced in late July 2022 that his group would withdraw its weapons, in response to the Al-Jabal Brigade giving the group 24 hours to give up its weapons.

Laith al-Balous, the Al-Jabal Brigade and the Anti-Terrorism Force launched a "security campaign" against the Al-Fahd Forces and the Raji Falhout group in Qanawat on 11 August 2022.

Humeid's brother, as well as Salim al-Qan’abani, were arrested on 11 August 2022. Humeid turned himself in to the leader of the Al-Jabal Brigade, Murhij al-Jarmani, who released him. This took place at the request of a Druze spiritual authority, which inflamed tensions.

Humeid initially agreed to abide by a proposed reconciliation agreement, but he opened fire after his release.

The faction joined the National Guard in August 2025.
