= Al-Khalidiyah, Suwayda =

Al-Khalidiyah الخالدية Al-Khalidiyeh
- Village
- Location within Syria
- Coordinates: 32°59′11″N 36°38′42″E
- Country: Syria
- Governorate: Suwayda
- District: Shahba
- Subdistrict: Sawra as-Saghira

Population (2004 census)
  - Total: 937
- Time zone: UTC+2 (EET)
  - Summer (DST): UTC+3 (EEST)

Al-Khalidiyah (Arabic: الخالدية) is a village situated in the Shahba District of Suwayda Governorate, in southern Syria. According to the Syria Central Bureau of Statistics (CBS), Al-Khalidiyah had a population of 937 in the 2004 census. Its inhabitants are predominantly Druze.

== Religious buildings ==
- Maqam Mawlay al-Nafas (Druze Shrine)

== See also ==
- Druze in Syria
