= Arajah =

Arajah عراجة
- Village
- Location within Syria
- Coordinates: 32°52′03″N 36°46′13″E
- PAL: 316/253
- Country: Syria
- Governorate: Suwayda
- District: Shahba
- Subdistrict: Shaqqa

Population (2004 census)
  - Total: 738
- Time zone: UTC+2 (EET)
  - Summer (DST): UTC+3 (EEST)

Arajah (Arabic: عراجة) is a village situated in the Shahba District of Suwayda Governorate, in southern Syria. According to the Syria Central Bureau of Statistics (CBS), Arajah had a population of 738 in the 2004 census. Its inhabitants are predominantly Druze.

== See also ==
- Druze in Syria
