= Tulaylin =

Tulaylin طليلين
- Village
- Location within Syria
- Coordinates: 32°36′16″N 36°46′18″E
- Country: Syria
- Governorate: Suwayda
- District: Salkhad
- Subdistrict: Malah

Population (2004 census)
  - Total: 451
- Time zone: UTC+2 (EET)
  - Summer (DST): UTC+3 (EEST)

Tulaylin (Arabic: طليلين) is a village situated in the Salkhad District of Suwayda Governorate, in southern Syria. According to the Syria Central Bureau of Statistics (CBS), Tulaylin had a population of 451 in the 2004 census. Its inhabitants are predominantly Druze.

== Religious buildings ==
- Maqam Al-Miqdad (Druze Shrine)

== See also ==
- Druze in Syria
