= Al-Qasr, Suwayda =

Al-Qasr القصر
- Village
- Location within Syria
- Coordinates: 33°00′30″N 36°44′20″E
- Country: Syria
- Governorate: Suwayda
- District: Shahba
- Subdistrict: Shaqqa

Population (2004 census)
  - Total: 532
- Time zone: UTC+2 (EET)
  - Summer (DST): UTC+3 (EEST)

Al-Qasr (Arabic: القصر) is a village situated in the Shahba District of Suwayda Governorate, in southern Syria. According to the Syria Central Bureau of Statistics (CBS), Al-Qasr had a population of 532 in the 2004 census. Its inhabitants are predominantly Sunni Muslim Bedouins.

Bedouin villages near al-Qasr: Shinwan, al-Asfar, al-Muftara, as-Saqiyah, Banat Baeir, Siret Alya, Tall Ushayib, Rajm Dawlah, al-Ushayib, Haytalah, Abu Harat and Khirbet Umm Atayiq.

The Bedouin villages were formerly strongholds of the Islamic State in the Suwayda Governorate.

== Religious buildings ==
- Mosque
