= Shaaf =

Shaaf شعف
- Village
- Location within Syria
- Coordinates: 32°37′06″N 36°50′56″E
- Country: Syria
- Governorate: Suwayda
- District: Salkhad
- Subdistrict: Malah

Population (2004 census)
  - Total: 886
- Time zone: UTC+2 (EET)
  - Summer (DST): UTC+3 (EEST)

Shaaf (Arabic: شعف) is a village situated in the Salkhad District of Suwayda Governorate, in southern Syria. According to the Syria Central Bureau of Statistics (CBS), Shaaf had a population of 886 in the 2004 census. Its inhabitants are predominantly Druze.

== Religious buildings ==
- Maqam al-Khidr (Druze Shrine)

== See also ==
- Druze in Syria
