= Baham, Suwayda =

Baham بهم
- Village
- Location within Syria
- Coordinates: 32°33′40″N 36°48′58″E
- Country: Syria
- Governorate: Suwayda
- District: Salkhad
- Subdistrict: Malah

Population (2004 census)
  - Total: 508
- Time zone: UTC+2 (EET)
  - Summer (DST): UTC+3 (EEST)

Baham (Arabic: بهم) is a village situated in the Salkhad District of Suwayda Governorate, in southern Syria. According to the Syria Central Bureau of Statistics (CBS), Baham had a population of 508 in the 2004 census. Its inhabitants are predominantly Druze.

== See also ==
- Druze in Syria
