= Ash-Sha'ab =

Ash-Sha'ab الشعاب
- Village
- Location within Syria
- Coordinates: 32°31′37″N 36°58′25″E
- Country: Syria
- Governorate: Suwayda
- District: Salkhad
- Subdistrict: Malah

Population (2004 census)
  - Total: 403
- Time zone: UTC+2 (EET)
  - Summer (DST): UTC+3 (EEST)

Ash-Sha'ab (Arabic: الشعاب) is a village situated in the Salkhad District of Suwayda Governorate, in southern Syria. According to the Syria Central Bureau of Statistics (CBS), Ash-Sha'ab had a population of 403 in the 2004 census. Its inhabitants are predominantly Sunni Muslim Bedouins.
