= Al-Buwair =

Al-Buwair البوير Al-Buwayr
- Village
- Location in Syria
- Coordinates: 32°55′50″N 36°17′02″E
- PAL: 272/260
- Country: Syria
- Governorate: Daraa
- District: Izraa
- Subdistrict: Izraa

Population (2004 census)
  - Total: 713

Al-Buwair (Arabic: البوير) is a village in southern Syria, administratively part of the Izraa District in the Daraa Governorate. According to the Syria Central Bureau of Statistics (CBS), Al-Buwair had a population of 713 in the 2004 census. Its inhabitants are predominantly Sunni Muslims.

== History ==
In 1838, it was noted as a ruin, el-Buweir, situated "in the Lejah, west of Dama".

== Religious buildings ==
- Mosque

== Bibliography ==
- Robinson, E.; Smith, E. (1841). Biblical Researches in Palestine, Mount Sinai and Arabia Petraea: A Journal of Travels in the year 1838. Vol. 3. Boston: Crocker & Brewster.
