= As-Suwaymrah =

As-Suwaymrah السويمرة
- Village
- Location within Syria
- Coordinates: 32°55′48″N 36°35′58″E
- Country: Syria
- Governorate: Suwayda
- District: Shahba
- Subdistrict: Shahba

Population (2004 census)
  - Total: 352
- Time zone: UTC+2 (EET)
  - Summer (DST): UTC+3 (EEST)

As-Suwaymrah (Arabic: السويمرة) is a village situated in the Shahba District of Suwayda Governorate, in southern Syria. According to the Syria Central Bureau of Statistics (CBS), As-Suwaymrah had a population of 352 in the 2004 census. Its inhabitants are predominantly Druze.

== History ==
In 1838, es-Suweimirah was noted as a ruin, situated "in the Luhf, east of the Lejah, i.e. in Wady el-Liwa".

== Religious buildings ==
- Maqam Abu Abdullah Muhammad bin Wahb Al-Qurashi (Druze Shrine)

== See also ==
- Druze in Syria

== Bibliography ==
- Robinson, E.; Smith, E. (1841). Biblical Researches in Palestine, Mount Sinai and Arabia Petraea: A Journal of Travels in the year 1838. Vol. 3. Boston: Crocker & Brewster.
