= Al-Afinah =

Al-Afinah العفينة
- Village
- Location within Syria
- Coordinates: 32°36′00″N 36°35′14″E
- Country: Syria
- Governorate: Suwayda
- District: Salkhad
- Subdistrict: Qurayyah

Population (2004 census)
  - Total: 2,023
- Time zone: UTC+2 (EET)
  - Summer (DST): UTC+3 (EEST)

Al-Afinah (Arabic: العفينة) is a village situated in the Salkhad District of Suwayda Governorate, in southern Syria. According to the Syria Central Bureau of Statistics (CBS), Al-Afinah had a population of 2,023 in the 2004 census. Its inhabitants are predominantly Druze.

== Religious buildings ==
- Maqam Sheikh Saleh (Druze Shrine)

== See also ==
- Druze in Syria
