= Jirrin =

Jirrin جرين Jerein
- Village
- Location within Syria
- Coordinates: 32°55′50″N 36°24′14″E
- PAL: 281/260
- Country: Syria
- Governorate: Suwayda
- District: Shahba
- Subdistrict: Ariqah

Population (2004 census)
  - Total: 507
- Time zone: UTC+2 (EET)
  - Summer (DST): UTC+3 (EEST)

Jirrin (Arabic: جرين) is a village situated in the Shahba District of Suwayda Governorate, in southern Syria. According to the Syria Central Bureau of Statistics (CBS), Jirrin had a population of 507 in the 2004 census. Its inhabitants are predominantly Druze.

== History ==
In 1596 Jirrin appeared in the Ottoman tax registers as part of the nahiya of Bani Abdullah, in the Hauran Sanjak. It had an entirely Muslim population consisting of 6 households and 3 bachelors. The villagers paid a fixed tax rate of 40% on various agricultural products, including wheat (1500 a.), barley (900 a.), summer crops (800 a.), goats and/or beehives (100 a.); a total of 3,300 akçe.

== See also ==
- Druze in Syria

== Bibliography ==
- Hütteroth, W.-D.; Abdulfattah, K. (1977). Historical Geography of Palestine, Transjordan and Southern Syria in the Late 16th Century. Erlanger Geographische Arbeiten, Sonderband 5. Erlangen, Germany: Vorstand der Fränkischen Geographischen Gesellschaft. ISBN 3-920405-41-2.
