= Burd, Suwayda =

Burd برد
- Village
- Location within Syria
- Coordinates: 32°30′31″N 36°32′33″E
- PAL: 295/213
- Country: Syria
- Governorate: Suwayda
- District: Salkhad
- Subdistrict: Qurayyah

Population (2004 census)
  - Total: 207
- Time zone: UTC+2 (EET)
  - Summer (DST): UTC+3 (EEST)

Burd (Arabic: برد) is a village situated in the Salkhad District of Suwayda Governorate, in southern Syria. According to the Syria Central Bureau of Statistics (CBS), Burd had a population of 207 in the 2004 census. Its inhabitants are predominantly Druze, with a Sunni Muslim Bedouin minority.

== History ==
In 1596, it appeared in the Ottoman tax registers as Burd (dir nazd Tasil), as part of the nahiya (subdistrict) of Bani Malik as-Sadir, in the Hauran Sanjak. It had an entirely Muslim population consisting of 8 households and 2 bachelors. They paid a fixed tax-rate of 40% on agricultural products, including wheat (750 a.), barley (450 a.), summer crops (700 a.) goats and beehives (100 a.); the taxes totalled 2,000 akçe.

In 1838, Eli Smith noted it as Burd, a ruin located "in the Nukrah, east of Busrah", the Nukrah being the southern Hauran plain.

== See also ==
- Druze in Syria

== Bibliography ==
- Hütteroth, W.-D.; Abdulfattah, K. (1977). Historical Geography of Palestine, Transjordan and Southern Syria in the Late 16th Century. Erlanger Geographische Arbeiten, Sonderband 5. Erlangen, Germany: Vorstand der Fränkischen Geographischen Gesellschaft. ISBN 3-920405-41-2.
- Robinson, E.; Smith, E. (1841). Biblical Researches in Palestine, Mount Sinai and Arabia Petraea: A Journal of Travels in the year 1838. Vol. 3. Boston: Crocker & Brewster.
