= Tayma, Suwayda =

Tayma تيما Tima
- Village
- Location within Syria
- Coordinates: 32°50′10″N 36°45′51″E
- Country: Syria
- Governorate: Suwayda
- District: Shahba
- Subdistrict: Shahba

Population (2004 census)
  - Total: 801
- Time zone: UTC+2 (EET)
  - Summer (DST): UTC+3 (EEST)

Tayma (Arabic: تيما) is a village situated in the Shahba District of Suwayda Governorate, in southern Syria. According to the Syria Central Bureau of Statistics (CBS), Tayma had a population of 801 in the 2004 census. Its inhabitants are predominantly Druze.

== See also ==
- Druze in Syria
