= Masikah =

Masikah مسيكة
- Village
- Location in Syria
- Coordinates: 32°55′10″N 36°18′50″E
- PAL: 273/259
- Country: Syria
- Governorate: Daraa
- District: Izraa
- Subdistrict: Izraa

Population (2004 census)
  - Total: 1,606

Masikah (Arabic: مسيكة) is a village in southern Syria, administratively part of the Izraa District in the Daraa Governorate. According to the Syria Central Bureau of Statistics (CBS), Masikah had a population of 1,606 in the 2004 census. Its inhabitants are predominantly Sunni Muslims.

== History ==
In 1596 it appeared in the Ottoman tax registers as Musayk and was part of the nahiya of Bani Abdullah in the Hauran Sanjak. It had an entirely Muslim population consisting of 10 households and 2 bachelors. They paid a fixed tax-rate of 40% on agricultural products, including wheat (1800 a.), barley (540 a.), summer crops (60 a.), goats and beehives (254 a.), in addition to "occasional revenues" (100 a.); the taxes totalled 2,754 akçe. 5/24 of the revenue went to a waqf.

In 1838, it was noted as a ruin, Museikeh, situated "in the Lejah, west of Dama".

== Religious buildings ==
- Al-Madares Mosque
- Mosque in Masikah al-Gharibiyah
- Mosque in Masikah ash-Sharqiyah

== Bibliography ==
- Hütteroth, W.-D.; Abdulfattah, K. (1977). Historical Geography of Palestine, Transjordan and Southern Syria in the Late 16th Century. Erlanger Geographische Arbeiten, Sonderband 5. Erlangen, Germany: Vorstand der Fränkischen Geographischen Gesellschaft. ISBN 3-920405-41-2.
- Robinson, E.; Smith, E. (1841). Biblical Researches in Palestine, Mount Sinai and Arabia Petraea: A Journal of Travels in the year 1838. Vol. 3. Boston: Crocker & Brewster.
