= Al-Mashqouq =

Al-Mashqouq المشقوق Al-Mashquq
- Village
- Location within Syria
- Coordinates: 32°25′31″N 36°43′38″E
- Country: Syria
- Governorate: Suwayda
- District: Salkhad
- Subdistrict: Salkhad

Population (2004 census)
  - Total: 1,297
- Time zone: UTC+2 (EET)
  - Summer (DST): UTC+3 (EEST)

Al-Mashqouq (Arabic: المشقوق) is a village situated in the Salkhad District of Suwayda Governorate, in southern Syria. According to the Syria Central Bureau of Statistics (CBS), Al-Mashqouq had a population of 1,297 in the 2004 census. Its inhabitants are predominantly Druze.

== Religious buildings ==
- Maqam Abedmar (Druze Shrine)

== See also ==
- Druze in Syria
