= Al-Harisah =

Al-Harisah الحريسة
- Village
- Location within Syria
- Coordinates: 32°35′49″N 36°51′20″E
- PAL: 223/324
- Country: Syria
- Governorate: Suwayda
- District: Salkhad
- Subdistrict: Malah

Population (2004 census)
  - Total: 1,292
- Time zone: UTC+2 (EET)
  - Summer (DST): UTC+3 (EEST)

Al-Harisah (Arabic: الحريسة) is a village situated in the Salkhad District of Suwayda Governorate, in southern Syria. According to the Syria Central Bureau of Statistics (CBS), Al-Harisah had a population of 1,292 in the 2004 census. Its inhabitants are predominantly Druze.

== Religious buildings ==
- Maqam Hazqil (Druze Shrine)

== See also ==
- Druze in Syria
