= Wahid al-Balous =

Syrian leader (1965–2015)

Sheikh Wahid al-Balous
- الشيخ وحيد البلعوس
- Born: Wahid al-Balous; 1965; Syria
- Died: 4 September 2015 (aged 50); Suwayda, Syria
- Cause of death: Assassination by car bomb
- Burial place: Al-Mazraa, Syria
- Children: Laith al-Balous, Fahd al-Balous
- Military career
- Allegiance: Men of Dignity
- Movement: Paramilitary
- Active: 2012–2015
- Religious and military leader: Sheikh
- Nickname: Abu Fahd
- Commands: Men of Dignity
- Known for: Leading Druze opposition to Assad and jihadist groups
- Conflict: Syrian civil war: Battle of Dama

Sheikh Wahid al-Balous (Arabic: الشيخ وحيد البلعوس; 1965 – 4 September 2015) was a Syrian Druze leader and cleric who led the Men of Dignity, a Syrian Druze militia, until his assassination in 2015.

== Life ==
Al-Balous served as a policeman in the 1990s, though he left the position and became a religious figure.

He was an opponent of Bashar al-Assad, Al-Nusra Front and the Islamic State (ISIS). He opposed the forced conscription of Druze into the Syrian army and allowed them to take refuge in his home.

He and his supporters tore down an election tent, took away loudspeakers and took away a woman in the city of Suwayda on 4 April 2014, at an event held by the governor's office which was promoting the 2014 Syrian presidential election; it seemed as though the woman, who had been dancing with a portrait of Assad, was mentally disabled and may have been "coerced".

He fought in the Battle of Dama, which took place in Dama in August 2014, alongside the regime against the Al-Nusra Front, though he turned against it after the battle. "Dozens" of Druze fighters died in the battle, including a brother of al-Balous. According to the Middle East Institute, the battle took place between Bedouins and Druze "popular committees." Following the battle, security officials attempted to detain young men for conscription, but "Druze sheikhs .... intervened by force" and prevented them from being taken.

In January 2015, officers at an Air Force Intelligence Directorate checkpoint attempted to detain a young man for conscription, which led to al-Balous and his men attacking the checkpoint. The following month, Hammoud al-Hinnawi, Youssef Jarbou, and Hikmat al-Hijri, who act as Druze religious leaders in Syria, released "a statement disowning al-Balous", which was condemned by Walid Jumblatt, a Druze leader in Lebanon.

Ali Mamlouk, the head of the National Security Bureau, visited the governorate and met with Ba'ath Party members and security officials; al-Balous' supporters met at his al-Mazraa home where, in response, al-Balous launched a fiery speech. Al-Balous stated that "We know about the decision of Ali Mamlouk and others to liquidate us. We say to them: do your worst."

== Death ==
He was assassinated in Suwayda, in the "Ain al-Marj region" by a car bomb on 4 September 2015, which killed many other Druze leaders. According to an analysis by Aymenn Jawad Al-Tamimi, many of the killed were from Bayraq Al Nu'aim. The convoy of vehicles with which he was traveling was also targeted by gunmen, which resulted in the wounding of his two sons, Fahd, and Laith, as well as his brother, Ra’fat.

Over 40 people were killed in a second blast, which took place near National Hospital in Suwayda.

Members of the opposition blamed the Syrian Government for the blasts. Eight government loyalists were killed the same night as his assassination, according to the Syrian Observatory for Human Rights, following the storming of two local security branches in Suwayda by residents, some of whom were armed.

Syrian state television reported that the killer was a Druze named Wafi Abu Trabi, who it alleged was a member of the Al-Nusra Front, but his confession was disregarded by a local activist named Tarek Abdul-Hai. Abu Trabi, who was an aide of al-Balous, led anti-Assad demonstrations after al-Balous' death. He was ambushed by the Syrian military and Druze factions working with Assad and died in February 2016 in the custody of the Assad regime. According to a document released by the Second Military Field Court in August 2018, he died in May 2016.

Several weeks after his death, the three Sheikhs of Reason spoke at a meeting with Wafiq Nasser, who headed the Military Intelligence Directorate in Suwayda, indicating that they had given Nasser permission to eliminate the Men of Dignity group.

Al-Balous' grave, which was located in Al-Mazraa, was reportedly "desecrated" by fighters affiliated with the Suwayda Military Council.

== Family ==
He had two sons, one named Laith al-Balous and another named Fahd al-Balous, both of whom joined the Sheikh al-Karama Forces after the death of their father. Laith has worked with the Syrian transitional government after the 2024 fall of the Assad regime, meeting with Syrian defense minister Murhaf Abu Qasra in April 2025.
