= Al-Tha'lah Military Airbase =

Syrian Airforce Base

Al-Tha'lah Military Airbase مطار الثعلة العسكري
- IATA: none; ICAO: OS60

Summary
- Airport type: Military
- Owner: (Syria) Syrian Armed Forces
- Operator: Syrian Air Force
- Location: West of Al-Tha'lah, Suwayda Governorate, Syria
- Coordinates: 32°42′43.6″N 36°25′29.9″E

Map

Al-Tha'lah Military Airbase (Arabic: مطار الثعلة العسكري) is a military airbase located to the west of the village of Al-Tha'lah in Suwayda Governorate, southern Syria. It lies approximately 13 kilometers from the city of Suwayda and consists of 16 aircraft shelters and two runways, each 3 kilometers in length, and is equipped with short-range frequency radars.

The airbase covers an area approximately 4 kilometers in length and 2.5 kilometers in width. In its southeastern section, it contains residential quarters designated for officers. The base also has a direct access road leading to the city center of Suwayda via Al-Tha'lah, located on its eastern side.

== History ==
The Southern Front captured part of the base in June 2015 during the Daraa and Suwayda offensive, though the Assad regime retook control of it, with the assistance of Druze militias.

== See also ==
- List of Syrian Air Force bases
