= Al-Ushayib =

Al-Ushayib اشهيب الشمالي Ushayib ash-Shamali
- Village
- Location within Syria
- Coordinates: 33°04′54″N 36°40′36″E
- Country: Syria
- Governorate: Suwayda
- District: Shahba
- Subdistrict: Sawra as-Saghira

Population (2004 census)
  - Total: 1,262
- Time zone: UTC+2 (EET)
  - Summer (DST): UTC+3 (EEST)

Al-Ushayib (Arabic: الاشهيب) is a village situated in the Shahba District of Suwayda Governorate, in southern Syria. According to the Syria Central Bureau of Statistics (CBS), Al-Ushayib had a population of 1,262 in the 2004 census. Its inhabitants are predominantly Sunni Muslim Bedouins.

Bedouin villages near al-Ushayib: Shinwan, al-Asfar, al-Muftara, as-Saqiyah, Banat Baeir, Siret Alya, Tall Ushayib, Rajm Dawlah, al-Qasr, Haytalah, Abu Harat and Khirbet Umm Atayiq.

The Bedouin villages were formerly strongholds of the Islamic State in the Suwayda Governorate.
