= Majadel, Suwayda =

Majadel مجادل
- Village
- Location within Syria
- Coordinates: 32°54′56″N 36°32′59″E
- PAL: 295/258
- Country: Syria
- Governorate: Suwayda
- District: Shahba
- Subdistrict: Shahba

Population (2004 census)
  - Total: 1,832
- Time zone: UTC+2 (EET)
  - Summer (DST): UTC+3 (EEST)

Majadel (Arabic: مجادل) is a village situated in the Shahba District of Suwayda Governorate, in southern Syria. According to the Syria Central Bureau of Statistics (CBS), Majadel had a population of 1,832 in the 2004 census. Its inhabitants are predominantly Druze, with a Sunni Muslim Bedouin minority.

== History ==
In 1596, it appeared in Ottoman tax registers under the name of Majadil, located in the nahiya of Bani Miglad in the Qada Hawran. It was noted as being "Hali" (=empty) at the time, but taxes were still paid, a lump sum of 5,000 akçe.

== Religious buildings ==
- Maqam Abu Dharr al-Ghifari (Druze Shrine)

== See also ==
- Druze in Syria

== Bibliography ==
- Hütteroth, W.-D.; Abdulfattah, K. (1977). Historical Geography of Palestine, Transjordan and Southern Syria in the Late 16th Century. Erlanger Geographische Arbeiten, Sonderband 5. Erlangen, Germany: Vorstand der Fränkischen Geographischen Gesellschaft. ISBN 3-920405-41-2.
