= Umm Dubayb =

Umm Dubayb أم ضبيب
- Village
- Location within Syria
- Coordinates: 32°49′40″N 36°44′27″E
- Country: Syria
- Governorate: Suwayda
- District: Shahba
- Subdistrict: Shahba

Population (2004 census)
  - Total: 770
- Time zone: UTC+2 (EET)
  - Summer (DST): UTC+3 (EEST)

Umm Dubayb (Arabic: أم ضبيب) is a village situated in the Shahba District of Suwayda Governorate, in southern Syria. According to the Syria Central Bureau of Statistics (CBS), Umm Dubayb had a population of 770 in the 2004 census. Its inhabitants are predominantly Druze.

== Religious buildings ==
- Maqam al-Khidr (Druze Shrine)

== See also ==
- Druze in Syria
