= Dhakir, Suwayda =

Dhakir ذكير Zakir, Thakir
- Village
- Location within Syria
- Coordinates: 33°02′44″N 36°32′59″E
- Country: Syria
- Governorate: Suwayda
- District: Shahba
- Subdistrict: Sawra as-Saghira

Population (2004 census)
  - Total: 519
- Time zone: UTC+2 (EET)
  - Summer (DST): UTC+3 (EEST)

Dhakir (Arabic: ذكير, romanized: Dhakīr) is a village situated in the Shahba District of Suwayda Governorate, in southern Syria. According to the Syria Central Bureau of Statistics (CBS), Dhakir had a population of 519 in the 2004 census. Its inhabitants are predominantly Druze.

== Archaeology ==
A temple at Dhakir was reportedly converted into a church and excavated, as noted by Sartre-Fauriat and Sartre, though no further published record of this excavation is known. Dentzer-Feydy instead describes scattered temple remains reused in the village's modern houses, including a cornice fragment carved with an S-shaped vine motif comparable to decoration found at other rural sanctuaries in the Hauran region. Bounni dates these architectural fragments to the 2nd–3rd century AD.

Sculptural finds from the temple area include fragments of a female figure wearing Athena's aegis, along with depictions of a horse and an eagle. A cuirassed torso belonging to a Roman soldier and a weathered male head were also recovered. Roman military presence at the site is further suggested by an inscribed architectural block, found during excavation in the eastern part of the village, interpreted by Sartre-Fauriat and Sartre as a dedication by a centurion. A separate inscription refers to an unnamed deity described with the epithet "holy."

== Religious buildings ==
- Maqam Shayth/Seth (Druze Shrine)

== See also ==
- Druze in Syria
