= Al-Karis =

Al-Karis الكارس
- Village
- Location within Syria
- Coordinates: 32°32′00″N 36°41′31″E
- Country: Syria
- Governorate: Suwayda
- District: Salkhad
- Subdistrict: Salkhad

Population (2004 census)
  - Total: 619
- Time zone: UTC+2 (EET)
  - Summer (DST): UTC+3 (EEST)

Al-Karis (Arabic: الكارس) is a village situated in the Salkhad District of Suwayda Governorate, in southern Syria. According to the Syria Central Bureau of Statistics (CBS), Al-Karis had a population of 619 in the 2004 census. Its inhabitants are predominantly Druze.

== See also ==
- Druze in Syria
