= Umm Shamah =

Umm Shamah أم شامة
- Village
- Location within Syria
- Coordinates: 32°29′04″N 36°58′20″E
- Country: Syria
- Governorate: Suwayda
- District: Salkhad
- Subdistrict: Malah

Population (2004 census)
  - Total: 31
- Time zone: UTC+2 (EET)
  - Summer (DST): UTC+3 (EEST)

Umm Shamah (Arabic: أم شامة) is a village situated in the Salkhad District of Suwayda Governorate, in southern Syria. According to the Syria Central Bureau of Statistics (CBS), Umm Shamah had a population of 31 in the 2004 census. Its inhabitants are predominantly Sunni Muslim Bedouins.
