= Al-Munaydhreh =

Al-Munaydhreh المنيذرة Al-Muneithreh
- Village
- Location within Syria
- Coordinates: 32°30′28″N 36°39′35″E
- Country: Syria
- Governorate: Suwayda
- District: Salkhad
- Subdistrict: Salkhad

Population (2004 census)
  - Total: 1,138
- Time zone: UTC+2 (EET)
  - Summer (DST): UTC+3 (EEST)

Al-Munaydhreh (Arabic: المنيذرة) is a village situated in the Salkhad District of Suwayda Governorate, in southern Syria. According to the Syria Central Bureau of Statistics (CBS), Al-Munaydhreh had a population of 1,138 in the 2004 census. Its inhabitants are predominantly Druze.

== Religious buildings ==
- Maqam Abu al-Heej (Druze Shrine)

== See also ==
- Druze in Syria
