= Daraa and As-Suwayda offensive (June 2015) =

Military operation in Syria

Coordinates: 32.7398°N 36.3249°E

- Part of the Syrian Civil War
- Map showing the rebel advances and government counterattack
Date	9–18 June 2015 (1 week and 2 days)
Location	Daraa Governorate and As-Suwayda Governorate, Syria
Result	Partial Southern Front-led rebel victory
Territorial changes	Rebels capture Brigade 52, al-Rakham, al-Meleha al-Gharbia, al-Koum checkpoint and Sakakah; SAA recaptures Sakakah; Rebels temporally seized the western half of the Al-Tha'lah airbase, before being forced to retreat the next day

Belligerents
Free Syrian Army; Islamic Front	(Syria) Syrian Arab Republic; Druze armed groups

Commanders and leaders
Col. Ziad Salamat (WIA); Lt. Col. Najm; Bashar al-Zoubi	(Syria) Brig. Gen. Issam Zahreddine (Syria) Brig. Gen. Abdul-karim al-Haimi (Al-Tha'lah airbase commander) (Syria) Brigade 52 garrison commander (Syria) Col. Loay al-Salem † (head air intelligence in as-Suwayda) (Syria) Col. Wael Kamel Hadad †

Units involved
Southern Front: Amoud Houran Brigade; Yarmouk Army; First Army; Usood al-Harb; Jaysh al-Islam; Ahrar al-Sham	Syrian Armed Forces; Syrian Army; 1st Corps; 9th Armoured Division; 52nd Mechanized Brigade; National Defense Force; Popular Committees; Eagles of the Whirlwind; Jaysh al-Muwahhideen; Bayraq Quwat al-Fahad; Humat ad Diyar

Strength
2,000 (Southern Front claim)	Unknown

Casualties and losses
36 killed (SOHR claim) 125+ killed (government claim)	28 killed and 3 captured (SOHR claim); 83 killed (Southern Front claim); 1 Sukhoi Su-24 aircraft lost 7 BMP-1s & 3 T-72 tanks captured

The Daraa and As-Suwayda offensive (June 2015) (titled "The battle of the crushing of the tyrants" by the Southern Front) was launched in eastern Daraa Governorate during the Syrian Civil War, by the Southern Front and allied Islamic Front rebel group against government positions in and around the 52nd Mechanized Brigade base (Liwa 52), which housed an infantry unit, an artillery battalion and a T-72 tank battalion. The offensive moved directly onto nearby Al-Tha'lah airbase in western As-Suwayda Governorate after the swift capture of Brigade 52. However, after initially managing to capture parts of the airbase, the rebels were forced to withdraw.

== The offensive ==
=== Brigade 52 base ===
On 9 June, the Southern Front launched the offensive after evacuating the residents of al-Hirak for "security reasons" on 7 June. After less than six hours of fighting, the Brigade 52 base (which was the largest government-held base in Daraa), the town of al-Meleha al-Gharbia and al-Rakham village were captured. The rebels fired more than 100 missiles at the base during the attack. Opposition forces were seen using French APILAS anti-tank weapons for the first time in this battle. The Army retreated to the Al-Tha'lah airbase, while the Syrian Air Force covered the retreat. According to the SOHR, 35 rebels, including three commanders, and 28 soldiers were killed. The military made no comments about the loss of the base.

=== Al-Tha'lah airbase ===
On 10 June, rebels announced the start of the battle for the Al-Tha'lah airbase in western As-Suwayda Governorate (which has a mostly Druze population, and few Muslims) and began targeting it with mortars and artillery. Rebels seized the al-Koum checkpoint and Sakakah village to the east of Brigade 52 and near the airbase.

By 11 June, rebels had captured parts of Al-Tha'lah airbase, with a Southern Front spokesman stating that they expected to capture the entire base by the end of the day. Government reinforcements were sent to the area and managed to recapture parts of the airbase. The reinforcements included NDF and Jaysh al-Muwahhideen (Druze militia) fighters. The next day, the rebel attack on the airbase was repelled, with the rebels retreating from the western part of the base they had captured the day before. Al Jazeera reported that fighting at the airbase continued amid more than 70 airstrikes in the area as rebels attempted to capture a town near the base and cut military supply lines. Later, it was confirmed the military had regained full control of the airbase. The state news agency SANA reported the rebels suffered heavy casualties in the failed attack on the airbase, with at least 100 militants being killed.

The Southern Front claimed that they pulled out of Al-Tha'lah airbase due to ongoing negotiations with the Druze community and the killing of 23 Druze villagers in Idlib, which had complicated the situation. Several days later, a new claim, by the pro-opposition Syrian Mirror, asserted that the assault was called off after the Southern Front operations room in Jordan disagreed with the direction of the offensive, having not green-lighted the taking of Al-Tha'lah airbase. Southern Front member's wages were stopped to convince them to cease the attack. Rebels saw Druze involvement in the government militias as key to stopping the opposition advance on the airbase, while Bashar al-Zoubi, the head of a group leading the attack, asserted Assad was exploiting sectarianism and that the Druze know the "regime is collapsing and cannot protect them", while also claiming that there was coordination between the opposition and "the sheikhs of Sweida."

Meanwhile, on 11 June, rebels of the Southern Front reportedly shot down a SyAAF MiG passing over the Brigade 52 base with AA fire. State TV denied the MiG was shot down and instead said it crashed due to a technical failure and that the pilot successfully managed to eject himself. The SOHR also reported on conflicting accounts of what caused the crash and the fate of the pilot. Footage later emerged of opposition forces using a SA-7 MANPADS.

On 14 June 17 Daraa-based rebel groups belonging to the Free Syrian Army and Islamic Front signed a statement in which they assured the Druze that they weren't after a sectarian war. Major Essam al-Rayes stated that there would be further attempts to control the airbase, but no plans to seize areas of Sweida province.

On 15 June, the SAA, backed by Druze militia, repelled another rebel assault on the airbase, leaving 25 rebels dead, after rebels initially advanced into the airbase. According to the SOHR, about 20 government fighters were killed and wounded in the attack, while the SAA reported seven soldiers and officers killed, including Colonel Loay al-Salem (head of the air intelligence in as-Suwayda) and 23 wounded that day. The following day, the rebels announced they had halted their operations at Al-Tha'lah.

In the end, despite seizing the Brigade 52 base, the rebels failed to capture the main road to the capital Damascus.

Some of the Druze fighters who deployed resigned in protest after they were sent to fight in their governorate, though the government promised they would not be. They also attacked an office of the ruling party.

== Army counter-attack ==
On 17 June, Druze militia, backed by the 5th Armored Division, launched a counter-attack on rebel positions near the al-Thala airbase and recaptured Sakakah and its hill by the next day.

On 27 June, government forces advanced near Tell Sheikh Hussein, to the south of the airbase, and reportedly captured the hill.

== Strategic analysis ==
The Brigade 52 base has been described as the "most important", largest and heavily equipped army base in Daraa province, as well as a "key military base." Its capture would bring the rebels "very close" to the al-Tha'lah airbase. According to Syria Direct, the fall of the base leaves the government with only two military garrisons along the main supply line between Damascus and Daraa city. The collapse of the military's defense of the strategic Brigade 52 base in the south has been seen as part of a pattern of defeats for the government, with Charles Lister, a visiting fellow at the Brookings Doha Center stating "What seems to be happening is a redrawing of the power map in Syria, with the regime seemingly more willing to cede territory outside of its most critically valuable zones." An analyst from the Institute for Strategic Studies stated that the fall of the base to the Southern Front weakens the government's defenses around the capital of Damascus, and bolsters opposition control of Daraa province which stands at 70%; Southern Front spokesman Issam al-Reis stated that "We have most of Daraa liberated, our lines of defense behind us are solid, and now we can start the operation toward Damascus and the highway leading to it". The government had reportedly been aware of the impending offensive for months and the speed with which the Brigade 52 base fell, in the opinion of Stratfor, indicated how weakened the Syrian military had become.

== Reactions ==
=== Domestic reaction ===
- Syrian Druze – Druze leader Sheikh Wahid al-Balous issued a statement stating that the rebel offensive was focused on the Thaaleh airport, not the nearby Druze village of the same name, and also urging the Druze of As-Suwayda Governorate to avoid being swayed by social media which he said was trying to spread "fear and confusion". In addition, a pro-opposition source claimed, based on Druze sources, that Balous issued an order to arrest Brigadier General Wafiq Nasser, the government's head of the Military Intelligence Directorate in As-Suwayda Governorate.
- Southern Front - The Southern Front issued a statement condemning "in the strongest terms" the Druze killings in Idlib, and further stated "We stress that the people of Sweida are our brothers and our people, and we... will not fight them." The Southern Front sought to distance itself from Al-Nusra and not cooperate with the group since March 2015, but still found itself fighting on the same side as the Al-Qaeda group affiliate, including in battles against the Islamic State. On 14 June, a Southern Front spokesperson again reiterated that "We are not working with them, and they are not allowed to work with us" in regards to Nusra.

=== International reaction ===
- Lebanon – The killing of the 20 Druze villagers in Idlib prompted the Lebanese Druze party chief and former government minister Wiam Wahhab to urge the Druze to form an armed force to defend their community in an angry televised speech saying "We will not accept to sell Druze blood!". His call was much in line with that of the Syrian Druze spiritual leader. Lebanon's most influential Druze leader, Walid Jumblatt, rejected the idea, calling instead for an emergency meeting of a Druze religious council. Jumblatt urged the Druze in southern Syria to abandon the Syrian government and unite with other communities, stating that "reconciliation with the people of Houran [a region of Daraa]" would protect them from "dangers".

== See also ==
- Battle of Nasib Border Crossing
- Battle of Bosra (2015)
- Jaysh al-Muwahhideen
- Druze in Syria
