= Uyun =

Uyun عيون
- Village
- Location within Syria
- Coordinates: 32°31′46″N 36°42′42″E
- PAL: 311/216
- Country: Syria
- Governorate: Suwayda
- District: Salkhad
- Subdistrict: Salkhad

Population (2004 census)
  - Total: 534
- Time zone: UTC+2 (EET)
  - Summer (DST): UTC+3 (EEST)

Uyun (Arabic: عيون) is a village situated in the Salkhad District of Suwayda Governorate, in southern Syria. According to the Syria Central Bureau of Statistics (CBS), Uyun had a population of 534 in the 2004 census. Its inhabitants are predominantly Druze.

== Religious buildings ==
- Maqam Abu al-Hur (Druze Shrine)

== See also ==
- Druze in Syria
