= Al-Huquf =

Al-Huquf الحقف
- Village
- Location within Syria
- Coordinates: 33°00′08″N 36°42′35″E
- PAL: 310/268
- Country: Syria
- Governorate: Suwayda
- District: Shahba
- Subdistrict: Sawra as-Saghira

Population (2004 census)
  - Total: 455
- Time zone: UTC+2 (EET)
  - Summer (DST): UTC+3 (EEST)

Al-Huquf (Arabic: الحقف) is a village situated in the Shahba District of Suwayda Governorate, in southern Syria. According to the Syria Central Bureau of Statistics (CBS), Al-Huquf had a population of 455 in the 2004 census. Its inhabitants are predominantly Druze.

== See also ==
- Druze in Syria
