= Al-Mughayyir, Suwayda =

Al-Mughayyir المغير
- Village
- Location within Syria
- Coordinates: 32°20′56″N 36°41′19″E
- PAL: 309/195
- Country: Syria
- Governorate: Suwayda
- District: Salkhad
- Subdistrict: Ghariyah

Population (2004 census)
  - Total: 615
- Time zone: UTC+2 (EET)
  - Summer (DST): UTC+3 (EEST)

Al-Mughayyir (Arabic: المغير) is a village situated in the Salkhad District of Suwayda Governorate, in southern Syria. According to the Syria Central Bureau of Statistics (CBS), Al-Mughayyir had a population of 615 in the 2004 census. Its inhabitants are predominantly Druze.

== History ==
In 1596 it appeared in the Ottoman tax registers as Mugayyir as-Sarqi and was part of the nahiya of Butayna in the Qada Hauran. It had an all Muslim population consisting of 7 households and 4 bachelors. The villagers paid a fixed tax rate of 40% on various agricultural products, including wheat (750 a.), barley 450 a.), summer crops (500 a.), goats and/or beehives (200 a.), in addition to "occasional revenues" (100 a.); a total of 2,000 akçe.

== See also ==
- Druze in Syria

== Bibliography ==
- Hütteroth, W.-D.; Abdulfattah, K. (1977). Historical Geography of Palestine, Transjordan and Southern Syria in the Late 16th Century. Erlanger Geographische Arbeiten, Sonderband 5. Erlangen, Germany: Vorstand der Fränkischen Geographischen Gesellschaft. ISBN 3-920405-41-2.
