= Battle of Dama =

2014 Jihadist–Druze clashes

- Part of the Syrian civil war
Date	16 - 20 August 2014 (4 days)
Location	Dama and Deir Dama, Suwayda Governorate 32°57′10″N 36°25′51″E
Result	Druze victory: Al-Nusra Front expelled from Suwayda Governorate; Beginning of the opposition of Wahid al-Balous to Ba'athist Syria

Belligerents
al-Nusra Front; Sunni Bedouin tribes	Druze armed groups Ba'athist Syria

Commanders and leaders
(al-Nusra Front) Abu Mohammad al-Julani	Wahid al-Balous

Units involved
al-Nusra Front	Men of Dignity; Jaysh al-Muwahhidin (Ba'athist Syria) Popular Committees

Casualties and losses
(al-Nusra Front) Unknown	18 fighters killed

The Battle of Dama (Arabic: معركة داما), also known as the al-Karama battle (Arabic: معركة الكرامة, lit. 'Battle of dignity') by the Men of Dignity, was a battle for the city of Dama, Suwayda carried out by Druze militants against the Al-Nusra Front.

== Battle ==
The battle began on 16 August 2014, following the bombing of the city of Dama and Deir Dama, in the rural area of Suwayda Governorate either by the Al-Nusra Front, affiliated with Al-Qaeda, or by Sunni Bedouin tribes, due to disagreements over grazing in Suwayda Governorate.

Wahid al-Balous, a well-known Druze sheikh, fought in the battle alongside Ba'athist Syria, with other pro-Assad militias, such as Jaysh al-Muwahhidin and Popular Committees. The battle ended on 20 August 2014.

== Aftermath ==
18 Druze fighters died in the battle, among them the brother of Wahid al-Balous.

The battle was known as "al-Karama battle" or "battle of dignity" and the groups that participated in it were called the Men of Dignity thereafter. At the funeral, held in the city's municipal stadium, Wahid al-Balous appeared and declared himself to be the leader of the group Men of Dignity, in addition to declaring that the Ba'athist Syria "shot his men in the back".

In September 2015, a car bomb exploded, killing al-Balous. The person whom the Assad regime declared responsible for the act was a militant from Al-Nusra Front, Wafi Abu Trabi.

== See also ==
- Qalb Loze massacre - Massacre committed in Qalb Loze by Al-Nusra Front against Druze
- Druze insurgency in Southern Syria (2025–present) - Clashes after the Fall of Assad between Druze and Sunni Bedouin tribes.
