= Faisal al-Qassem =

British-Syrian television personality

Faisal Al-Qasim
- فيصل القاسم
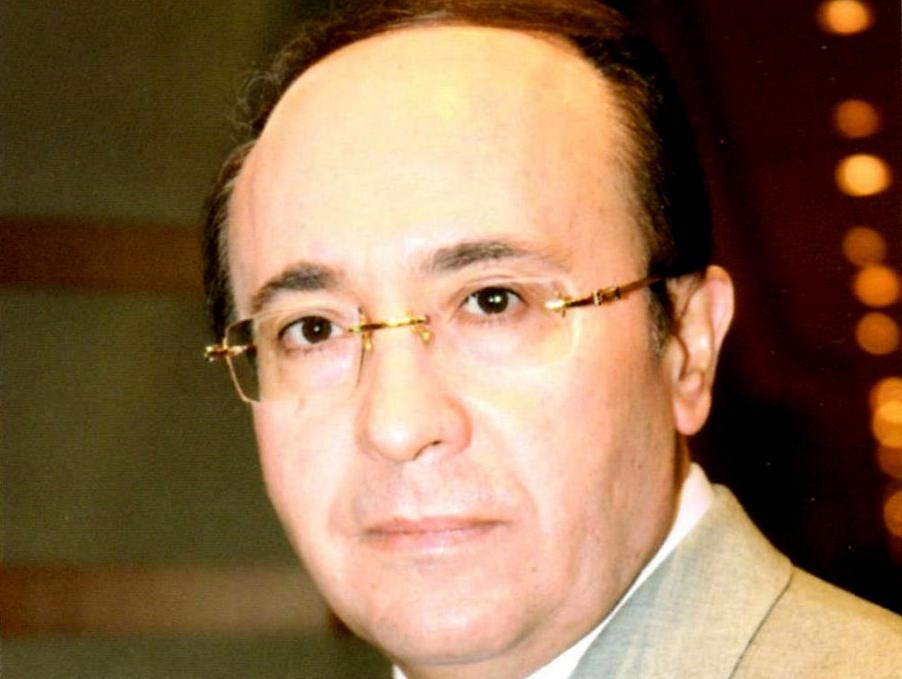
- Born: June 3, 1961 (age 65); Al-Thaalah, Al-Suwayda Governorate, Syria, United Arab Republic
- Education: Damascus University; University of Hull
- Occupation: Talk show host
- Years active: 1994–present

Faisal Al-Qasim (Arabic: فيصل القاسم; born June 3, 1961), also written as Faisal Al-Kasim is a British-Syrian television personality based in Qatar, who is known for hosting the controversial live debate show The Opposite Direction (Arabic: الاتجاه المعاكس) on Al Jazeera, where two guests with contradicting points of views debate on various topics but mostly topics related to politics of the Arab world. Fights break out on some occasions.

Al-Qassim is known for his provocative on-screen style and is frequently credited with playing a large part in Al Jazeera's reputation in the Arab world as willing to break taboos and potentially offend individuals and states. He was listed by Arabian Business Magazine as one of the top most influential Arab personalities for the year 2007, ranked as 64th.

== Early life ==
Faisal Al-Qassim was born in 1961 in the village of Al-Tha'lah, Al-Suwayda Governorate, Syria. He is from the Druze religious minority in Syria. He graduated in 1983 from the University of Damascus with a degree in English Literature. Later, in 1989, he obtained a PhD in English literature from the University of Hull with a thesis entitled Iconoclasm in Modern British Drama.

As a child born into a poor family, Al-Qassim had to work various jobs including metalwork, harvesting, street cleaning, electrical work, and more tedious tasks. Since then, he dreamt of leaving that world to work in something that would allow him to have a public presence and voice. He had a very strong interest in radio and television and used to go to the city to watch television through windows of various houses. He once got caught doing so by a homeowner who accused him of being a thief. After hearing his story, however, he allowed him to enter the house and watch television with the family. Al Qassim's family were able to buy a black and white television set of their own after electricity was introduced to his village. Al-Qassim originally aspired to become a weather report presenter on television.

== Career ==
=== Work in Media ===
Before joining Al Jazeera, Al-Qassem worked for the BBC Arabic Radio and TV for over eight years as producer and anchor of political and cultural programs.

- 1994-1996: Worked as a news presenter and host for the show "Behind the News" on BBC television.
- 1993-1996: News journalist for The Arab Emirates Radio in London.
- 1991: Producer and presenter of The Journalism Show for MBC channel.
- 1989-1988: Producer and presenter of cultural shows in the Arab department at BBC.
- Producer and presenter of multiple entertainment and music shows at BBC, including "Adwaa Wa Qadaya" (Lights and Cases), "Araa Wa Maraya" (Opinions and Mirrors), and others.
- Producer and presenter of several political programs at BBC, including "Al-Aalam Hatha Al Sabaah" (The World This Morning), "Aalam Al Thaheera" (Afternoon World), and others.
- Has many article contributions in Syrian newspapers.
- 1988-1992: Has many article contributions in "Al-Hayat" (Life), "Al-Sharq Al-Awsat" (The Middle East), and "Huna London" (This is London) newspapers.
- Has many article contributions is=n American Magazines.
- Writes a weekly article in "Al-Sharq" (The East) Qatari Newspaper until today.
- 1996: Joined Al-Jazeera as a news and show presenter.
- 1997: Launched "The Opposite Direction" show.

=== The Opposite Direction ===
"The Opposite Direction" is regarded as probably the most controversial talk show in the history of Arab television. It is also one of the most popular, and has drawn official protest and complaints from officials. It is similar to CNN's Crossfire, and is a political debate show that features guests who hold opposing opinions and debate a controversial topic. Hugh Miles writes in his book on Al-Jazeera "the show has been the source of numerous international disputes and instigated the severance of diplomatic relations with several neighboring countries." Dr. Faisal Al-Qassem prepares the show himself, researching, writing, and presenting it single-handedly. Through it, he has become one of the most famous faces in the Arab World. Al-Qassem's program has led to diplomatic crises between the state of Qatar, where Al Jazeera is based, and several Arab countries, five of which withdrew their ambassadors from Doha in protest over the program. Faisal Al-Qassem has stated that his mission is to liberate the Arab World from dictatorship, despots, and traditions. He believes that Al-Jazeera and his show have been successful in doing that.

=== Publications ===
Al-Qassem has published the following book titles in Arabic:

- Politics and Literature (Arabic: السياسة والأدب)
- Memorize and Shut-Up (Arabic: احفظ واخرس)
- The Missing Dialogue in Arab Culture (Arabic: الحوار المفقود في الثقافة العربية)

== Views & criticisms ==
Al-Qassem has been viewed in many cases as a big supporter of the 2011 Arab revolutions, by fueling them and spreading awareness through his show "The Opposite Direction". His colleague and friend, Yahya Abo-Zakariya, describes the introductory scenes of the show presented by Al-Qassem as more like revolution statements, backed up with dramatic music effects that made them sound very powerful. The show became a fuel to the revolutions and has allowed the accumulation of awareness on revolt and public awakening which in turn played a part in creating a situation of the Arab revolt against the current situation.

Nonetheless, Al-Qassem has been widely criticized by various people for different reasons. He has been criticized for his selection of guests, such as for the episode on the alleged terrorist armed gangs of Syria, where he hosted a military personality to debate with a Lebanese author, where the military personality was viewed as incompetent and inappropriate for such a debate. In addition, a Syrian blogger has criticized and attacked him, describing him as sectarian due to his selection of pro-government guests only from the Christian sect to debate with opposition figures mainly from the Muslim-Sunni sect, accusing him of trying to give the revolution a sectarian appearance.

Also, Al-Qassem's statements that described the Yemeni people as drunks due to their high percentage of qat drug addiction raised a huge amount of criticism on him and his show among Yemenis. Some have even demanded a public apology from him for insulting the Yemeni people.

On February 13, 2019, Israeli comedienne Noam Shuster-Eliassi, speaking to i24 News, joked that she would like to marry the Crown Prince of Saudi Arabia. On February 17, Al-Qassem posted on his Facebook account about Shuster-Eliassi's comment. Subsequently, BBC Arabic and Al Jazeera covered the story as if Shuster-Eliassi's proposal were genuine.

== Personal life ==
Al-Kasim is married to a Syrian woman who comes from the same village and has 3 children, a girl, Saba, and two boys, Aseel and Adam. Outside his work in media, Al-Kasim enjoys a range of interests and pastimes including internet surfing, shopping, and listening to music.

== See also ==
- List of Druze
