= Anti-Terrorism Force =

Militia in the Syrian civil war

- Kawa Makafah al-Arhab
- Leader: Samer Hakim
- Dates active: July 2021–June 2022 approx. July 2025–August 2025
- Merged into: National Guard
- Country: Syria
- Active regions: Suwayda Governorate
- Size: 700
- Wars: Syrian civil war; Syrian conflict (2024–present); Druze insurgency in Southern Syria (2025–present); Southern Syria clashes (July 2025–present)

The Anti-Terrorism Force (Arabic: قوة مكافحة الإرهاب, romanized: Quwwat Mukafaht al-Irha'ab), also known as the Counter-Terrorism Force, was a Druze militia that was affiliated with the Syrian Brigade Party. It merged into the Druze-led National Guard in August 2025.

== Activities ==
The organization was established by the Syrian Brigade Party.

Members of the group met with the Security Committee in Suwayda in August 2021, which threatened to bomb their headquarters.

There were clashes between the Raji Falhout group and other groups, following the seizure of a seller and a university student in September 2021, in an attempt by the Raji Falhout group to force the release of a member of Military Intelligence who had been taken by the Anti-Terrorism Force (ATF). A member of the Falhout group was captured by the ATF and his confession was aired on Facebook.

The group clashed with members of the National Defence Forces in September 2021.

The armed group had seized Jawdat Hamza, who was reportedly involved in drug trafficking, and delivered him to the US military stationed at the Al-Tanf base.

Around 40 members of the group were attacked by over 500 members of various Assad regime-aligned militias, including Hezbollah, as well as Druze and Bedouin fighters on 8 June 2022. Marei al-Ramthan, a regime-affiliated smuggler, was also involved in the attack on the ATF, alongside his militia. Some members of the ATF unsuccessfully attempted to reach the American Al-Tanf base, and were ambushed. The groups leader, Samer Hakim, was besieged in the village of Imtan, where he "refused to surrender" and shot himself.

The seizure of Hakim's body from the As-Suwayda National Hospital by militia members affiliated with Zaafar Jaafar, the father of known drug trafficker Ahmed Jaafar, both of whom had ties with Hezbollah, was confirmed by hospital staff and a member of the Druze political party.

The group is active again as of July 2025 and has cut ties with the al-Sharaa government following a speech by Druze leader Hikmat al-Hijri criticizing the government. It reportedly includes "Dir’ al-Tawhid, Forces of Al-Ulya, Sheikh al-Karama, Saraya al-Jabal, and Jaysh al-Muwahideen." In August 2025, the group merged into the Druze-led National Guard.
