= Al-Aanat =

Al-Aanat العانات
- Village
- Location within Syria
- Coordinates: 32°21′03″N 36°48′26″E
- Country: Syria
- Governorate: Suwayda
- District: Salkhad
- Subdistrict: Salkhad

Population (2004 census)
  - Total: 413
- Time zone: UTC+2 (EET)
  - Summer (DST): UTC+3 (EEST)

Al-Aanat (Arabic: العانات) is a village situated in the Salkhad District of Suwayda Governorate, in southern Syria. According to the Syria Central Bureau of Statistics (CBS), Al-Aanat had a population of 413 in the 2004 census. Its inhabitants are predominantly Druze.

== Religious buildings ==
- Maqam Salman Al-Farsi (Druze Shrine)

== See also ==
- Druze in Syria
