= Sultan Pasha al-Atrash Battalion =

- Arabic: كتيبة سلطان باشا الاطرش
- Logo of the group
- Leaders: First Lieutenant Khaldoun Sami Zinedine †; 1st Lt. Fadlallah Sami Zinedine; 1st Lt. Amira Abu Hasas
- Dates active: November 2011 – January 2014
- Active regions: Suwayda Governorate; Daraa Governorate
- Ideology: Syrian nationalism
- Part of: (Syrian opposition) Free Syrian Army: Suwayda Revolutionary Military Council
- Wars: the Syrian Civil War

The Sultan Pasha al-Atrash Battalion (Arabic: كتيبة سلطان باشا الاطرش) was an armed Syrian rebel group affiliated with the Free Syrian Army that operated in southern Syria during the first 3 years of the Syrian Civil War. The group consisted of rebels from the Druze community in Syria, particularly in the Suwayda Governorate. The group disbanded in the beginning of 2014 after frequent attacks on it by Sunni Islamist groups, particularly al-Qaeda's al-Nusra Front.

== History ==
The founder and first commander of the group was First Lieutenant Khaldoun Sami Zinedine, a defector from the Syrian Armed Forces. Zinedine defected near Damascus, moved to the Daraa Governorate, and joined the Free Officers Brigade in October 2011. In December 2011, he announced the formation of the Sultan Pasha al-Atrash Battalion. The group stated that its goal was to protect demonstrators in and around Suwayda. In July 2012, the group blew up a Syrian Air Force ammunition depot in the Thula Military Airbase near Suwayda.

In January 2013, the Sultan Pasha al-Atrash Battalion launched an offensive against Syrian government forces in Dahr al-Jabal, near Suwayda. On 23 January, 1st Lt. Khaldoun Zinedine was killed in action during the offensive, which was repelled by government forces and a number of his fighters were "wiped out". After his death, Khaldoun was succeeded by his brother, 1st Lt. Fadlallah Zinedine, as the commander of the group.

Tensions between the group and Sunni Islamist groups cumulated through 2013. The group initially cooperated with the Dawn of Islam Brigade in Daraa. In October 2013, 2 fighters from the Sultan Pasha al-Atrash Battalion were captured by the "Sharia Commission in Daraa" and sentenced to death. Some time in late 2013, 1st Lt. Fadlallah Zinedine was captured and detained for several hours by al-Qaeda's al-Nusra Front in Daraa.

In January 2014, the Sultan Pasha al-Atrash Battalion announced that it would suspend all of its operations in Syria and leave for Jordan. It cited the lack of support for the Suwayda Military Council and other Druze rebel groups from the Supreme Military Council, the "conspiracy of radical Islamists" and "hostilities" toward the people of Suwayda in general.

== See also ==
- Sectarianism and minorities in the Syrian Civil War
- National Unity Brigades
- Golan Regiment
- Jaysh al-Muwahhideen
