= The Opposite Direction =

Arabic Language Political debate tv show

- Arabic: الاتجاه المعاكس
- Presented by: Faisal al-Qassem
- Country of origin: Qatar
- Original language: Arabic

Production
- Production location: Qatar

Original release
- Network: Al Jazeera TV
- Release: 17 December 1996

The Opposite Direction (Arabic: الاتجاه المعاكس, romanized: Al-Etjah Al-Mo'akis) is a Qatari political debate TV show by Al Jazeera hosted by TV presenter Faisal al-Qassem. It streams weekly and addresses current events in the Middle East and the Arab world.

The first episode was released in 1996, and today the show is still active. The TV show is hosted by Al Jazeera's TV presenter Faisal al-Qassem. Two guests representing opinions of each side of a given topic being debated are invited to participate in the show.

The show has been called Al Jazeera's "most polemical" program.

In 2001, Al-Qassem was quoted as saying the following about the show's intensions:

"Dialogue is something missing among the Arabs. It is missing in schools, as much as it is missing everywhere else in life of the Arabs. . . . Through programmes such as mine, we hope to implement new rules, those that educate the Arab human being to listen, not only to his own opinion, but to that of the other side as well. The debate-based media must enter in force and strongly in the political life of the Arabs, whether the Arab regimes like it or not."

== List of episodes ==
=== 1996 ===
- The 17th Summit of the Gulf Cooperation Council (Arabic: القمة السابعة عشر لمجلس التعاون الخليجي).

=== 1999 ===
- 09/11/1999 - The secret relationship between Mauritania and Israel (Arabic: العلاقة السرية بين موريتانيا وإسرائيل).

=== 2022 ===
- 2022/1/18 - Arab regimes and people's revolutions.. who won? (Arabic: الأنظمة العربية وثورات الشعوب.. من انتصر؟)

== See also ==
- Faisal al-Qassem
- Bela Hodod
- This is Only the Tip of the Iceberg
