= Kata'ib Humat al-Diyar =

Militant organization in Syria

- كتائب حماة الديار
- Leader: Nazih Jarbou
- Founded: 2012
- Dates active: 2012-2024
- Country: Ba'athist Syria
- Allegiance: Ba'athist Syria
- Headquarters: Suwayda
- Active regions: Suwayda Governorate
- Ideology: Assadism
- Size: 2000
- Wars: Syrian civil war; Daraa and As-Suwayda offensive (June 2015); Quneitra offensive (September 2016)

Kata'ib Humat al-Diyar (Arabic: كتائب حماة الديار) is a Syrian Druze militant organization in Suwayda Governorate.

== History ==
The group was founded in 2012 and is led by Nazih Jarbou, who is related to Youssef Jarbou, one of three Druze Sheikhs al-Aql in Syria. The group has a loyal stance with Ba'athist Syria. In addition, the group participated "in other forms of local outreach, such as hosting local sheikhs for meetings" and has the full support of the sheikh of the Druze Unitary Community, Youssef Jarbou, and is directly affiliated with the sheikh.

The group displaced Bedouin tribes along with other pro-Assad factions due to sectarian tensions.

The faction fought against the Islamic State of Iraq and Syria in May 2015, near Al Ḩaqf with the support of the Men of Dignity. During the 2015 Daraa and As-Suwayda offensive, the group had support and funding from Ba'athist Syria and Druze groups in Lebanon. The following year, it collaborated with other pro-Assad factions in the 2016 Quneitra offensive.

The group manned checkpoints in Suwayda Governorate.

The group was empowered in 2019 by the General Intelligence Directorate to negotiate with a gang of kidnappers from Al-Ariqah; the decision was criticized by "activists and residents".

The following year, the group fought against the Eighth Brigade in September 2020 alongside various Druze groups, including the Sheikh al-Karama Forces and the Al-Fahd Forces, in addition to the National Defence Forces.
