= Slaim, Suwayda =

Slaim سليم
- Village
- Location within Syria
- Coordinates: 32°47′34″N 36°34′42″E
- Grid position: 297/245
- Country: Syria
- Governorate: Suwayda
- District: Suwayda
- Subdistrict: Suwayda

Population (2004 census)
  - Total: 2,129
- Time zone: UTC+2 (EET)
  - Summer (DST): UTC+3 (EEST)

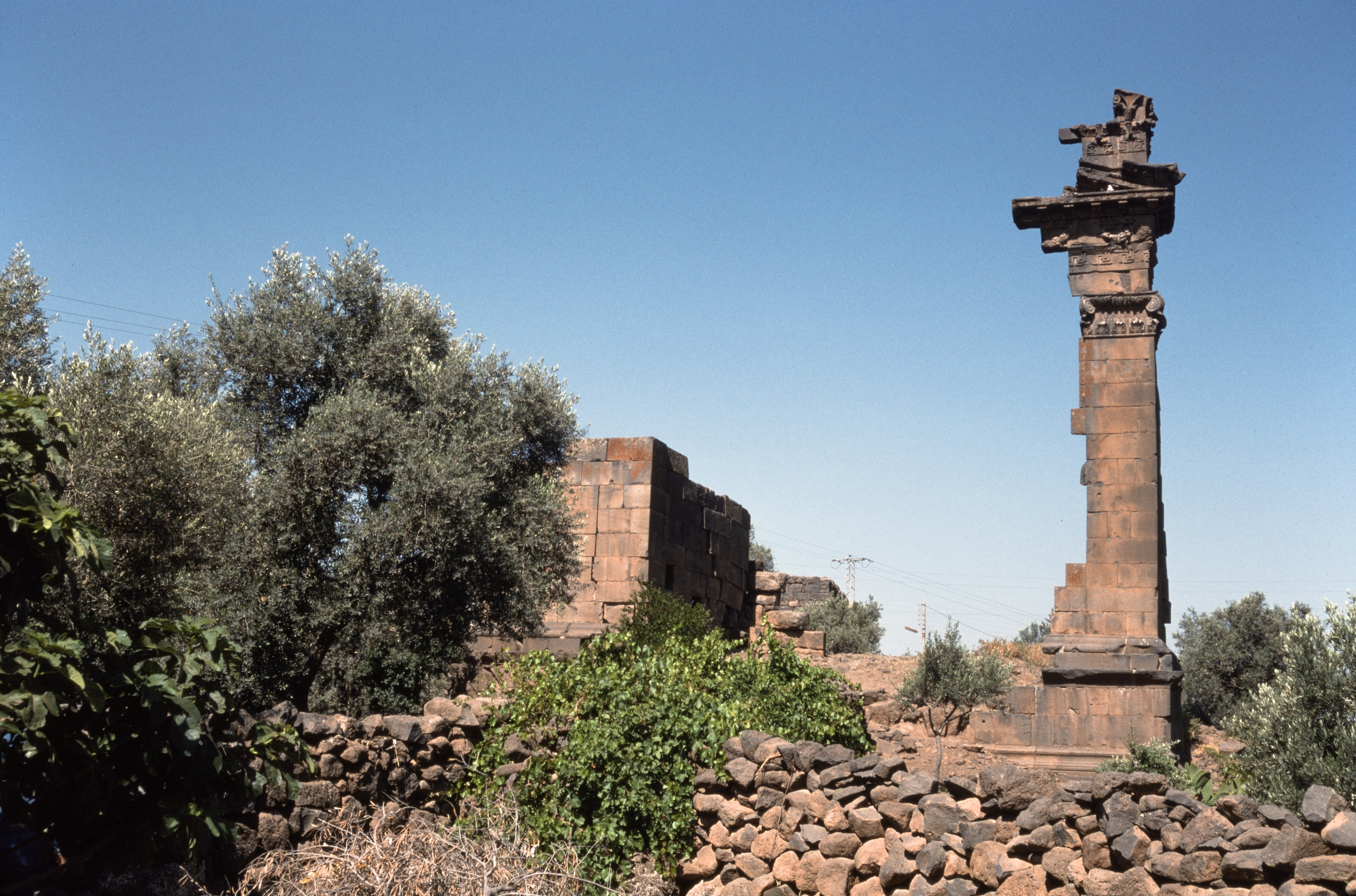
Remains of east facade of the Roman temple

Slaim (Arabic: سليم also spelled Slaym, Slim, Slem, MSA: Sulaym, sometimes incorrectly referred to as Salim) is a village in southern Syria, administratively part of the Suwayda Governorate, located north of Suwayda. Nearby localities include Attil to the west, Murdok and Shahba to the north and Qanawat to the southeast. According to the Syria Central Bureau of Statistics (CBS), Slaim had a population of 2,129 in the 2004 census. Its inhabitants are predominantly Druze, with a Sunni Muslim Bedouin minority.

== History ==
Inhabited in the Roman period, its ancient name was Selaema in Latin. In 1596 it appeared as Salam in the Ottoman tax registers, part of the nahiya (subdistrict) of Bani Nasiyya of the Hauran Sanjak. It had a population of 17 Muslim households. Among the inhabitants were a group of settled Bedouin. The villagers paid a fixed tax rate of 20% on wheat, barley, summer crops, goats and/or beehives, in addition to "occasional revenues"; a total of 4,800 akçe.

Slaim was resettled by Druze in the 18th century. It was often used, according to explorer Johann Ludwig Burckhardt, by the local inhabitants to evade conscription or taxation by the Ottoman authorities. The Druze Banu Abu Assaf family historically inhabited and dominated the village.

In 1838 Eli Smith noted Slaim as being located in Jebel Hauran, and inhabited by Druze and Christians.

== Archaeology ==
Slaim contains the ruins of a 2nd-century Roman temple. It was first surveyed in 1819 W. J. Bankes, then again in the early 20th century by Howard Crosby Butler and finally between 1980 and 1988 K. S. Freyberger. The temple has "a unique plan and its architectural decoration is quite rich", according to historian Ted Kaizer. It consists of a pronaos, a naos and an adyton. The building has a rectangular layout and was built on 2.4 meter high pavilion.

== Religious buildings ==
- Maqam Abu Rafi' (Druze Shrine)

== See also ==
- Druze in Syria

== Bibliography ==
- Batatu, H. (1999). Syria's Peasantry, the Descendants of Its Lesser Rural Notables, and Their Politics. Princeton University Press. ISBN 0691002541.
- Firro, Kais (1992). A History of the Druzes, Volume 1. BRILL. ISBN 9789004094376.
- Hütteroth, W.-D.; Abdulfattah, K. (1977). Historical Geography of Palestine, Transjordan and Southern Syria in the Late 16th Century. Erlanger Geographische Arbeiten, Sonderband 5. Erlangen, Germany: Vorstand der Fränkischen Geographischen Gesellschaft. ISBN 3-920405-41-2.
- Kaizer, Ted (2008). The Variety of Local Religious Life in the Near East In the Hellenistic and Roman Periods. BRILL. ISBN 9789004167353.
- Robinson, E.; Smith, E. (1841). Biblical Researches in Palestine, Mount Sinai and Arabia Petraea: A Journal of Travels in the year 1838. Vol. 3. Boston: Crocker & Brewster.
