= Popular Committees (Syria) =

Pro Syrian Baath Party militia

People's Popular Committees Lijan militias اللجان الشعبية al-Lijan al-Sha'biyah
- اللجان الشعبية
- Flag of Ba'athist Syria
- Dates active: 2012
- Merged into: NDF
- Active regions: Syria
- Ideology: Neo-Ba'athism; Assadism
- Size: 2,000–5,000
- Wars: Syrian Civil War; Rif Dimashq offensive (August–October 2012); Battle of Dama; Daraa and As-Suwayda offensive (June 2015); Battle of Aleppo (2012–2016); Al-Qusayr offensive; Battle of Maaloula

The Popular Committees (also called Lijan militias; Arabic: اللجان الشعبية al-Lijan al-Sha'biyah, meaning "people's committees") were militias that emerged in Syria during the Syrian Civil War. They originated as neighborhood vigilante groups in the Christian, Druze and Alawi and Shia Muslim quarters of Damascus and elsewhere to prevent the infiltration of Sunni-dominated rebel groups. However, the Popular Committees included a significant number of pro-regime Sunni Muslims as well.

The Popular Committees were armed by the Syrian government and manned checkpoints around their districts. They have been accused of carrying out extrajudicial executions and revenge killings. Reuters quoted a Druze resident of Jaramana: "[The government] say the Lijans help us protect ourselves, but really they just wanted to light the sectarian fuse in Damascus". StrategyPage claimed that the Syrian Army offered weapons to minority communities in contested cities: "if the minorities will form self-defense militias and keep rebels out, the Army will not fire artillery at those neighborhoods". Tony Badran of Now Lebanon commented: "Assad seeks to assemble the minorities around him in order to present himself as the sole and unavoidable interlocutor on behalf of these segments of Syrian society, where he has cultivated loyal patches". Iran has assisted in setting up and training Shia militias in Syria.

In Aleppo, some residents claimed that the Syrian Army organized a Christian militia during fighting there in August 2012. In the Jdeideh quarter, the Christian militia was allegedly the first to fight against rebels. The day after a bombing killed four government officials, including the Greek Orthodox Christian Syrian Minister of Defence, General Dawoud Rajiha, it was reported by residents that at least 200 AK-47s were handed out in a Christian neighborhood of Damascus.

From around mid-2012, hundreds of Popular Committees and other irregular paramilitary groups were merged into what became the National Defence Forces, bringing more organisation to the groups and subordinating them within the Syrian security structures.

== Legacy ==
After the fall of the Assad regime in late 2024, the Syrian transitional government began prosecute individuals who had committed crimes during the Syrian civil war. Ahmed Taama (alias "Abu Wassim al-Ruz"), "a prominent figure in the Popular Committees", was arrested over "criminal acts against civilians" in several Syrian Palestinian refugee camps in January 2025.

== See also ==
- List of armed groups in the Syrian Civil War
