= Syrian Brigade Party =

- Leader: Malik Abu Khair
- Founded: 7 July 2021

The Syrian Brigade Party is a Syrian political party.

== History ==
It was reportedly formed by foreign members who were opposed to the Assad regime.

The group's military wing, the Anti-Terrorism Force, was also established. Its mission was to "control chaos and protect Suwayda." The group was dismantled in June 2022, following an attack on the group by the National Defence Forces, Hezbollah, the Syrian Arab Army, as well as Druze and Bedouin fighters.

The military wing was re-established around July 2025 and became part of the National Guard the following month.

== Organization ==
The party includes different political offices, including party branches, an office for "civil affairs", a "women's office", civil defense and an armed branch known as the Anti-Terrorism Force.

== Policies ==
In an interview with Syria Direct, the head of the party, Malik Abu Khair, confirmed that the party was in favor of federalism.
