= Laith al-Balous =

Syrian politician and former commander

Laith Wahid al-Balous
- ليث وحيد البلعوس

Member of the People's Assembly
- Incumbent
- Assumed office 1 July 2026
- Appointed by: Ahmed al-Sharaa

Personal details
- Born: Laith Wahid al-Balous; 1996 or 1997 (age 29–30) Suwayda Governorate, Syria
- Citizenship: Syria

Military service
- Allegiance: Syrian transitional government (2024–)
- Battles/wars: Syrian civil war; Aftermath of the Syrian civil war; Southern Syria clashes (July 2025–present)

Laith Wahid al-Balous (born 1996 or 1997) is a Syrian politician and former militia commander who is currently serving as a member of the People's Assembly since 2026, having being appointed by Syrian president Ahmed al-Sharaa.

== Involvement in the Syrian civil war ==
He and his brother, Fahd al-Balous, were initially part of the Druze militia Men of Dignity headed by their father, Wahid al-Balous, though they were forced out following his assassination in 2015. The two brothers formed the Sheikh al-Karama Forces, and Laith briefly affiliated with the Anti-Terrorism Force, though he heads the Guest House of Dignity, which was formerly the "operations and administrative center" for the Men of Dignity. Laith was sharply critical of the leadership of the Men of Dignity.

He and Fahd were injured in the 2015 assassination of his father, in addition to his uncle, Raf'at. Laith has shrapnel from the bomb blast in his shoulder.

Al-Balous met with a Russian delegation in August 2022 and called for the ending of conscription of young men in the area, opposing Iranian troops in the governorate and "armed groups" that were affiliated with it or the militant group Hezbollah.

Laith survived multiple assassination attempts on his own life. One attempt took place on 13 May 2023 in Al-Mazraa, where he was shot in the left thigh after being targeted by gunmen who were on a motorcycle while another happened on 1 May 2025 in Shahba.

=== Post-Ba'athist Syria ===
He has pursued close ties with the Ahmed al-Sharaa administration and emphasized his support for a ceasefire in Suwayda, along with the "return of Syrian state institutions" and "continued efforts to control the security situation" in an August interview with the Syrian Arab News Agency.

He is perceived to have an overstated influence on Druze affairs and "has no ... grassroots authority" in the governorate, according to Hadeel Oueis of the Jamestown Foundation.

He was appointed as a member of the People's Assembly by Syrian president Ahmed al-Sharaa on 1 July 2026.
