= Al-Ajailat =

Al-Ajailat العجيلات Al-Ojailat, Al-Ujailat
- Village
- Location within Syria
- Coordinates: 32°45′50″N 36°46′50″E
- Country: Syria
- Governorate: Suwayda
- District: Suwayda
- Subdistrict: Mushannaf

Population (2004 census)
  - Total: 790
- Time zone: UTC+2 (EET)
  - Summer (DST): UTC+3 (EEST)

Al-Ajailat (Arabic: العجيلات) is a village situated in the Suwayda District of Suwayda Governorate, in southern Syria. According to the Syria Central Bureau of Statistics (CBS), Al-Ajailat had a population of 790 in the 2004 census. Its inhabitants are predominantly Druze.

== See also ==
- Druze in Syria
