= Al-Thaalah =

Village in Syria

Al-Thaalah الثعلة Al-Tha'lah, Al-Thaala, Ath-Thaalah
- Village
- Location in Syria
- Coordinates: 32°42′42″N 36°26′57″E
- Grid position: 285/235 PAL
- Country: Syria
- Governorate: Suwayda
- District: Suwayda
- Subdistrict: Suwayda

Population (2004 census)
  - Total: 4,569
- City Qrya Pcode: C6140

Al-Thaalah (Arabic: الثعلة, also spelled Al-Tha'lah or Ath-Thaalah), is a Syrian village located in the Suwayda District of the Suwayda Governorate. According to the Syria Central Bureau of Statistics (CBS), Al-Thaalah had a population of 4,569 in the 2004 census. Its inhabitants are predominantly Druze.

== History ==
In 1596, Al-Thaalah appeared in the Ottoman tax registers as Ta'la; part of the nahiya of Bani Nasiyya in the Hauran Sanjak. It had an entirely Muslim population consisting of 30 households and 12 bachelors. The villagers paid a fixed tax rate of 25% on various agricultural products, including wheat (10500 akçe), barley (2250), summer crops (1500), goats and beehives (500), in addition to "occasional revenues"(250); a total of 15,000 akçe.

In 1838, it was noted as a Sunni Muslim village, situated "the Nukra, east of Al-Shaykh Maskin". By the end of the nineteenth century, its population had become predominantly Druze.

During the Bedouin–Druze clashes in 2025, Al-Thaalah remained under caretaker government control as one of 34 western villages held by Damascus forces and Bedouin allies.

== Religious buildings ==
- Maqam al-Khidr (Druze Shrine)
- Maqam Abel (Druze Shrine)

== Notable people ==
- Faisal al-Qassem, TV host

== See also ==
- Druze in Syria

== Bibliography ==
- Hütteroth, W.-D.; Abdulfattah, K. (1977). Historical Geography of Palestine, Transjordan and Southern Syria in the Late 16th Century. Erlanger Geographische Arbeiten, Sonderband 5. Erlangen, Germany: Vorstand der Fränkischen Geographischen Gesellschaft. ISBN 3-920405-41-2.
- Robinson, E.; Smith, E. (1841). Biblical Researches in Palestine, Mount Sinai and Arabia Petraea: A Journal of Travels in the year 1838. Vol. 3. Boston: Crocker & Brewster.
