= Jaysh al-Muwahhidin =

Druze militia in the Syrian civil war

- Jaysh al-Muwahhidin logo Druze flag used by Jaysh al-Muwahhidin
- Leader: Ibrahim al-Tamimi
- Dates active: 2013–2025
- Merged into: National Guard
- Active regions: Aleppo Governorate, As-Suwayda Governorate, Deraa Governorate, Damascus Governorate
- Ideology: Syrian Druze interests
- Wars: Syrian civil war; Battle of Dama; Daraa and As-Suwayda offensive (June 2015); Syrian conflict (2024–present); Druze insurgency in Southern Syria (2025–present); Southern Syria clashes (July 2025–present)

The Jaysh al-Muwahhidin (Arabic: جيش الموحدين, romanized: Jaysh al-Muwaḥḥidīn, lit. 'Army of Monotheists') was a Druze militia in the Syrian civil war that engaged in defensive war, though were also described as supporters of Bashar al-Assad and the Ba'athist Syrian government.

The group mainly operated in the Suwayda, Deraa, Damascus and other regions where the Druze are concentrated and announced their formation in the beginning of 2013. It operated largely in the Mount Druze, also known as Jabal al-Arab, a mountainous area of as-Suwayda Governorate as well as the Mount Hermon area in Damascus Governorate, areas primarily inhabited by Druze. The group was set up in response to attacks on Druze civilians. The group commemorates anticolonial figures such as Sultan al-Atrash, who was a prominent Druze chieftain. The group joined the National Guard in August 2025.
