= Attil, Suwayda =

Attil عتيل Atil, Ateel, ʻAtil
- Village
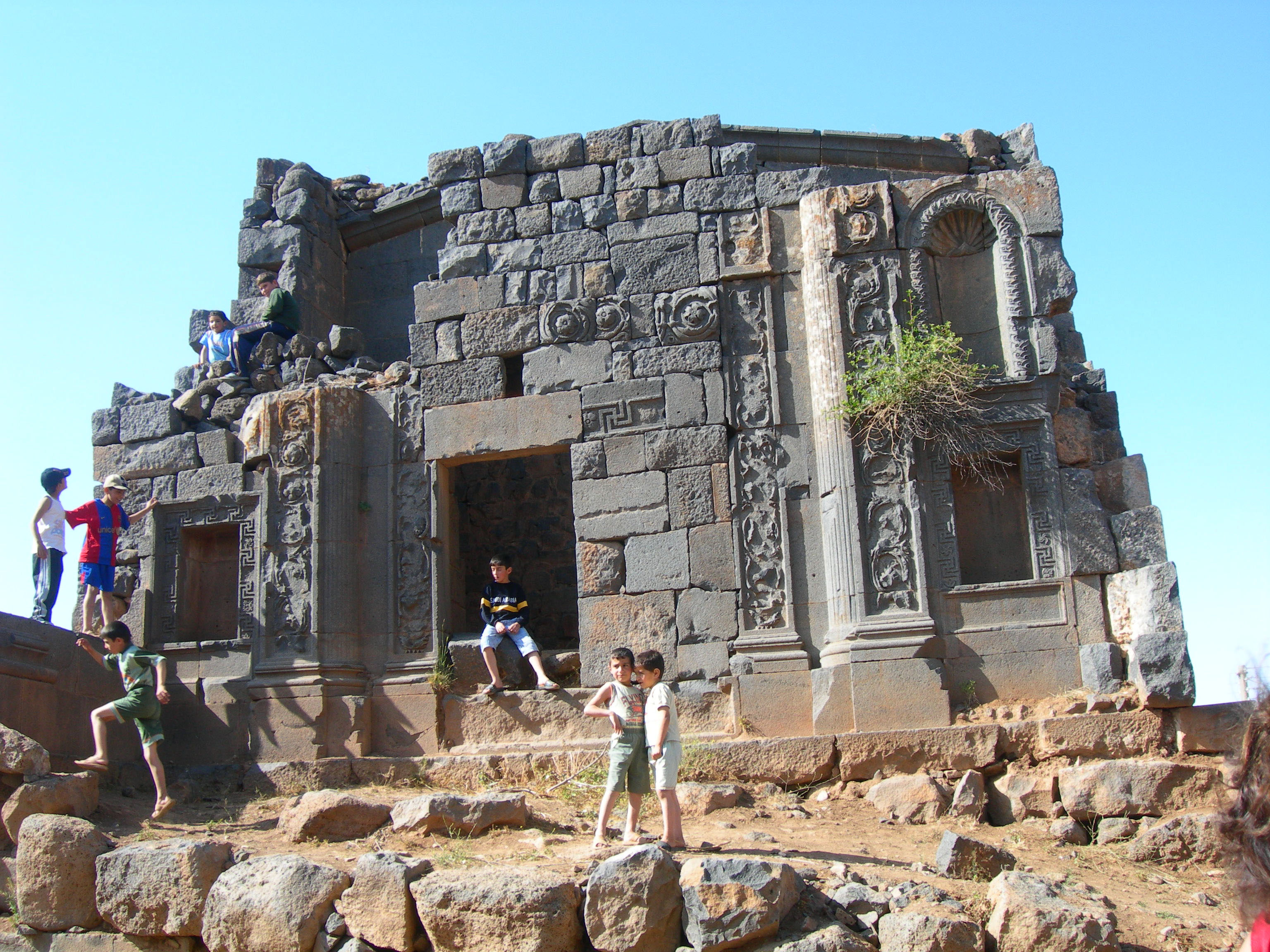
- Roman temple

- Location within Syria
- Coordinates: 32°45′26″N 36°34′36″E
- Grid position: 298/241
- Country: Syria
- Governorate: Suwayda
- District: Suwayda
- Subdistrict: Suwayda

Population (2004 census)
  - Total: 4,193
- Time zone: UTC+2 (EET)
  - Summer (DST): UTC+3 (EEST)

Attil (Arabic: عتيل, also spelled Atil, Atīl) is a village in southern Syria, administratively part of the al-Suwayda District of the al-Suwayda Governorate. In the 2004 census, it had a population of 4,193. Its inhabitants are predominantly Druze, with a Sunni Muslim Bedouin minority.

== History ==
In 1596 it appeared as Atil in the Ottoman tax registers, part of the nahiya (subdistrict) of Bani Nasiyya of the Hauran Sanjak. It had a population of 25 households, and 5 bachelors; all Muslim. The villagers paid a fixed tax rate of 20% on various agricultural products, such as wheat (3750 a.), barley (1350 a.), summer crops (2500 a.), goats and/or beehives (160 a.), in addition to "occasional revenues" (150 a.); a total of 7,910 akçe. A quarter of the revenue went to a waqf.

In 1838 Eli Smith noted 'Atil as being located in Jebel Hauran, and inhabited by Druze.

== Archaeology ==
Atill has been identified with ancient Atheila and contains two nearly identical Roman-period temples that have been surveyed by multiple scholars since the 19th century. The southern temple, preserved with much of its architectural decoration, stands on a podium containing a vaulted crypt and features a Corinthian order façade with elaborate carved details. An inscription found on the temple dates the construction of elements of its superstructure to 151 AD, during the reign of Roman emperor Antoninus Pius, though analysis of the architecture suggests that parts of the structure may belong to an earlier phase.

Another inscription from Atil, dated to 211 AD, mentions the Greco-Syrian deity Theandrios and was reported in the 19th century by William Waddington as having been found in a modern house. A further inscription is dedicated to Zeus O[...], probably referring to Zeus Olympios.

The village is recorded as Athēlēnōn (Αθεληνων) in the Diocletianic boundary stones corpus, dated to c. 300 CE.

== Religious buildings ==
- Maqam Al-Sheikh Gharib (Druze Shrine)

== See also ==
- Druze in Syria

== Bibliography ==
- Hütteroth, W.-D.; Abdulfattah, K. (1977). Historical Geography of Palestine, Transjordan and Southern Syria in the Late 16th Century. Erlanger Geographische Arbeiten, Sonderband 5. Erlangen, Germany: Vorstand der Fränkischen Geographischen Gesellschaft. ISBN 3-920405-41-2.
- Robinson, E.; Smith, E. (1841). Biblical Researches in Palestine, Mount Sinai and Arabia Petraea: A Journal of Travels in the year 1838. Vol. 3. Boston: Crocker & Brewster.
