= Dama, Suwayda =

Dama داما
- Village
- Location in Syria
- Coordinates: 32°57′10″N 36°25′51″E
- Grid position: 283/262
- Country: Syria
- Governorate: Suwayda
- District: Shahba
- Subdistrict: Ariqah

Population (2004 census)
  - Total: 1,799
- Time zone: UTC+2 (EET)
  - Summer (DST): UTC+3 (EEST)

Dama (Arabic: داما) is a village in the Suwayda Governorate of southwest Syria. It is located in the heart of the Lajat lava plateau, 29 km north west of the city of Suwayda. According to the Syria Central Bureau of Statistics (CBS), Dama had a population of 1,799 in the 2004 census. Its inhabitants are predominantly Druze.

== History ==
Dama and neighboring villages are thought to be the place where Saint Paul took refuge after escaping from Damascus.

The village, like most of the villages in Jabal ad-Druze, was an old Roman location. Many of its houses are still in their original condition. The inhabitants are mostly Druze and their main occupation is agriculture.

=== Ottoman era ===
In 1596 Dama appeared in the Ottoman tax registers as part of the nahiya of Bani Abdullah, in the Hauran Sanjak. It had an entirely Muslim population consisting of 74 households and 28 bachelors. The villagers paid a fixed tax rate of 40% on various agricultural products, including wheat, barley, summer crops, goats and/or beehives; a total of 12,000 akçe.

In 1838, Dama was noted as a ruin, situated "in the Lejah itself", but also noted as "central point, which is considered the capital of Lejah". By the mid-19th century, there were a small number of Christian families living in the village itself, while the surrounding land was inhabited by nomadic Sulut Arab tribesmen. The Druze began to settle in Dama in the 1860s, and by 1884 the village was home to 40 Druze families and 12 Catholic ones. The Christian population left the village towards the end of the 19th century, causing it to become a wholly Druze settlement.

=== Modern era ===
Dama played a major role in the late stages of the Great Syrian Revolution (1925–1927). It hosted the important Dama Convention which resulted in the refusal of French proposals and the collapse of negotiations between the Druze rebels and the French. It was also the site of some of the last battles in the revolution fought by guerrilla groups led by Emir Adel Arslan.

The city participated in the Battle of Dama, between Druze militias and the Al-Nusra Front.

== See also ==
- Druze in Syria

== Bibliography ==
- Hütteroth, W.-D.; Abdulfattah, K. (1977). Historical Geography of Palestine, Transjordan and Southern Syria in the Late 16th Century. Erlanger Geographische Arbeiten, Sonderband 5. Erlangen, Germany: Vorstand der Fränkischen Geographischen Gesellschaft. ISBN 3-920405-41-2.
- Robinson, E.; Smith, E. (1841). Biblical Researches in Palestine, Mount Sinai and Arabia Petraea: A Journal of Travels in the year 1838. Vol. 3. Boston: Crocker & Brewster.
