= Salkhad District =

Salkhad District منطقة صلخد
- District
- Map of Salkhad District within Suwayda Governorate
- Coordinates (Salkhad): 32.4917°N 36.7111°E
- Country: Syria
- Governorate: Suwayda
- Seat: Salkhad
- Subdistricts: 5 nawāḥī

Area
  - Total: 1,779.92 km^{2} (687.23 sq mi)

Population (2004)
  - Total: 60,375
  - Density: 33.920/km^{2} (87.853/sq mi)
- Geocode: SY1302

Salkhad District (Arabic: منطقة صلخد, romanized: manṭiqat Ṣalḫad) is a district of the Suwayda Governorate in southern Syria. Administrative centre is the city of Salkhad. At the 2004 census, the district had a population of 60,375.

== Sub-districts ==
The district of Salkhad is divided into five sub-districts or nawāḥī (population as of 2004):

Subdistricts of Salkhad District
Code	Name	Area	Population
SY130200	Salkhad Subdistrict	km^{2}	24,045
SY130201	al-Qurayya Subdistrict	130.56 km^{2}	9,892
SY130202	al-Ghariyah Subdistrict	86.48 km^{2}	5,923
SY130203	Dhibin Subdistrict	144.65 km^{2}	6,900
SY130204	Malah Subdistrict	972.25 km^{2}	13,615

== See also ==
- List of populated places in Suwayda Governorate
