= Shahba District =

Shahba District منطقة شهبا
- District
- Map of Shahba' District within Suwayda Governorate
- Coordinates (Shahba): 32.8542°N 36.6292°E
- Country: Syria
- Governorate: Suwayda
- Seat: Shahba
- Subdistricts: 4 nawāḥī

Area
  - Total: 1,773.13 km^{2} (684.61 sq mi)

Population (2004)
  - Total: 72,264
  - Density: 40.755/km^{2} (105.56/sq mi)
- Geocode: SY1303

Shahba District (Arabic: منطقة شهبا, romanized: manṭiqat Šahbā) is a district of the Suwayda Governorate in southern Syria. The administrative centre is the city of Shahba. At the 2004 census, the district had a population of 72,264.

== Sub-districts ==
The district of Shahba is divided into four sub-districts or nawāḥī (population as of 2004):

Subdistricts of Shahba District
Code	Name	Area	Population
SY130300	Shahba Subdistrict	263.88 km^{2}	31,657
SY130301	Shaqqa Subdistrict	731.29 km^{2}	15,849
SY130302	al-Ariqah Subdistrict	204.20 km^{2}	11,723
SY130303	as-Sawra as-Saghira Subdistrict	573.76 km^{2}	13,035

== See also ==
- List of populated places in Suwayda Governorate
