= Haj Fadel Government =

- حكومة الحاج فاضل
- Haj Fadel Al-Aboud

Overview
- Established: 6 November 1918
- Dissolved: 25 December 1918
- Country: Syria, Ottoman Empire Ottoman Empire.
- Leader: Haj Fadel Al-Aboud
- Appointed by: Tribal Coalition
- Headquarters: Deir al-Zour.

The Haj Fadel Government (Arabic: حكومة الحاج فاضل) was a local government established during the Occupation of Zor region in eastern Syria. It was based in Deir ez-Zor following the Ottoman withdrawal in 1918 and was led by Haj Fadel Al-Aboud, after whom it was named.

== Haj Fadel Aboud ==
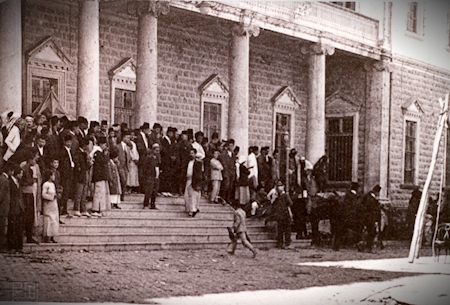
The Syrian National Congress in 1919.

Fadel Aboud Hassan was born in Deir al-Zour in 1872. His leadership qualities were evident from an early age, and he proved to be an effective leader despite having no formal education. He also held a prominent social standing in Deir al-Zour, a position he inherited from his father, Aboud Hassan, which helped him assume leadership roles. Haj Fadel worked in trade and maintained extensive commercial relationships with Turkish and Aleppine merchants, as well as with his relatives from the Najjar and Tayfur families in the city of Hama.

Haj Fadel Al-Aboud was arrested multiple times for his support of national causes and revolutionary movements. He was sentenced to exile in the city of Jisr al-Shughour after being accused of organizing a popular uprising against French colonial rule, in protest of the French military campaign targeting the Bukhabur tribes that refused to pay taxes to the colonizers. He was also charged with insulting Khalil Isaac, the Wali of Deir al-Zour, who was collaborating with the French authorities.

He protested the decision issued by the French High Commissioner Maurice Paul Sarrail, No. 49 S/5 in August 1925, which ordered the exile of his cousin Ayyash Al-Haj and all his family members to the city of Jableh due to their resistance against French colonial rule. His opposition to this decision subjected him to security harassment and repeated arrests by the French military authorities.

Haj Fadel Al-Aboud represented the Euphrates region at the Syrian National Congress held in late June 1919, which on 8 March 1920 declared the independence of Syria, the establishment of the Kingdom of Syria, and the inauguration of Faisal bin Sharif Hussein as king. He also took part in the ceremony marking Faisal’s inauguration as King of Iraq on 23 August 1921 and expressed his full support for his ascension.

Haj Fadel Al-Aboud passed away in 1936 in the city of Deir al-Zour, where he was laid to rest.

== Formation of the First Government ==
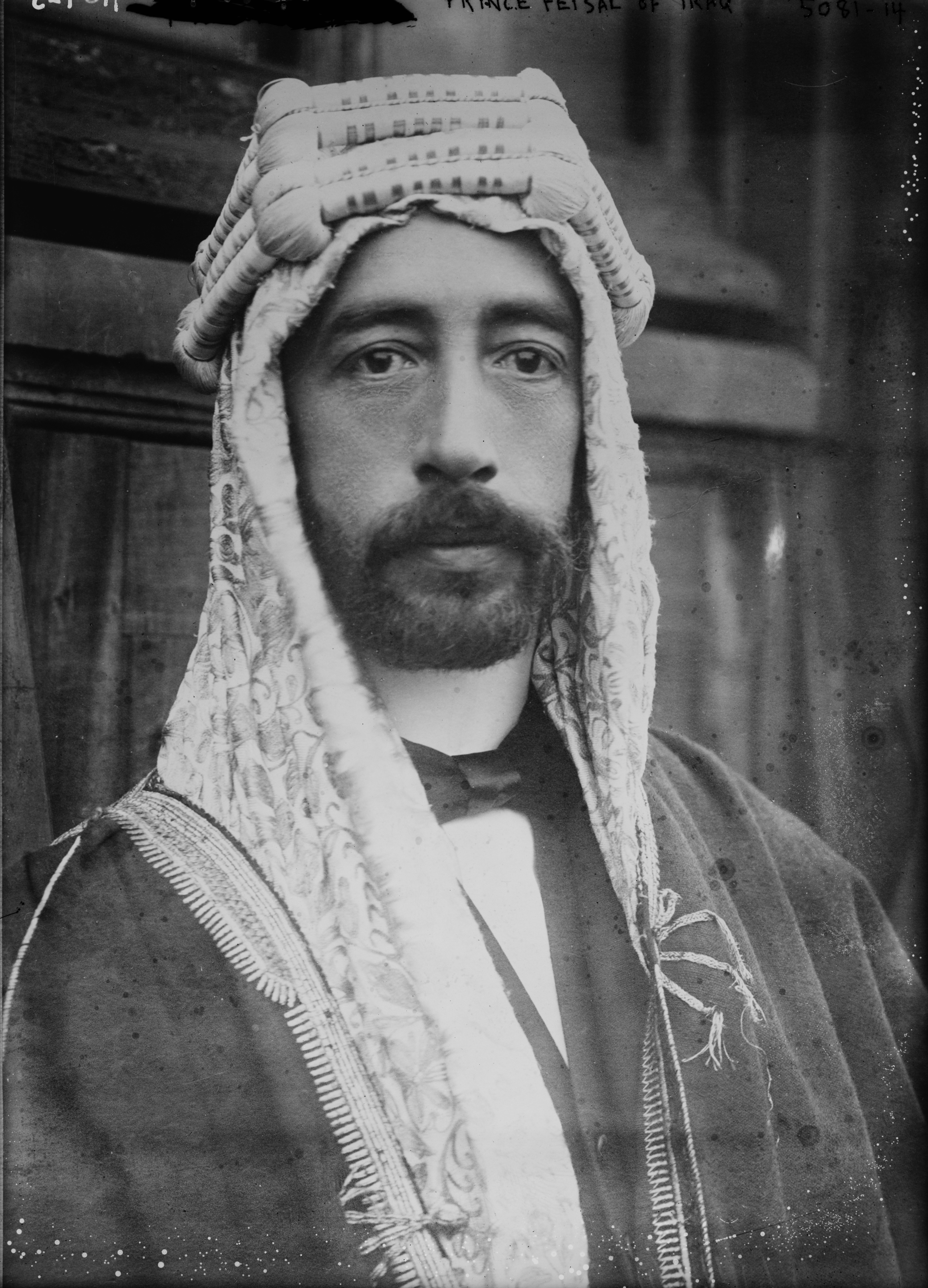
King Faisal in 1920.

After the Ottomans withdrew from Deir al-Zour on 6 November 1918, chaos erupted throughout the city, with widespread looting and theft. The situation made it essential to establish a strong authority to protect the city and its residents. As mayor, Al-Hassan took the initiative to form the first local government and called upon tribal leaders from surrounding villages and districts to support him and pledge their allegiance. One of the government’s main priorities was to restore security and manage the city’s affairs. This local government later became known as the “Government of Haj Fadel.”

The government remained in place until the arrival of Sharif Nasser, the cousin of Prince Faisal Bin Al-Hussein, on 1 December 1918, followed by Mari Basha Al-Mallah on 7 December 1918.

== Formation of the Second Government ==
After the Battle of Maysalun on 24 July 1920 and the subsequent occupation of Damascus by French forces, Deir Ezzor fell into a state of turmoil and insecurity. This situation prompted Al-Hassan to form his second government, which, despite its limited resources, provided vital services in protecting the city and ensuring the safety of its residents.

This government remained active until 23 November 1920, when it was dissolved by order of the French occupation authorities.

== Achievements of the Haj Fadel Government ==
The most notable achievements of the First and Second Haj Fadel Governments included:

- Protecting lives, honor, and property, and establishing security throughout the region. Remarkably, no cases of murder or theft were reported during this period, despite the government’s short tenure.
- Preventing acts of revenge or the settling of personal disputes following the withdrawal of both Ottoman and later Arab forces.
- Ensuring the continued payment of salaries to government employees.
- Maintaining public services across the city.

== Armenian Genocide ==
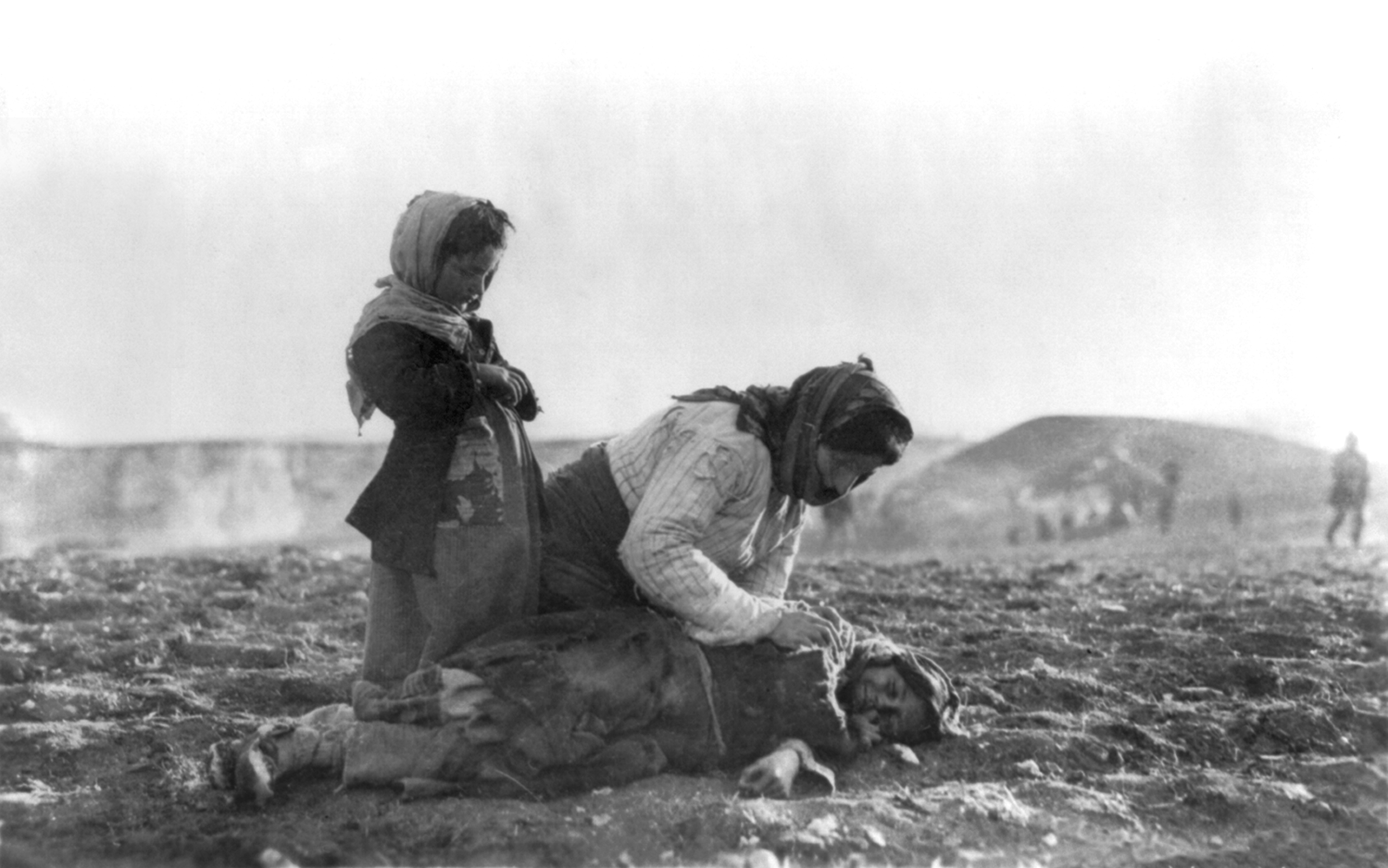
Armenian genocide

When the Ottoman authorities persecuted the Armenian people, they forced them to march toward the Syrian city of Deir al-Zour and its surrounding desert without providing the basic facilities or supplies needed to sustain the lives of the hundreds of thousands of Armenians deported during and after their forced journey into the Syrian Desert.

Al-Hassan, who was the mayor of Deir al-Zour, offered the Armenian deportees food, shelter, security, and means of livelihood. The Armenians later repaid this kindness when the French authorities sentenced him to death in Aleppo; they supported and defended him, which ultimately led the French to revoke the death sentence and instead exile him to Jisr al-Shughur.

== See also ==
- Fadel Al-Aboud
- Ayyash Al-Haj
- The epic of Ain Albu Gomaa
- Syria
- Deir al-Zour
- Deir ez-Zor suspension bridge
- Deir ez-Zor Camps
- Al-Baggara
- Syrian National Congress
