= Al-Baggara =

Arab tribe in Syria, Jordan, Iraq, and Lebanon

Bakara البقّارة
- Adnan
- Ethnicity: Arab
- Nisba: al-Baqqarah
- Location: Syria; Iraq; Lebanon; Jordan
- Parent tribe: Banu Hashim
- Population: 1,200,000
- Language: Arabic
- Religion: Sunni Islam
- Surnames: al-Aboud - al-Haj

Al-Baggara or Bakara (Arabic: البقّارة (البكّارة), al-Baqqārah or al-Bakkārah) is an Arab tribe of the Euphrates tribes spread widely between Syria, Jordan, Iraq and Lebanon. The tribe was named by the name of their ancestor, Imam Muhammad al-Baqir, one of the grandsons of Ali ibn Abi Talib.

Baggara tribespeople in Syria mainly live west of Deir al-Zour city, ranging from the northern banks of the Euphrates to the Raqqa provincial border, in villages from Al-Husseiniyah to Mahamidah, where the Baggara's chiefdom family lives, to al-Kasrat, al-Kubar/Jazrat al-Boshams, and Jazra Al-Milaj, spanning a distance of some 80 km.

East of Deir al-Zour, the Baggara live in smaller numbers in the villages of Meratt, Khusham, and Jadid Baggara; sources suggest a total of approximately 100,000 Baggara live in these areas east and west of the city. Although accurate figures are not available, a large number of people of Baggara lineage have integrated into Deir al-Zour city, some say a full one-third of the city's residents have roots in the tribe, Prominent Baggara families there are Fadel Al-Aboud, Al-Ayesh, Al-Ayyash, where they had a major role in the political leadership of the city of Deir al-Zour.

Other regions where the Baggara lives include Hasaka province, in an area known as Baggara Al-Jabal (Baggara Mountain), Raqqa the city of Aleppo and other northern towns, and Idlib. Some reports indicate that their number in Syria is around 1.2 million.

== Structure ==
The tribe encompasses the following clans, mostly in Deir al-Zour province but also in Hasaka, Raqqa, and Aleppo:

- Abu Arab clan, This clan, for which the Al-Bashir family is central, inhabits Mahamidah, the adequate capital of the Baggara tribe in Syria.
- Al-Abdulkarim clan is the largest and most influential Baggara clan and is divided into four lineages: Al-Hawara, Al-Qataa, Al-Maazat, and Al-Sayyad. Decades ago, Al-Abdulkarim clan members lived in the Deir al-Zour district known as Al-Sayyad—an etymological reference to the tribe's purported genealogical link to Muhammad Al-Baqir (the Fifth Imam), a descendant of the Prophet. Significant families in Deir al-Zour city who belong to the Al-Abdulkarim from "Alsada" family include Al-Aboud, Al-Aish, Al-Ayash, Fakoush, Al-Talaa, Hattab, Al-Harwal, and others. These families also live in Jadid Baggara, the only village in Syria with the namesake of the tribe.
- Abu Maesh clan, The Al-Talaa family holds the chief position.
- Al-Ghassem Al-Obied and Al-Hamad Al-obied clan.
- Abu Masaah clan, Chiefdom is held by the Al-Masawi family.
- Al-klizat clan, Residents of Umm Madifah and Khawirah villages.
- Al-Gharangah clan, Chief family is Batran, located in Umm Eshbah.
- Abu Hamdan clan, Chiefdom is held by the Al-Wakaa family.
- Baggara Aljabal clan.
- Abu Rahmah clan, lives in Al-Tabeh and Dahla.
- Abu Sheikh clan.
- Abu Badranclan. This clan is located in Husieniah village, including the well-known writer Abdul-Salam Ojeili (1918–2006).
- Abu Hassan clan.
- Al-Rafiey clan.
- Abu Alaw clan.
- Al-Hamad Al-Hussien clan. This clan resides in villages of Jazira Abu Hamad.
- Al-Mreikat clan.
- Abu Saleh clan. Residing in al-Kasrat, the keyfamily is Al-Abdullah.
- AL-Halaymiah clan.
- Al-Mashhour clan resides in Tal Abyad, near the Turkish border. The chief family, Balikh Al-Tahri, opposes Assad yet supported the Iraqi Baath Party formerly led by Saddam Hussein, Most clan members have backed anti-Assad activities, and most have ended up on the Turkish side of the border.
- Abu Mislim clan.
- Al-Abdulqader clan.
- Al-Khangar clan. This clan resides in the village of Meratt.
- Al-Rashied clan.
- Abu Shames clan. This clan resides in Hawayij Shinan, in eastern Raqqa, the chief family is Al-Hayawi.
- Abu Sultan clan.
- Baggra of Aleppo city.

== Economy ==
Most Baggara tribespeoples are farmers who cultivate fruit trees and vegetables. Some of them were engaged in business and became prominent businessmen in Syria. Many Baggara tribespeople work for the Syrian government, mainly in Deir al-Zour, after which they return home to their surrounding suburbs or villages, and Large numbers of Baggara also work in Lebanon and the Persian Gulf states.

== Politics ==
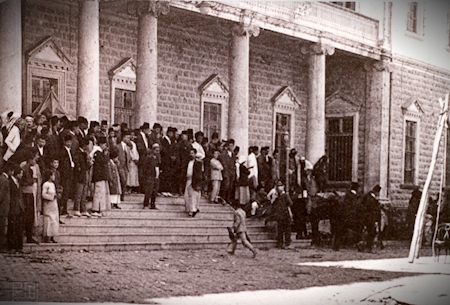
The Syrian National Congress in 1919

Baggara tribespeople who live in Deir al-Zour city has a long political history, Where some of the families of the tribe as Fadel Al-Aboud, Al-Ayesh, Al-Ayyash from the Abdulkarim clan led the city of Deir al-Zour since the Ottoman era and continued during the occupation of English and French. Some of the tribe leaders fought French and English colonialism, such as the leader Ayyash Al-Haj, who was exiled by the French authorities with his family to the city of Jableh in 1925 and executed some of his sons after being accused of preparing a revolution in Deir el-Zour to relieve pressure on the area of Jabal al-Arab during the Great Syrian Revolution in 1925.

After the formation of the Syrian state, Minister Mohamed Al-Ayesh emerged as the first minister in the Eastern Province and continued for many years and was known as a man of ministries.

In the modern era, Baggara tribespeople supported the Baath and Nasserist parties, One tribesman from the Abdulkarim clan, Yassin Al-Hafiz (1930–78), noted for his intellectualism, served as an architect of Baath party ideology. A large number of tribespeople belong to the Baath wings in both Syria and Iraq, and The Baggara tribe also includes members of the Communist Party.

Many of Baggara tribespeople joined the Baath Party primarily for benefits and government employment, but many quickly turned against the regime and joined the 2011 uprising; during this period of anti-Assad activism, Sheikh Nawaf Ragheb Al-Bashir delivered anti-regime speeches attended by tribespeople who traveled to Deir al-Zour from their nearby villages. Originally, Sheikh Nawaf joined the Party of Socialist Unitarians and called for pan-Arabism; then he supported Iran’s Shia ideology and the Shia coalition in Syria.

== Notable members ==
=== Fadel Al-Aboud ===
Fadel Al-Aboud President of Deir al-Zour government in 1918 and 1920.

Fadel Aboud Al-Hassan or Haj Fadel Al-Aboud, a Syrian leader and head of the Haj Fadel Government in eastern Syria after the Ottomans left the region in 1918.

Al-Hassan was born in Deir al-Zour in 1872 for Al-Hassan family from the Abo Obaid clan from Al-Baggara tribe.

Al-Hassan was of high social standing in Deir al-Zour, which enabled him to take over the leadership of his father, Aboud Hassan. Al-Hassan worked in trade and had extensive commercial relations with Turkish merchants and Halbians and with his cousins Najjar and Tayfur in the city of Hama.

After the withdrawal of the Ottomans on 6 November 1918, unrest broke out in the city of Deir al-Zour, leading to widespread looting and disorder. In response, a strong authority was deemed necessary to protect the city and its inhabitants. Al-Hassan, who was serving as mayor at the time, formed the city’s first local government and called on tribal leaders from surrounding villages and districts to support him and pledge their allegiance. The primary responsibilities of this government were maintaining security and administering the affairs of the city. This administration became known as the "Government of Haj Fadel".

The government continued until the arrival of Sharif Nasser, the cousin of Prince Faisal Bin Al-Hussein, on 1 December 1918, and Mari Basha Al-Mallah on 7 December 1918.

After the Battle of Maysalun on 24 July 1920 and occupation of Damascus by French forces, The city of Deir Ezzor was in a state of chaos and insecurity, which prompted Al-Hassan to form his second government, Which has done excellent services in protecting the city and maintaining the security of its people despite its limited capabilities.

This government continued its work until 23 November 1920, when it was dissolved by the French occupation authorities.

Al-Hassan represented the Euphrates region at the Syrian National Congress held in late June 1919, which proclaimed the independence of Syria and establishment of the Syrian Arab Kingdom on 8 March 1920, and appointed Faisal bin Sharif Hussein as a king. Al-Hassan participated in the coronation of Faisal as king of Iraq on 23 August 1921 and supported his inauguration.

Al-Hassan died in 1936 in Deir al-Zour and was buried there. His sons continued his political work. His son, Dr. Badri Fadel Aboud, became the Minister of Health in the government of Said Al-Ghazi in 1955, under the presidency of President Shukri al-Quwatli. He was the first Minister of Health from Deir al-Zour.

=== Ayyash Al-Haj ===
Ayyash Al-Haj

Ayyash Al-Haj Hussein Al-Jassim, a Syrian leader from Deir al-Zour city, began the armed struggle against the French colonizer in governorate of Deir al-Zour in 1925 coinciding with the outbreak of the Great Syrian Revolution in Jabal al-Arab and Ghouta of Damascus. He was sentenced by the French to exile to Jableh city with his family after they were convicted of planning and carrying out several military operations against the French forces, the latest was in "Ain Albu Gomaa". They also sentenced his eldest son Mohammed 20 years in prison on the island of Arwad, and executed his son Mahmoud by shooting with a number of other revolutionaries.

Ayyash was born in Deir al-Zour in 1864 for Al-Haj family from the Abo Obaid clan from Al-Baggara tribe., He grew up in a national family that contributed to the struggle against the colonizers throughout history, Therefore, Ayyash was liking his city and his homeland, and a lover of its material and immaterial traditions, and that is why he devoted most of his life to the service and protection of his city. When the Ottomans left Deir ez-Zor, Ayyash Al-Haj contributed to protecting the people of Deir ez-Zor from the chaos and the absence of security left by the absence of the Ottoman authority. He formed a local government known as Haj Fadel Government with the dignitaries of Deir ez-Zor, headed by his cousin from the Abu Obaid clan, Fadel Al-Aboud in 1918.

He established a national army from the people of the city with Mr. Omar Al-'Abd Al-'Aziz and Mr. Khalaf Al-'Abd Al-Hamid to counter the invasion of the English and clashed with them at the site of Salhiya in 1919.

Ayyash Al-Haj also contributed to resolving many conflicts and revolutions between the people of Deir ez-Zor and between them and the people of the countryside due to his close ties with Al-Baggara tribes, his cousins and close friends of the Albu Saraya clan, who later participated with his sons in the formation of armed revolutionary groups against the French forces.

The French sentenced him to exile in the city of Jableh with his family members in 1925; they also sentenced his eldest son Mohammad to 20 years' imprisonment and executed his son Mahmoud by firing squad, after being convicted of planning and carrying out several military operations against French forces in Syria, the most recent of which was the epic of Ain Bou Juma in 1925.

Ayyash and his family left to their exile in the city of Jableh where the people of the city embraced him and were respected him for their struggle and virtues.

Shortly after Ayyash Al-Haj family's living in Jableh, The French authorities assassinated Ayyash Al-Haj in a café outside the city by poisoning his coffee, and prevented the transfer of his body to Deir Ezzor city for reasons of public security, He was buried in Jableh in the cemetery of Sultan Ibrahim ibn Adham Mosque where the absent prayers held for the spirit of this martyr mujahid in all the Syrian cities.

== See also ==
- Haj Fadel Government
