= Ayyash Al-Haj =

Syrian leader

- عياش الحاج حسين الجاسم
- Born: 1864; Deir ez-Zor, Ottoman Syria
- Died: 1926 (aged 61–62); Jableh, State of Syria
- Cause of death: Assassinated by French colonial authorities
- Body discovered: Mosque of Sultan Ibrahim ibn Adham, Jableh, Syria
- Title: The Arab Prince
- Relatives: Fadel Al-Aboud

Ayyash Al-Haj Hussein Al-Jassim (Arabic: عياش الحاج حسين الجاسم) was a Syrian revolutionary who led the armed resistance against the French in the Deir al-Zour Governorate in 1925 during the Great Syrian Revolt. He was exiled with his family to the city of Jableh in western Syria after being accused of planning and preparing future uprisings against the French. His eldest son, Mohammed, was sentenced to 20 years in prison on the island of Arwad, while his son Mahmoud was executed by firing squad alongside several other revolutionaries.

Shortly after Al-Haj and his family were exiled to Jableh, he was assassinated by the French authorities in a café on the outskirts of the city when they poisoned his coffee. For security reasons, they also prevented the return of his body to his hometown of Deir ez-Zor. He was laid to rest in Jableh, in the cemetery of the Sultan Ibrahim ibn Adham Mosque, where absentee funeral prayers were held for the soul of the martyred mujahid across all Syrian cities.

== Lineage ==
Ayyash was born in Deir al-Zour in 1864 to the Al-Haj family, part of the Abo Obaid clan of the Baggara tribe.

== Personal life ==
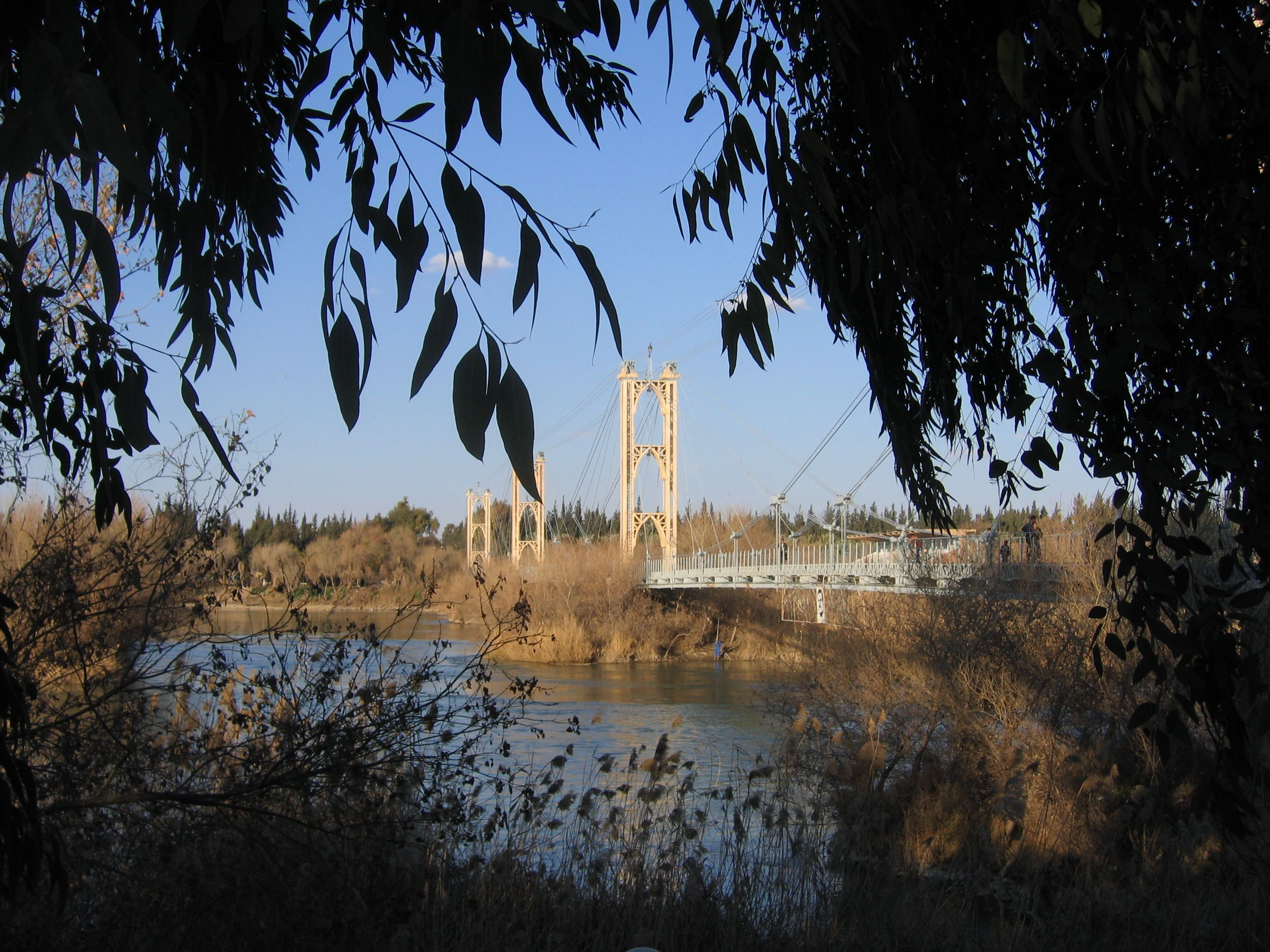
Hanging bridge, Deir al zor.

Ayyash Al-Haj was raised in a patriotic family with a long history of resisting foreign colonizers. His deep love for his city and homeland shaped his character, driving him to dedicate much of his life to serving and defending his community.

After the Ottomans withdrew from Deir ez-Zor, Ayyash Al-Haj played an important role in safeguarding the city's residents from the chaos and security vacuum that followed their departure. In 1918, he helped establish a local government known as the Haj Fadel Government, alongside the city's dignitaries and under the leadership of his cousin from the Abu Obaid clan, Fadel Al-Aboud.

He helped form a national army composed of local residents, working alongside Omar Al-‘Abd Al-‘Aziz and Khalaf Al-‘Abd Al-Hamid, to confront the British invasion. In 1919, they fought together against the British forces at the Battle of Salhiya.

Ayyash Al-Haj also played a key role in resolving numerous disputes and uprisings between the residents of Deir ez-Zor and those of the surrounding countryside. His strong ties with the Baggara tribes particularly the Albu Saraya clan, who were both his relatives and close allies helped him mediate these tensions. Members of this clan would later join his sons in forming armed resistance groups against the French forces.

In 1925, the French authorities sentenced him to exile in the city of Jableh along with his family. They also sentenced his eldest son, Mohammad, to twenty years in prison, and executed his son Mahmoud by firing squad after accusing him of organizing and carrying out several military operations against the French in Syria the last of which was the notable epic battle of Ain Bou Juma in 1925.

Ayyash and his family departed for their exile in the city of Jableh, where the local residents welcomed them warmly and held them in high regard for their courage, integrity, and role in the national struggle.

== Sons ==
Ayyash Al-Haj was married to Ms. Qmorh Al-Aboud, the sister of Fadel Al-Aboud, the head of the Deir Ezzor government. He had seven sons and three daughters, and each of his sons held a distinguished position in Deir Ezzor. Among his sons were:

=== Mohammed Al-Ayyash ===
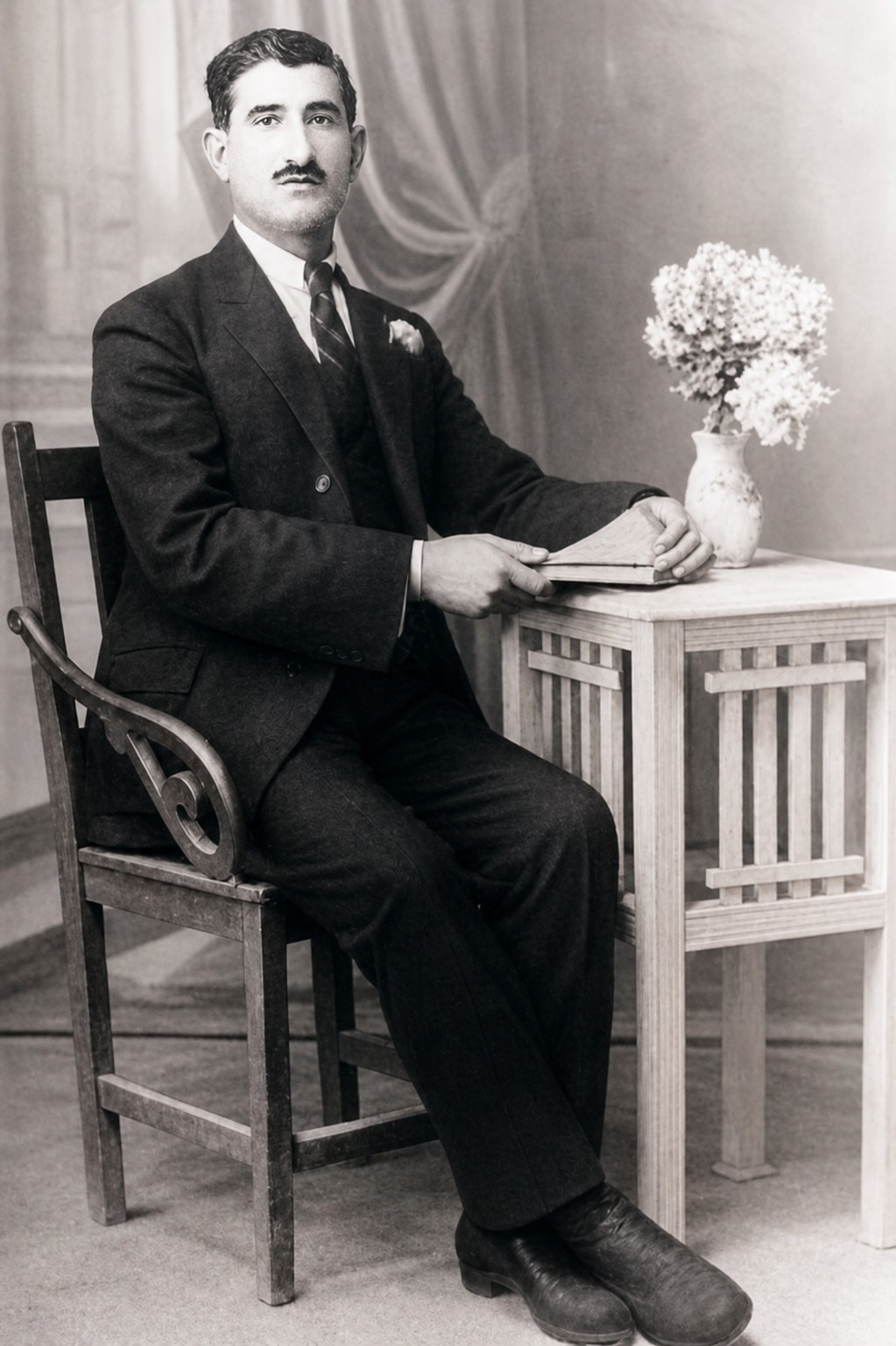
Mohammed Bey Al-Ayyash

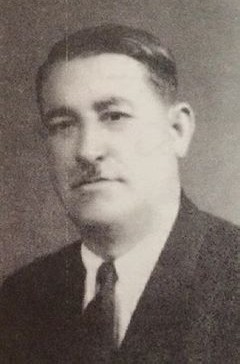
Ahmed Al-Ayyash

A prominent politician, writer, and symbol of sovereignty and leadership in Deir Ezzor, he was born in the city in 1894. He became involved in political activity at an early age, helping to establish the national movement against French colonial rule and advocating for Syria's independence alongside figures such as Sheikh Mohammed Said Al-Arafi and Thabit Azzawi.

He maintained continuous communication with nationalists and revolutionaries across Syria, including Dr. Abdul Rahman Shahbandar, with whom he coordinated to launch armed operations in Deir Ezzor in parallel with the outbreak of the Great Syrian Revolt in Jabal al-Arab and the Ghouta of Damascus. He went on to form a revolutionary group in the Deir ez-Zor region that carried out several military operations against the French forces, the most notable of which was the heroic Battle of Ain Albu Juma.

He was sentenced by the French in 1925 to twenty years in prison and was incarcerated on Arwad Island. He was released following the French amnesty issued in 1937 and later passed away in Deir Ezzor in 1944.

=== Mahmoud Al-Ayyash (Abu Stita) ===
He was born in Deir Ezzor in 1898 and was widely respected for his dignity and courage. The people of Deir Ezzor nicknamed him "Abu Stita." He formed a revolutionary group with several of his comrades and carried out numerous military operations against the French forces, the most notable being the epic Battle of Ain Albu Juma referred to by modern historians as the "Denshway of the Euphrates.”

A model of sacrifice, he left a distinguished legacy of heroism in the national struggle, raising the banner of freedom high. On 5 September 1925, Mahmoud Al-Ayyash was executed along with twelve fellow revolutionaries. The French military court carried out the execution by firing squad in northern Aleppo.

=== Ahmed Al-Ayyash ===
A true patriot, Ahmed was known for his strong character, generosity, and sense of honor. He was elected president of the Workers’ Union in 1932 after the "Al Meera" incident, during which he led a group of men to break the locks and open grain warehouses that had been monopolized by the French, ensuring the supplies reached the people. He also led demonstrations against the French authorities and was imprisoned several times for his nationalistic stance.

=== Abdul Qader Al-Ayyash ===
Abdul Qader Al-Ayyash

One of the distinguished figures of Deir Ezzor, he was born in the city in 1911. He began his career as a real estate judge in Aleppo in 1936, later serving in Maarat al-Nu'man and then in Deir Ezzor. He also worked as a judge in Damascus. In 1941, he was appointed director of the Al-Bab District in Aleppo, a post he held for two years before being transferred to the Salamiyah District.

In 1943, he resigned from government service and returned to Deir Ezzor to practice law. In addition to his legal work, he served for several years as the state attorney for government cases and was appointed to the Municipal Council of Deir Ezzor in 1944.

He founded the Cultural House Club in Deir Ezzor in 1944, where he delivered literary and historical lectures and hosted many of the leading intellectuals of the Euphrates region at the time, including the renowned poet Mohammed Al-Furati. The club was later shut down during the presidency of Hosni Al-Zaim in 1948, despite being privately owned by Abdul Qader Al-Ayyash, who personally financed all of its expenses.

In 1945 he published the Voice of the Euphrates magazine at his own expense, the first monthly cultural magazine in Deir Ezzor, its articles were limited to the definition of the civilization of the Euphrates Valley and the history of its cities and describe its economy and codify and highlight its famous heritage.

In 1945, he founded and personally financed The Voice of the Euphrates magazine, the first monthly cultural publication in Deir Ezzor. Its articles focused on introducing the civilization of the Euphrates Valley, documenting the history of its cities, describing its economy, and preserving and showcasing its rich cultural heritage.

He founded and chaired the "Adiyat" Society in Deir Ezzor in 1958. In 1961, he became president of the Supreme Council for the Welfare of Arts, Letters, and Social Sciences in the United Arab Republic, where he continued his efforts to document and preserve the civilization of the Euphrates Valley. He was also a member of the Arab Writers Union, the Geographical Society, and the Scientific Research Society at Damascus University.

He founded the first museum in the city of Deir al-Zour in 1957 known as the Museum of Folk Traditions, the current Deir ez-Zor Museum still contains many archaeological collections of Mr. Al-Ayyash, which he bought from his own money and Donated to the museum. The Syrian Ministry of Culture published a dictionary of Syrian authors which was written by Abdul Qader Al-Ayyash in 1982, and the Ministry of Folklore also issued three books were written by him.

He founded the first museum in Deir al-Zour in 1957, known at the time as the Museum of Folk Traditions. Many of the archaeological pieces he personally purchased and donated are still preserved in the present-day Deir ez-Zor Museum. In 1982, the Syrian Ministry of Culture published his Dictionary of Syrian Authors, and the Ministry of Folklore later released three additional books authored by him.

He passed away in Deir Ezzor in 1974, after having enriched the Arab library with more than 117 books in the fields of history, folklore, and literature. In a message of condolence sent to one of his relatives, President Hafez al-Assad described him as a "loss to the homeland."

== The epic battle of Ain Albu Gomaa ==
French newspaper article linking the killing of the two French officers, Vannières and Wysocki, near Deir ez-Zor in 1925 to Mohammed Al-Ayyash, and referring to his coordination with Dr. Abd al-Rahman Shahbandar and the People's Party in Damascus. Journal des Débats politiques et littéraires, 10 November 1925, p. 2. View article.

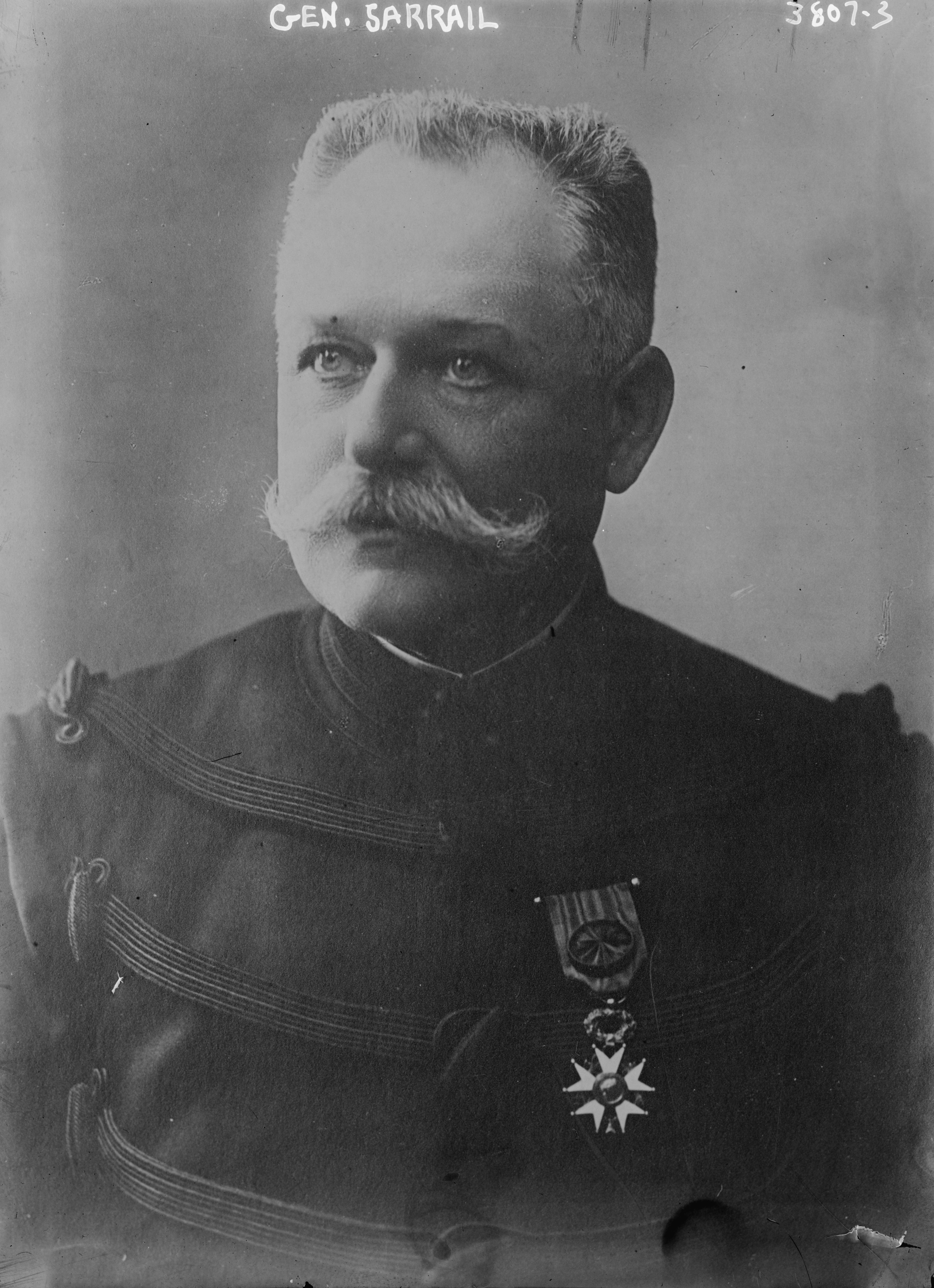
French General Maurice Sarrail, The High Commissioner of the French Mandate of Syria

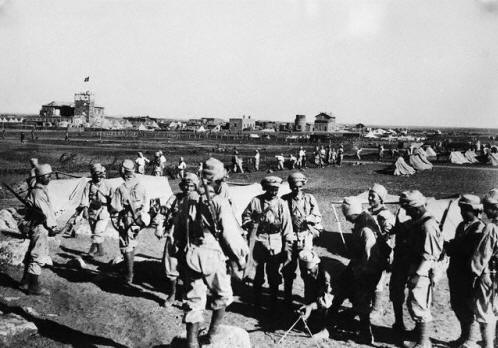
French occupation forces

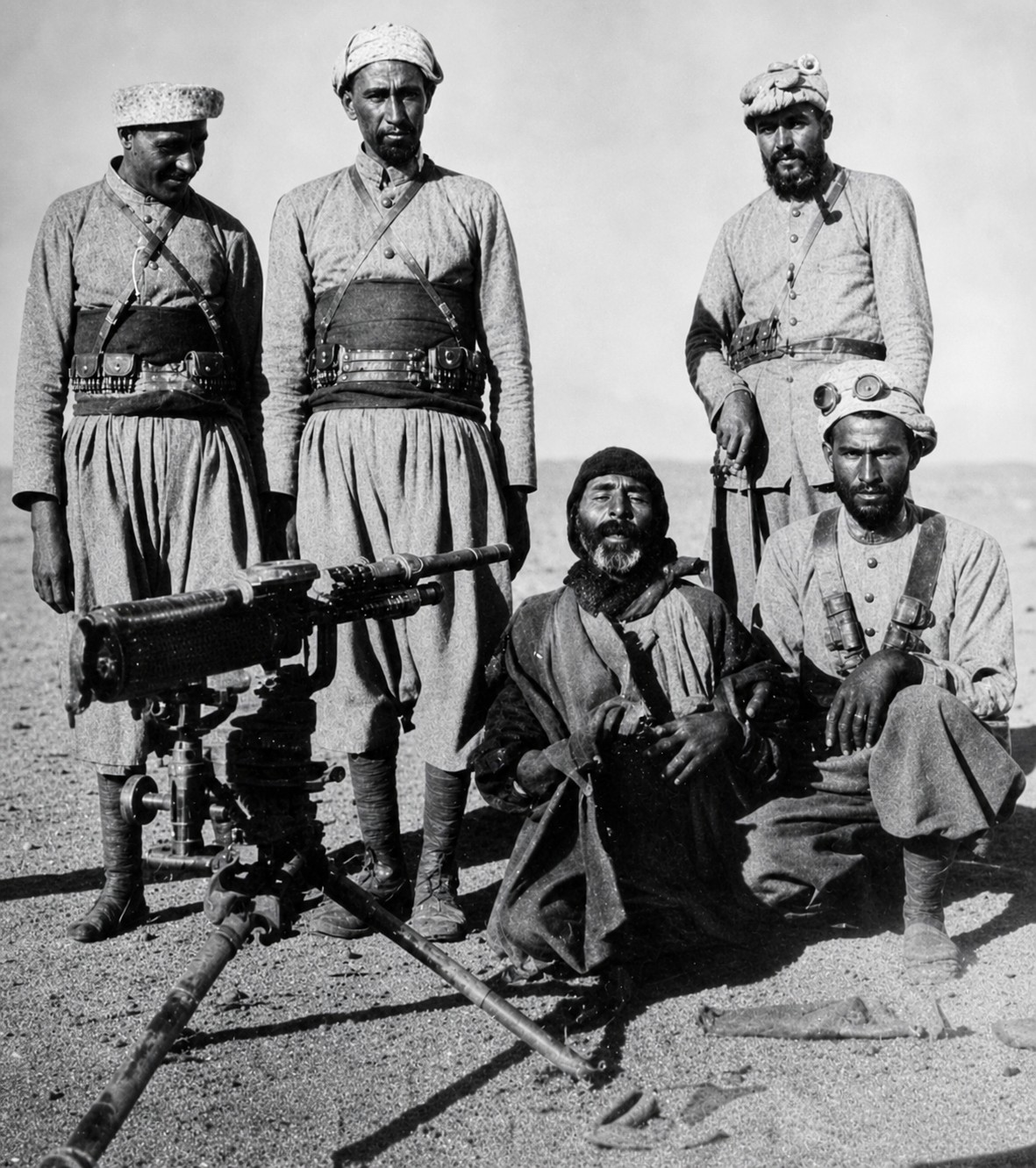
Hassan Al-Abed Al-Salamah, the moment of his execution by the French occupation

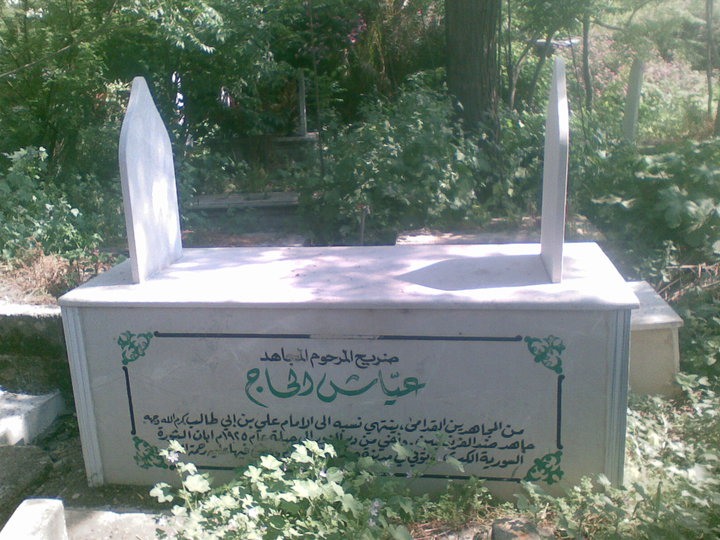
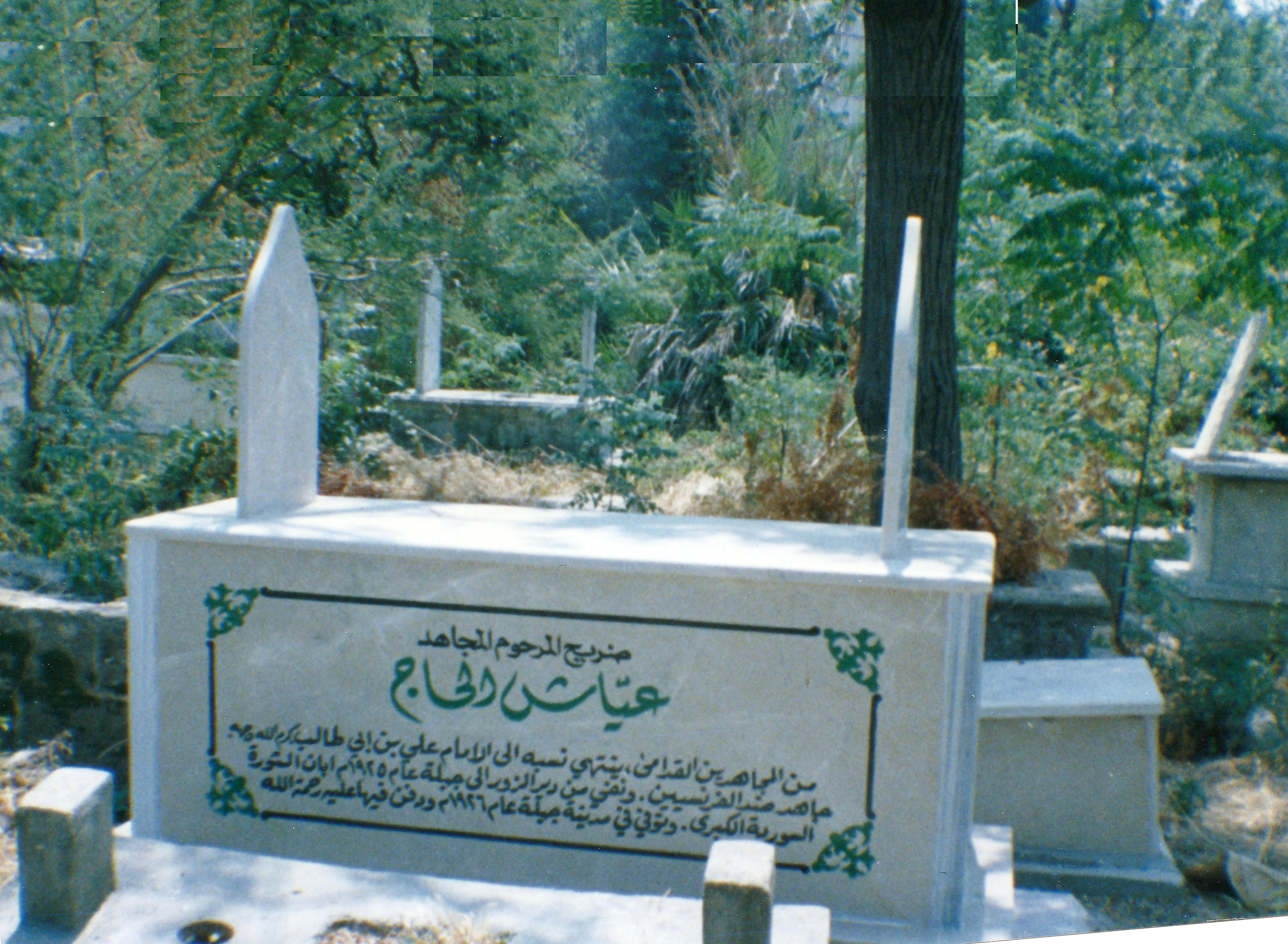
Ayyash Al-Hajj grave at the Sultan Ibrahim al-Adham mosque in Jableh.

There had been coordination between the leaders of the Great Syrian Revolution and several patriots from eastern Syria, including Mohammed Al-Ayyash. In Damascus, he met with Dr. Abdul Rahman Shahbandar, leader of the People's Party, and discussed the possibility of extending the revolution to the Euphrates region to open a new front against the French, disperse their forces, and relieve pressure on the rebels in Ghouta and Jabal al-Arab.

After returning to Deir Ezzor, Mohammed Al-Ayyash began rallying the people and encouraging them to join the fight. He and his brother Mahmoud then traveled to the villages of the Albu Saraya clan longtime friends of their father, Ayyash Al-Haj, and residents of the western countryside of Deir ez-Zor to form a revolutionary group with them aimed at striking the French forces.

Mohammed Al-Ayyash succeeded in forming a revolutionary group of thirteen armed men who were prepared to carry out military operations against the French forces. They were:

1. Mahmoud Al-Ayyash
2. Hakami Al-Abed Al-Salameh (Al-Shumaitiya Village).
3. Aziz Al-Ali Al-Salamah (Al-Shumaitiya Village).
4. Haji Ali Al-Abed Al-Salama (Al-Shumaitiya Village).
5. Hassan Al-Abed Al-Salamah (Al-Shumaitiya Village).
6. Hamza Al-Abed Al-Salama (Al-Shumaitiya Village).
7. Aslibi Masoud Al-Abdul Jalil (Al-Shumaitiya Village).
8. Khaleef Al-Hassan Al-Muhammad (Al-Kuraitia Village).
9. Lions of Hamdan (Al-Kuraitia Village).
10. Ahmed Al-Hassan (Al-Kuraitia Village).
11. Hameed Al-Sultan (Al-Kuraitia Village).
12. Abdullah Al-Khalaf Ibrahim (Deir Ezzor city).
13. Hamad Bin Rdaini – Al-Baggara tribe.

Although some individuals worked with the French in translation centers and other fields, they secretly supported the revolutionaries. They regularly provided Mohammed Al-Ayyash with information about French activities, troop movements, and the timing of their military operations. Relying on this intelligence, Mohammed Al-Ayyash directed the revolutionaries toward effective strikes against the French forces.

In early June 1925, the translators informed Mohammed Bey Al-Ayyash that a military vehicle carrying two French officers (Commandant Vannière, Commandant Visovski) recently arrived from France to inspect military construction departments in Syria and Lebanon along with their French driver, was scheduled to depart Deir Ezzor for Aleppo. Mohammed instructed his brother Mahmoud to prepare an ambush in the area of Ain Albu Gomaa on the Deir Ezzor Raqqa road, where the highway passes through a deep valley crossed by a narrow stone bridge.

When the military vehicle arrived, the revolutionaries launched their attack, capturing the officers and taking them, along with their car, to a desert area known as Al-Aksiyya. There, they threw the officers and their driver into an abandoned well, where they perished.

The French, furious at losing contact with their officers, launched an extensive search campaign that included the use of planes. Upon discovering the bodies and learning the identities of the revolutionaries, they dispatched a large military force, equipped with heavy artillery and aircraft, to attack the Albu Saraya clan and lay siege to their villages.

“If each of the criminals who committed this terrible act deserves to die once, then their leader, Mohammed Al-Ayyash, deserves to be hanged twice.”

— Officer Bono 1925.

French planes began bombarding the villages of the clan in a horrific and devastating assault. Homes were destroyed, children and women were killed, livestock slaughtered, and farms and crops set ablaze. Many civilians were injured or killed by bullets and shrapnel from the bombs. All of this was intended to pressure the population into revealing the whereabouts of the revolutionaries.

When the French realized that the bombing had not forced a surrender, they resorted to a despicable tactic: threatening to arrest the revolutionaries’ female relatives their mothers and sisters unless the fighters gave themselves up. Upon receiving this news, the revolutionaries emerged from their hideouts and surrendered to protect their women from arrest.

Revolutionaries were tried in Aleppo, where the family of Ayyash Al-Haj appointed lawyer Fathallah Al-Saqqal to defend them, the court heard (Officer Bono) head of the French intelligence in Deir Ezzor, who said: If each of the criminals, who committed this terrible offense deserve dying once, the gang leader Mohammed Al-Ayyash deserves hanging twice.

The French High Commissioner in Beirut, Maurice Sarrail, issued Decision No. 49S / 5 in August 1925, which ordered the exile of all members of the Ayyash Al-Haj family to the city of Jableh, Mahmoud Al-Ayyash and 12 of his companions were sentenced to death. The execution was carried out by firing squad on 15 September 1925 in Aleppo. Muhammad Al-Ayyash was sentenced to 20 years of imprisonment on the island of Arwad in Tartous city.

== Death ==
Shortly after Ayyash Al-Haj and his family settled in Jableh, the French authorities assassinated him in a café on the outskirts of the city by poisoning his coffee. They also barred the return of his body to Deir Ezzor for what they claimed were security reasons. He was laid to rest in Jableh, in the cemetery of the Sultan Ibrahim ibn Adham Mosque, and absentee funeral prayers were held for the soul of the martyred mujahid across all Syrian cities. Many poets from Deir Ezzor mourned him, including the renowned poet Mohammed Al-Furati.

== See also ==
- Great Syrian Revolt
- Sultan Al-Atrash
- Hasan al-Kharrat
- Ibrahim Hananu
- Yusuf al-'Azma
- Abd al-Rahman Shahbandar
- Saleh Al-Ali
- Fawzi al-Qawuqji
- The epic of Ain Albu Gomaa
- Mandate for Syria and the Lebanon
- Henri Gouraud
- Maurice Sarrail
- Syria
- Deir ez-Zor
- Adham Khanjar
- Fadel Al-Aboud
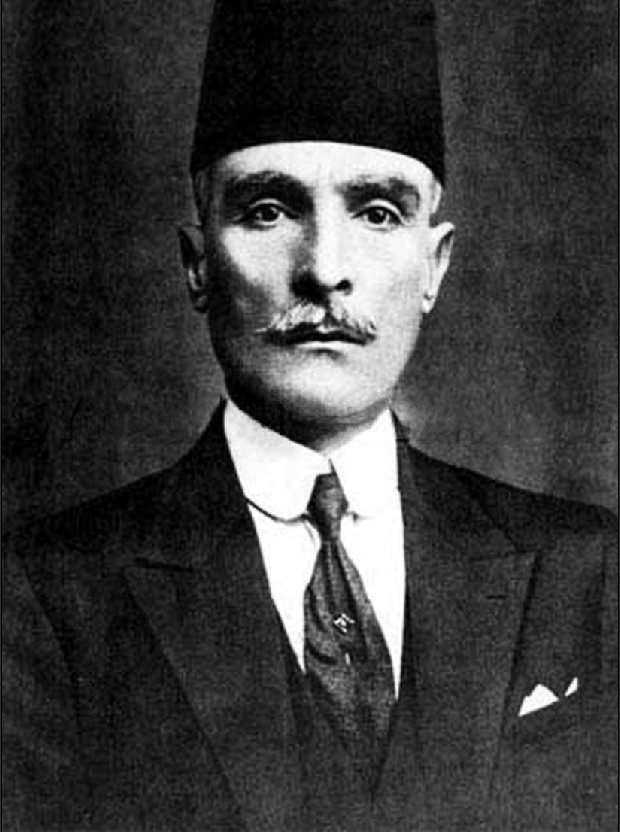
Ibrahim Hananu

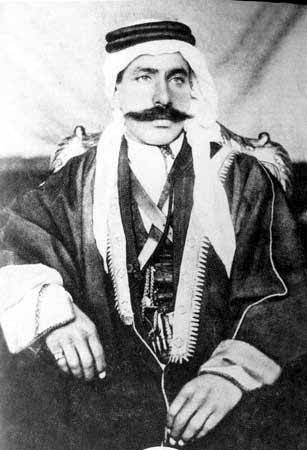
Sultan Al-Atrash

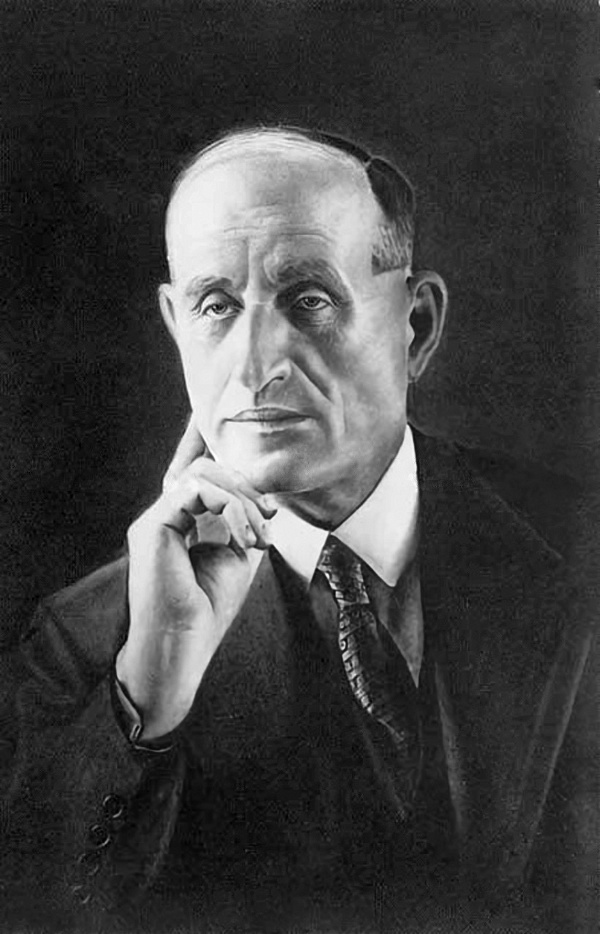
Abd al-Rahman Shahbandar

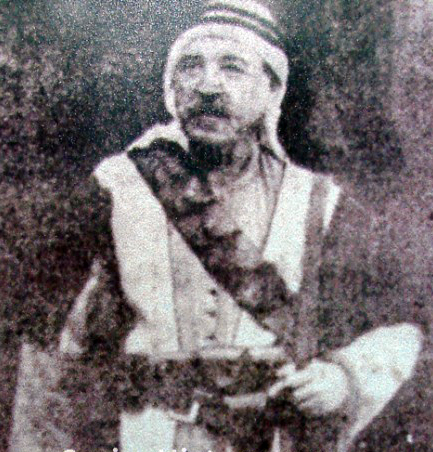
Saleh Al-Ali

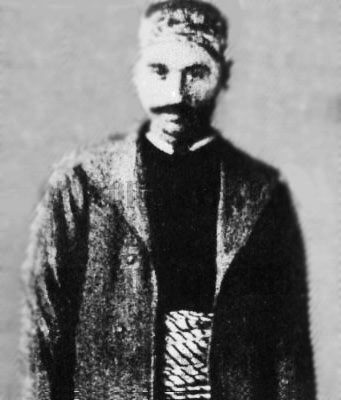
Hasan al-Kharrat

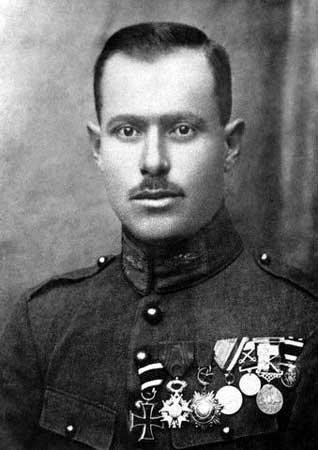
Fawzi al-Qawuqji
