= Deir ez-Zor camps =

Armenian genocide concentration camps

- Concentration camp
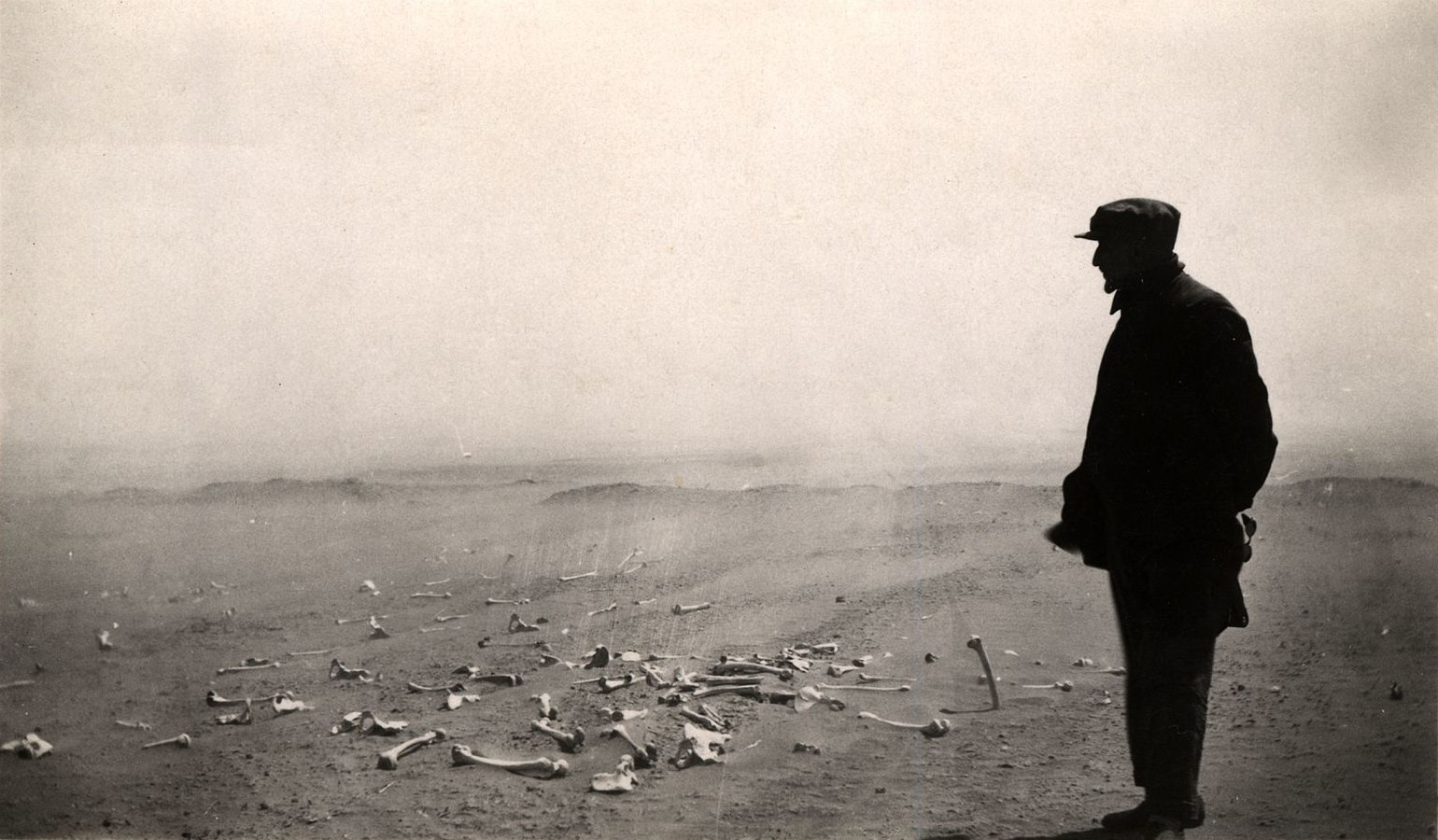
- Bodil Biørn's caption: "The Armenian leader Papasian considers the last remnants of the horrific murders at Deir ez-Zor in 1915–1916."

- Location of Deir ez-Zor in contemporary Syria
- Coordinates: 35°20′00″N 40°9′00″E
- Known for: Mass murder of Ottoman Armenians during the Armenian genocide
- Location: Deir ez-Zor, Ottoman Empire (present-day Syria)
- Operated by: Ottoman Empire: Ottoman army
- Operational: 1910s
- Inmates: Armenians
- Killed: 150,000

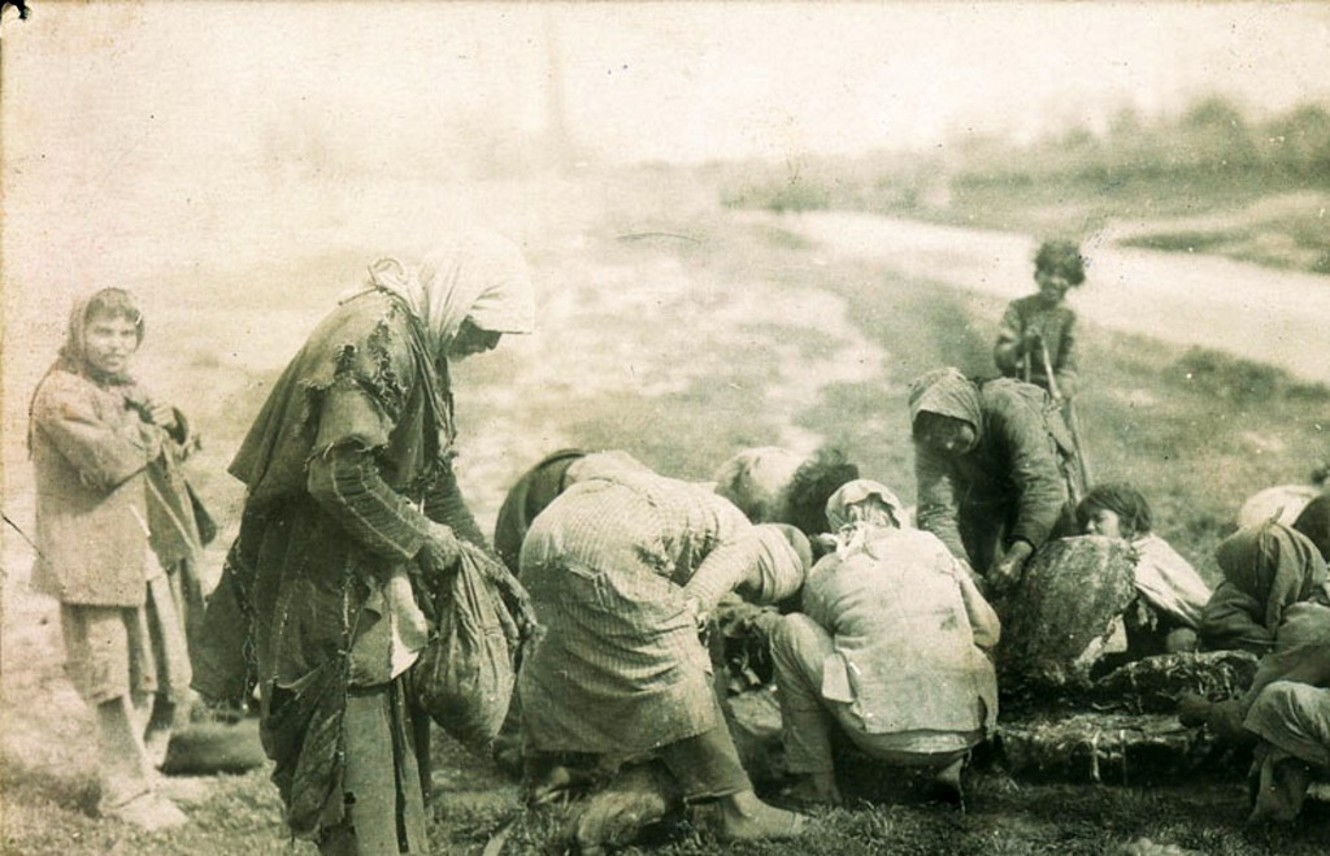
Armenian refugees collected near the body of a dead horse at Deir ez-Zor

The Deir ez-Zor (Der Zor) camps were makeshift concentration camps in the heart of the Syrian Desert in which many thousands of Armenian refugees were forced into death marches during the Armenian genocide and ultimately died due to starvation, dehydration, harsh environmental exposure, burning alive, suffocation, and massacre. It is estimated that up to 700,000 Armenians were killed in the concentration camps between 1915 and 1918. Armenians were marched to Aleppo before their final stop in Deir ez-Zor.

Although Deir ez-Zor was the most prominent deportation location, 25 concentration camps existed around Aleppo, including in Al Bab, Manbij, Meskeneh, Raqqa, Ras al-Ayn, and Abu Harera.

== Background ==
The Ottoman government persecuted the Armenian people and forced them to march out to the Syrian city of Deir al-Zour and the surrounding desert without any facilities and supplies that would have been necessary to sustain the life of hundreds of thousands of Armenian deportees during and after their forced march to the Syrian desert.

Haj Fadel Al-Aboud, who was the mayor of Deir al-Zour, provided them with food and housing and means of livelihood and security. The Armenians returned the favor to Al-Aboud when French colonial authorities sentenced him to death in Aleppo; they supported and defended him, which led the French to reduce the sentence to exile in Jisr al-Shughur.

== Conditions at the camps ==
According to Minority Rights Group,

Those who survived the long journey south were herded into huge open-air concentration camps, the grimmest of which was Deir-ez-Zor...where they were starved and killed by sadistic guards. A small number escaped through the secret protection of friendly Arabs from villages in Northern Syria.

Those Armenians who survived during the genocide in 1915-1916 were driven onwards in two directions: towards Damascus or along the Euphrates to Deir ez-Zor. During the early period of massacres, 30,000 Armenians were encamped in various camps outside the town of Deir ez-Zor. The camps were makeshift with a cave being used to store prisoners until they starved. Thousands of children were suffocated in the caves at Deir ez-Zor.

Between August and September in 1916, more than 200,000 Armenians were massacred, burned alive, or drowned in Deir ez-Zor. In 2010, the Armenian Genocide Museum Institute uncovered a photo which revealed a photo of the camp Ras ul-Ayn, consisting of tents strewn out in the desert. In 1916, the Ambassador Wangenheim wrote in a report to Berlin that the persecution of Armenians had reached its "final stage" with Turkish officials "destroying the Armenian race" using "concentration camps."

The Armenians that arrived were under the protection of the Arab governor, Ali Suad Bey, until the Ottoman authorities decided to replace him with Salih Zeki Bey, who was known for his cruelty and barbarity. At the camps, the deportees including women and children cooked grass, ate sick and dead animals, the peels of fruit, the corns of barley drawn out of horse manure, and human flesh. The Turkish government withheld food and water from the deportees in the camp. Starvation was deliberately chosen by the Young Turk regime as a tool of genocide, as it enabled plausible deniability and also prolonged the victims' suffering. Armenian women and girls were sold, abducted, or taken as forced brides by Turkish and Kurdish militia.

Sickness and hunger were widespread in the camps and the Armenians were forced to live with little shelter in a hot, arid climate. Severe overcrowding, exposure, exhaustion, and malnutrition in the camps led to widespread diseases such as dysentery, typhus, and pneumonia, causing many deaths among the deportees. Deportation organizers reportedly kept weakened people in the camps for long periods, possibly to encourage deadly epidemics, but the outbreaks became so severe that some camps were closed because Turkish military officials feared the diseases would spread to their troops.

According to Christopher J. Walker, "'Deportation' was just a euphemism for mass murder. No provision was made for their journey or exile, and unless they could bribe their guards, they were forbidden in almost all cases food and water". Those who survived landed up between Jerablus and Deir ez-Zor, "a vast and horrific open-air concentration camp". According to the writer and engineer, Jude Seleck, "Deir ez-Zor was not chosen as a resettlement destination but as a mass grave", adding that the Committee of Union and Progress' ..."selection of Deir ez-Zor is analogous to the Nazis' initial plan of utilizing the island of Madagascar...as a mandatory deportation site for Jews durin the 1940s."

The United States vice-consul in Aleppo, Jesse B. Jackson, at the time estimated that Armenian refugees, as far east as Deir ez-Zor and south of Damascus, numbered 150,000, all of whom were virtually destitute. Contemporary historical analyses estimate that up to 700,000 Armenians were killed in the concentration camps between 1915 and 1918. Certain Arab tribes, both Muslim and Eastern Orthodox, extended humanitarian assistance to the deportees in the region of Deir ez-Zor.

== Memorial ==
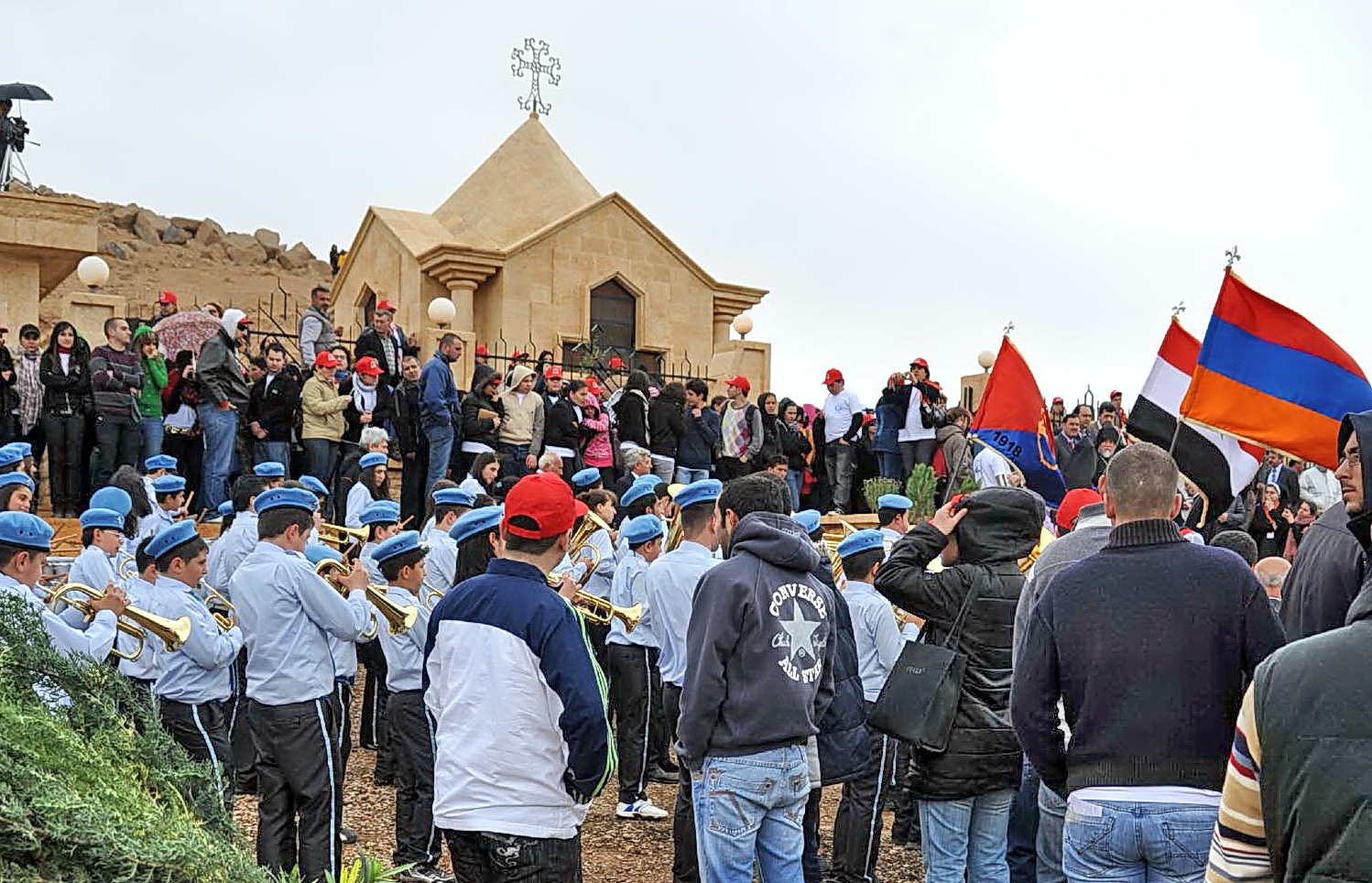
Armenian pilgrims gathered in the Syrian village of Margadeh, near Deir ez-Zor, to commemorate the 94th anniversary of the Armenian genocide

In the village of Margadeh, (88 km from Deir ez-Zor, an Armenian chapel dedicated to those massacred there during the genocide "houses some of the bones of the dead". Lebanese and Syrians make pilgrimages to this memorial organized by the Armenian Apostolic Church of Aleppo. Bones from the victims of the camps have been identified in the nearby desert by those making pilgrimages as late as 1996.

Nouritza Matossian wrote for Armenian Voice:

Last month I visited the desert of Deir-ez-Zor in the killing fields, caves and rivers where a million Armenians perished. I was shown a piece of land that keeps subsiding. It is called the Place of the Armenians. So many thousands of bodies were buried there that the ground has been sinking for the last 80 years. Human thigh bones and ribs come to the surface.

"For Armenians, Der Zor has come to have a meaning approximate to Auschwitz", wrote Peter Balakian in The New York Times. "Each, in different ways, an epicenter of death and a systematic process of mass-killing; each a symbolic place, an epigrammatic name on a dark map. Der Zor is a term that sticks with you, or sticks on you, like a burr or thorn: "r" "z" "or" — hard, sawing, knifelike". In 2010, the President of Armenia, Serzh Sarkisian, stated: "Quite often historians and journalists soundly compare Deir ez Zor with Auschwitz saying that 'Deir ez Zor is the Auschwitz of the Armenians'. I think that the chronology forces us to formulate the facts in a reverse way: 'Auschwitz is the Deir ez Zor of the Jews'.

The memorial and museum were destroyed by ISIL in 2014. The site was recaptured in 2017. Syrian President Bashar al-Assad had previously pledged to restore the site, as part of the rebuilding of Syria, but the site remains ruined in post-Assad Syria.

== Gallery ==
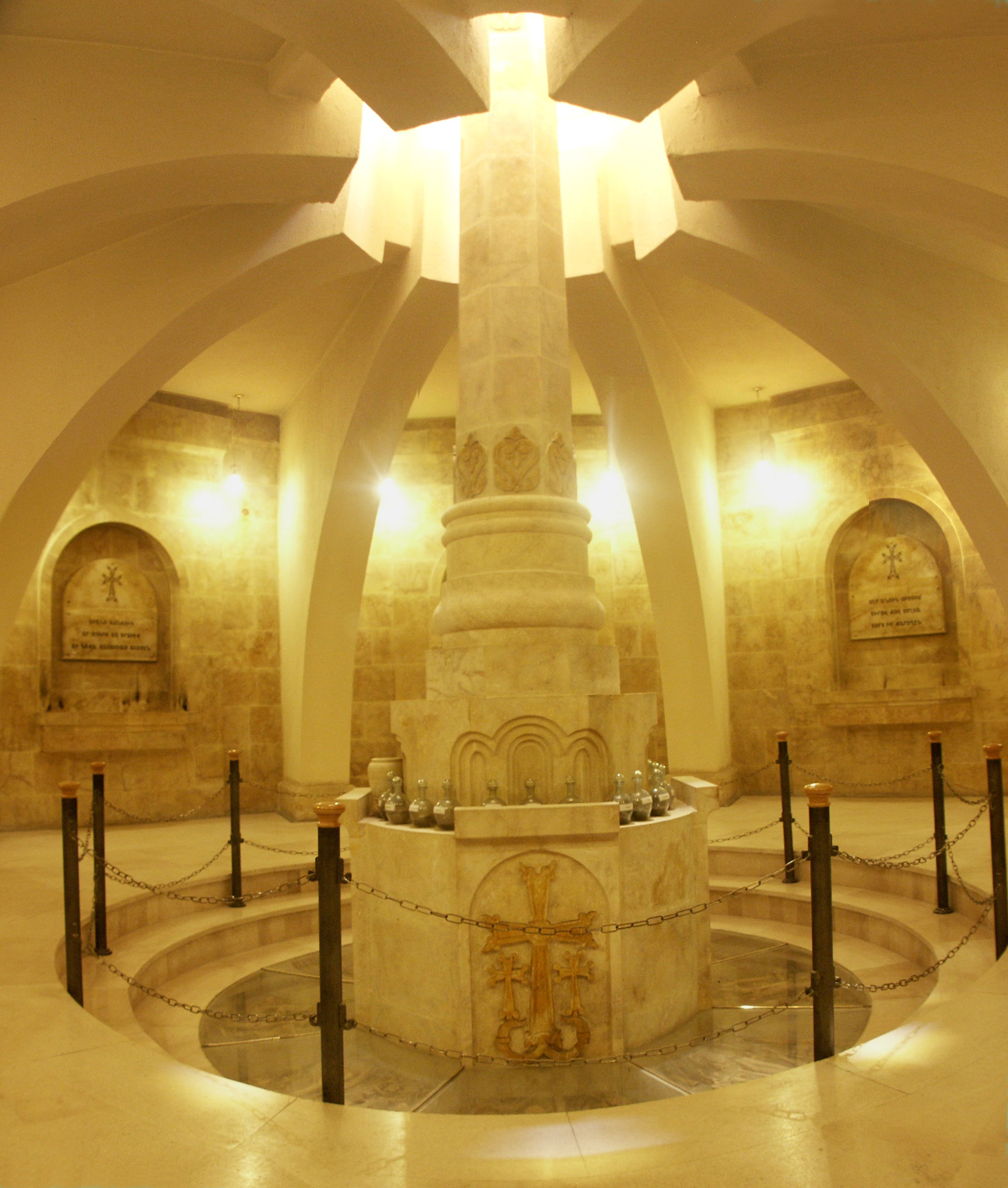
The Armenian Genocide museum in Deir ez Zor

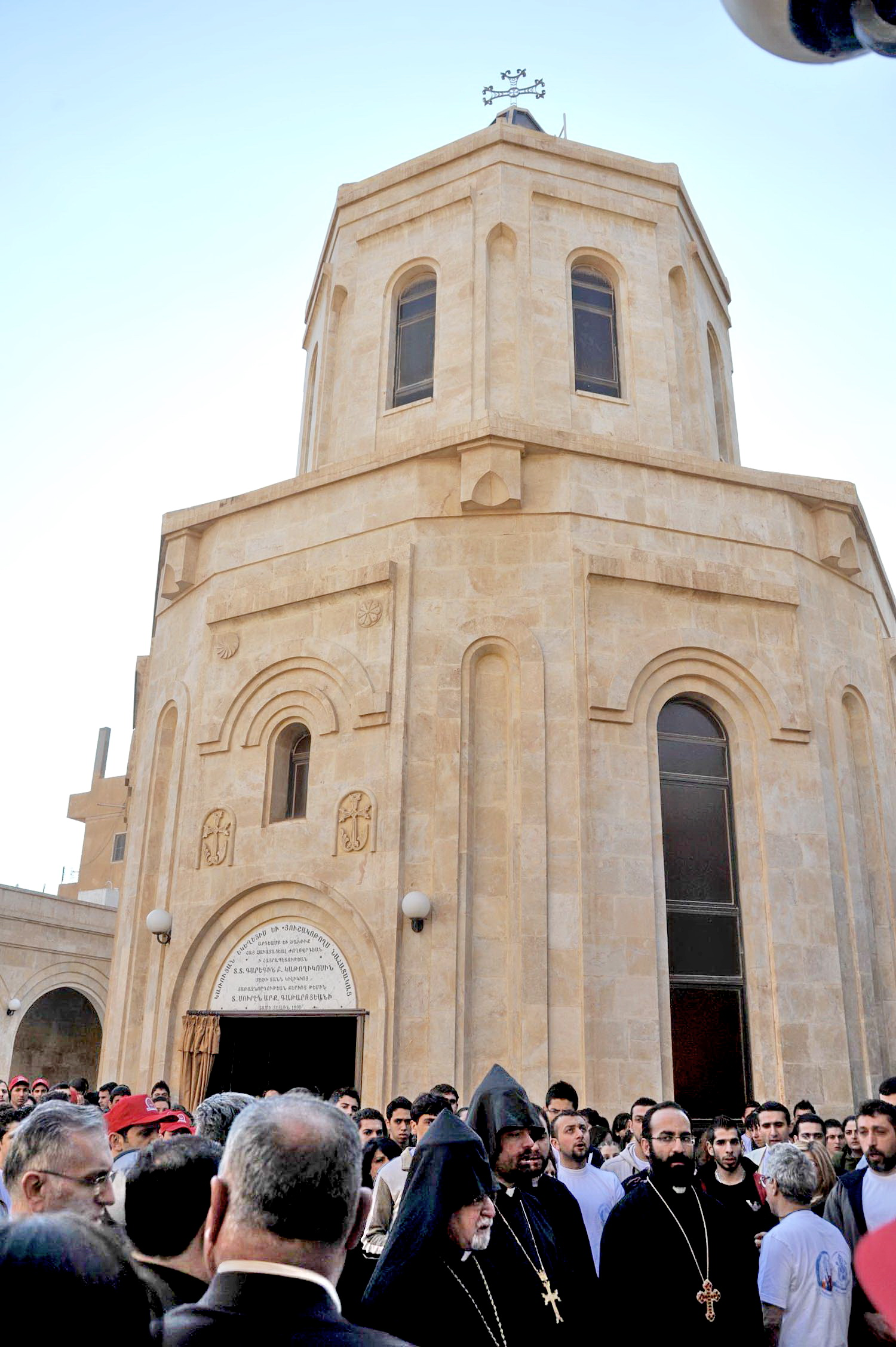
The Armenian Genocide Memorial in Deir ez Zor

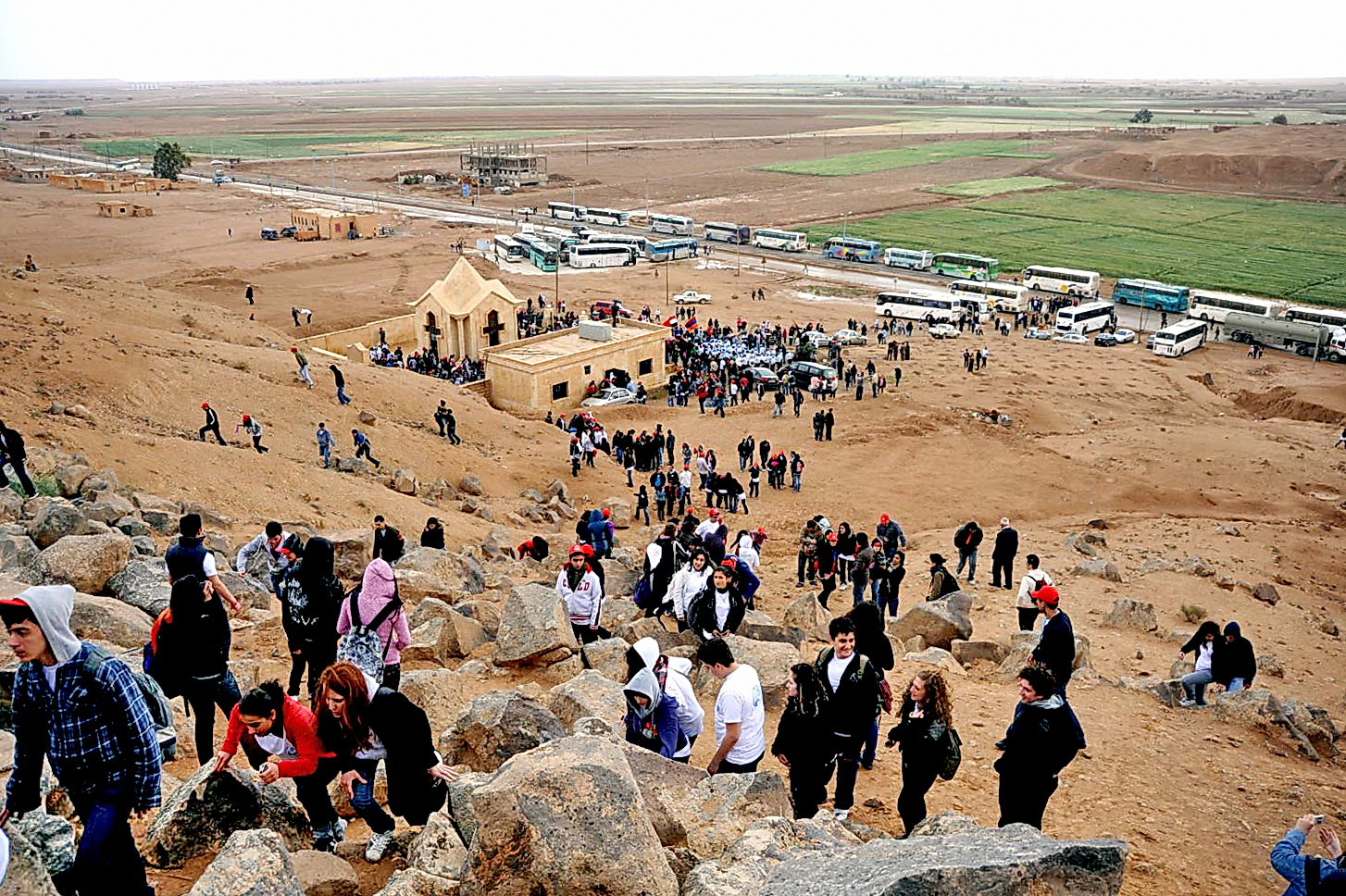
The Surp Harutyun (Holy Resurrection) Chapel of Margadeh village

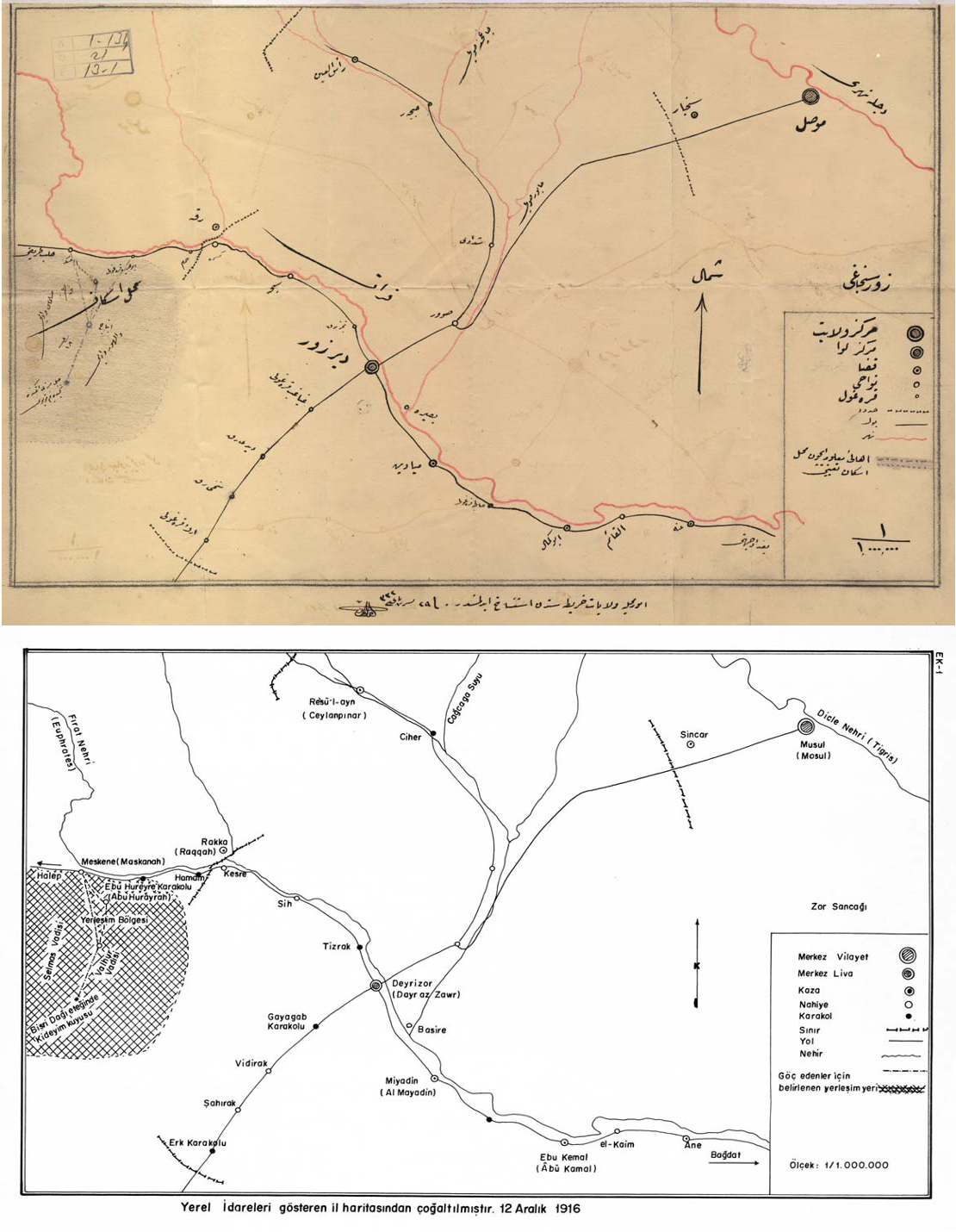
Armenian refugee camp at Deir ez Zor

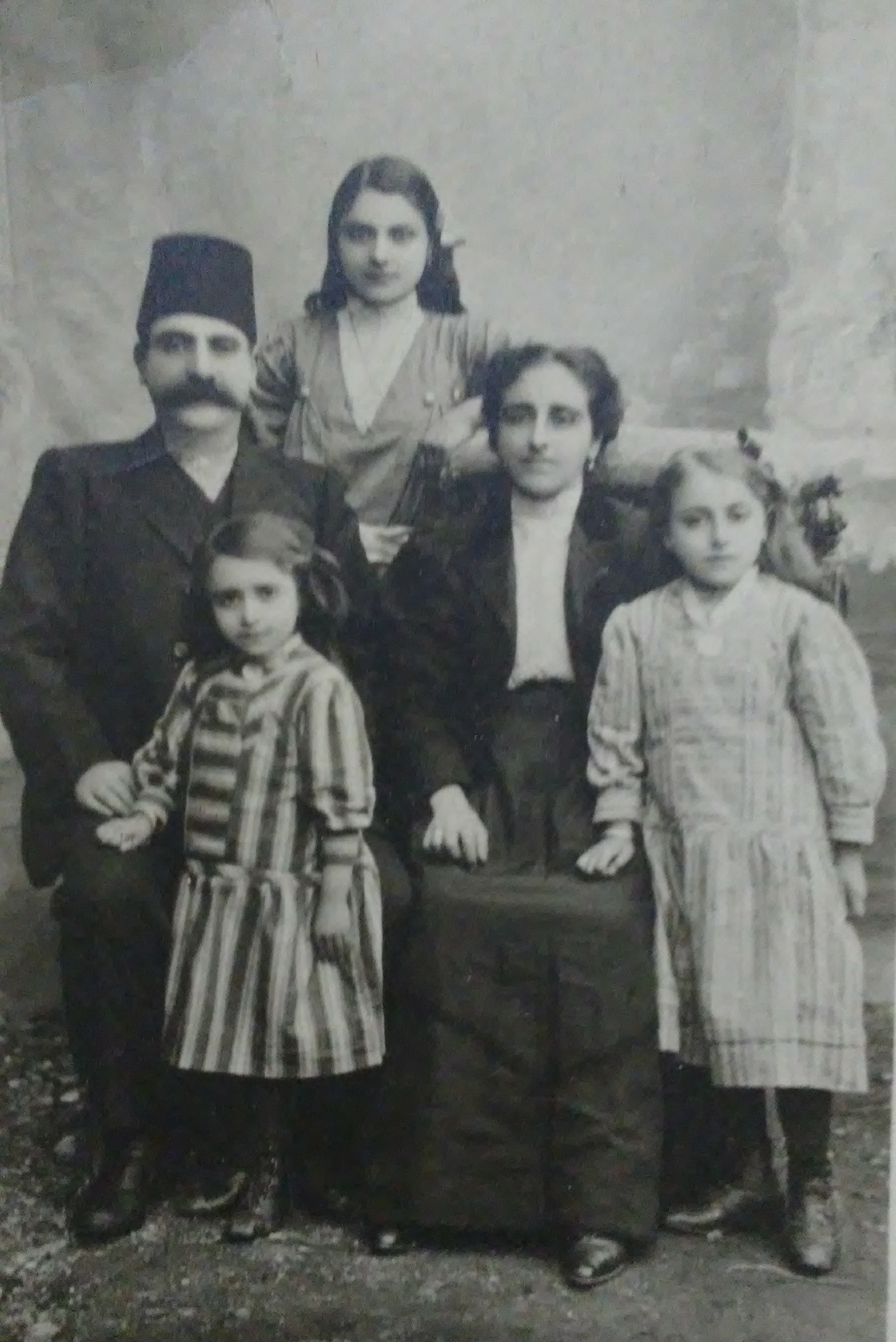
The Ashjians, a family deported to Deir ez-Zor and killed in 1915 (photo c. 1909)

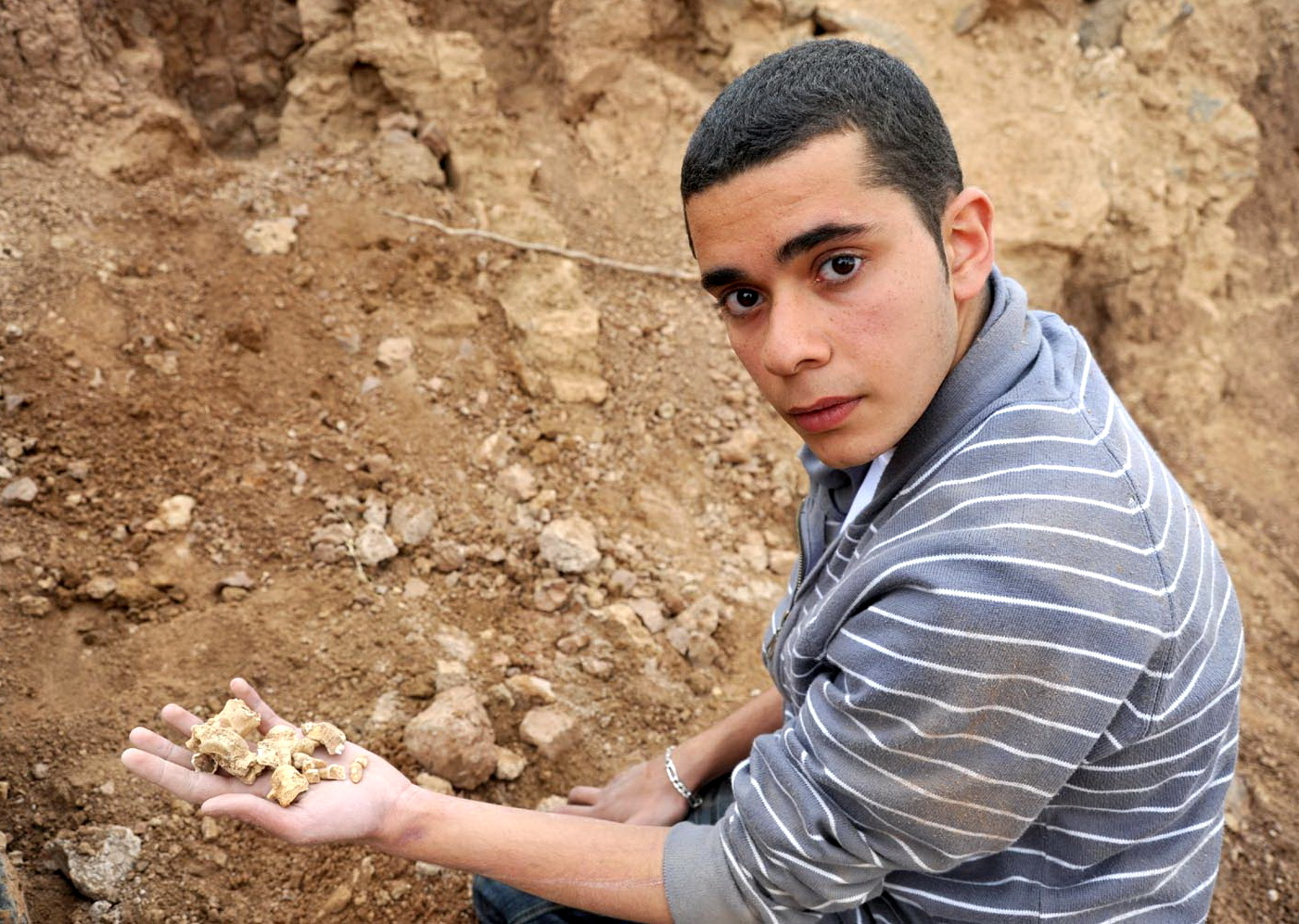
Uncovering the bones of Armenian victims at Deir ez-Zor in 2009.

== See also ==
- List of Armenian genocide memorials
- Armenians in Syria
