= Epic of Ain Albu Gomaa =

Military operation by revolutionary groups during the Great Syrian Revolution

The epic battle of Ain Albu Gomaa
- Part of Great Syrian Revolt
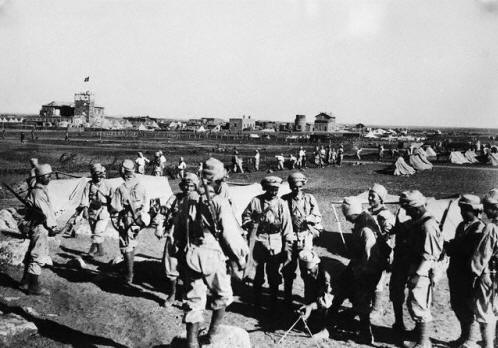
Date	3 June 1925
Location	Deir ez-Zor, Mandatory Syria
Result	The execution of 13 revolutionaries and exile of the family of Ayyash ِAl-Haj to Jableh (Mandatory Syria)

Belligerents
France: Syria; Lebanon	Syrian revolutionaries

The epic battle of Ain Albu Gomaa (Arabic: ملحمة عين البو جمعة) was a military operation carried out by revolutionary groups in the city of Deir Ezzor in early June 1925 against the French forces during the Great Syrian Revolution.

== Deir Ezzor within the Great Syrian Revolution ==
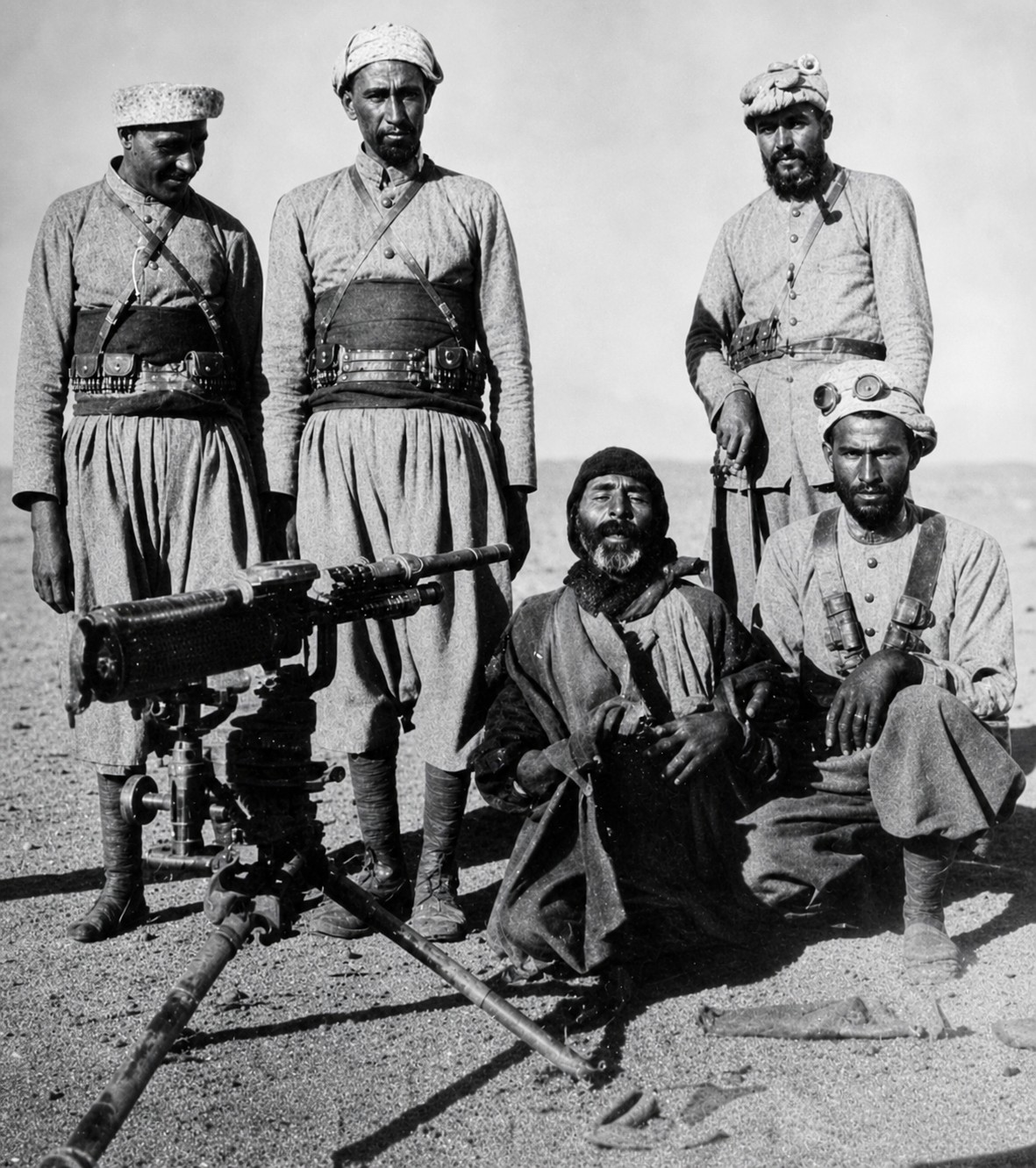
Hassan Al-Abed Al-Salamah, the moment of his execution by the French occupation

Leader Ayyash Al-haj

There were contacts between the leaders of the Great Syrian Revolution and some patriots of Syrian east area as Mohammed ِAl-Ayyash, who met in Damascus with Dr. Abdul Rahman Shahbandar, leader of the People's Party, and discussed with him the issue of extending the revolution to the Euphrates region and opened a front against the French to disperse their forces and ease the pressure on the rebels of Ghouta and Jabal al-Arab, after returned Al-Ayyash from Damascus he started to arouse the enthusiasm of the people of Deir Ezzor and invite them to fight, and agreed with his brother Mahmoud to go to the villages of the Albu Saraya clan that living west of Deir ez-Zor and which have a strong friendship with his father Ayyash Al-Haj, to form revolutionary groups with them to strike the French forces.

Al-Ayyash managed to form a revolutionary group of thirteen armed men who were ready to take any military action against the French forces, They are:

1. Mahmoud Al-Ayyash
2. Hakami Al-Abed Al-Salameh (Al-Shumaitiya Village).
3. Aziz Al-Ali Al-Salamah (Al-Shumaitiya Village).
4. Haji Ali Al-Abed Al-Salama (Al-Shumaitiya Village).
5. Hassan Al-Abed Al-Salamah (Al-Shumaitiya Village).
6. Hamza Al-Abed Al-Salama (Al-Shumaitiya Village).
7. Aslibi Masoud Al-Abdul Jalil (Al-Shumaitiya Village).
8. Khaleef Al-Hassan Al-Muhammad (Al-Kuraitia Village).
9. Lions of Hamdan (Al-Kuraitia Village).
10. Ahmed Al-Hassan (Al-Kuraitia Village).
11. Hameed Al-Sultan (Al-Kuraitia Village).
12. Abdullah Al-Khalaf Ibrahim (Deir Ezzor city).
13. Hamad Bin Rdaini - Al-Baggara tribe.

Some people worked with the French at translation centers and others. Still, they were at the service of the revolutionaries which They were bringing news to Mohammed ِAl-Ayyash about the situation and movements of the French and their activities and the timing of their military operations and Al-Ayyash guides the revolutionaries to strike the French forces.

== The operation ==
French newspaper article linking the killing of the two French officers, Vannières and Wysocki, near Deir ez-Zor in 1925 to Mohammed Al-Ayyash, and referring to his coordination with Dr. Abd al-Rahman Shahbandar and the People's Party in Damascus. Journal des Débats politiques et littéraires, 10 November 1925, p. 2. View article.

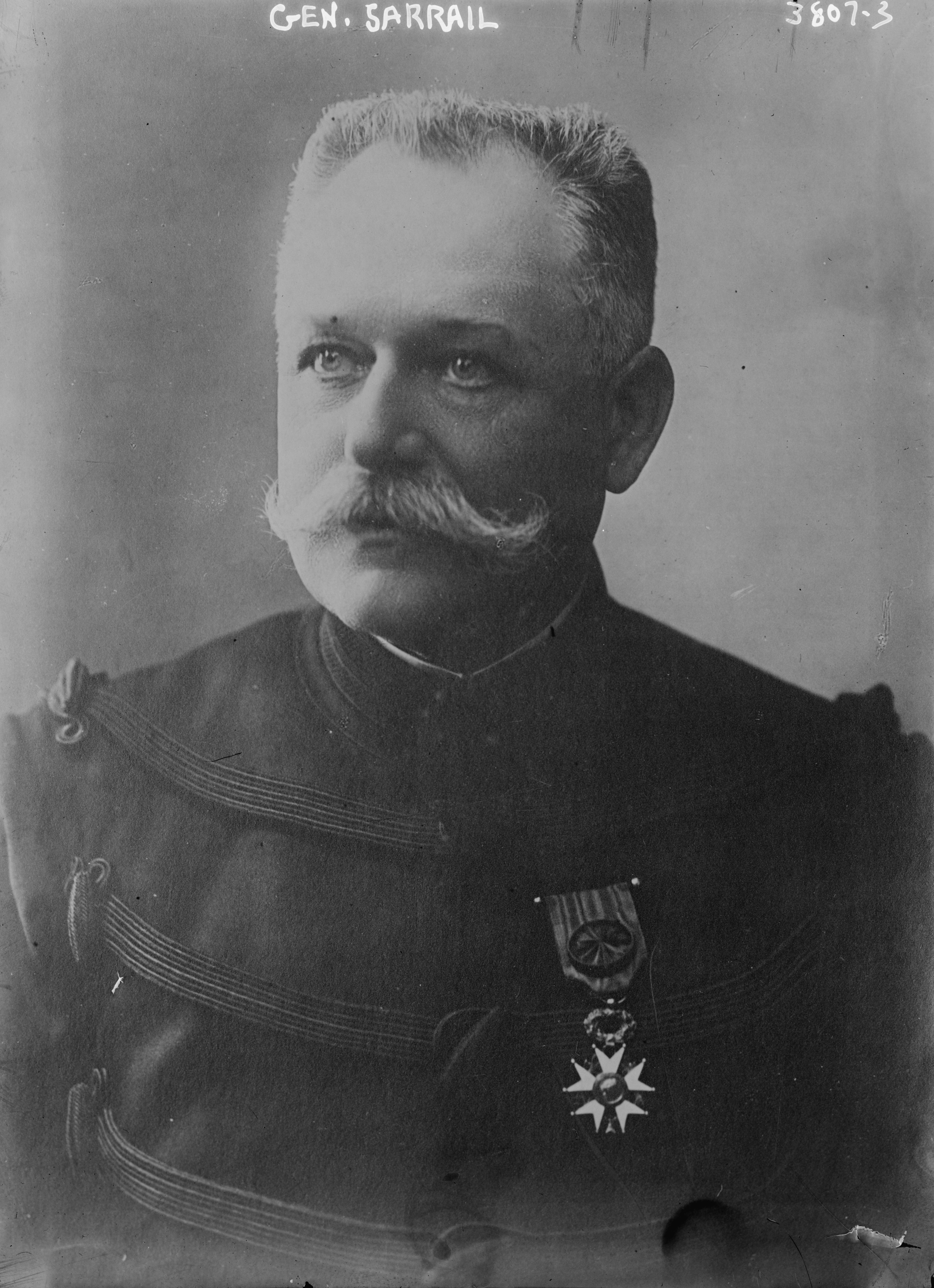
French General Maurice Sarrail, The High Commissioner of the French Mandate of Syria

In early June 1925, the translators informed Mohammed ِbey Al-Ayyash that a military vehicle carrying four French officers who had come from France to inspect the French military construction departments in Mandatory Syria and Greater Lebanon, accompanied by their French driver, would leave Deir Ezzor on its way to Aleppo. He instructed his brother Mahmoud to set up an ambush in the area of Ain Albu Gomaa on the road to Deir Ezzor Al-Raqqa, where the highway runs through very deep valley and has a narrow stone bridge.

If each of the criminals, who committed this terrible offense deserve dying once, the gang leader Mohammed ِAl-Ayyash is deserve hanging twice.

— Officer Bono 1925.

When the military vehicle arrived, the revolutionaries attacked and arrested the officers and took them with their car after they took their weapons to a desert called "Al-Aksiyya", and threw them with their driver in one of the abandoned wells where they died.

The French were mad for losing contact with their officers, and began an extensive campaign included planes to search for them. When they found their bodies and inquired from the informants about the names of the revolutionaries, they sent a sizeable military force equipped with heavy guns and planes to attack Albu Saraya clan and blockade it.

French planes began bombing the villages of the clan, it was a horrific and devastating bombardment where the houses destroyed on the heads of children and women and killed the livestock and burned farms and crops, Some civilians were killed and among them were "Hanash Al-Mousa Al-Ani," "Ali Al-Najras," and a woman who was pregnant. Many were wounded by bullets and shrapnel from planes bombs, All of this was to pressure on the people to surrender the revolutionaries.

When the French is convinced that the bombing did not work, they resorted to a despicable means where they threatened to arrest the women of the revolutionaries, their mothers and sisters until the revolutionaries surrender themselves to the French, when the news arrived at the revolutionaries, they emerged from their hideouts and surrendered themselves to avoid arresting their women.

== The trial of revolutionaries ==
Revolutionaries were tried in Aleppo, where The family of Ayyash Al-Haj appointed lawyer Fathallah Al-Saqqal to defend her, The court heard (officer Bono) head of the French intelligence in Deir Ezzor, who said: If each of the criminals, who committed this terrible offense deserve dying once, the gang leader Mohammed Al-Ayyash is deserve hanging twice.

The French High Commissioner in Beirut, Maurice Sarrail, issued Decision No. 49S / 5 in August 1925, which ordered the exile of all members of the Ayyash Al-Haj family to the city of Jableh, Mahmoud ِAl-Ayyash and 12 of his companions were sentenced to death. The execution was carried out by firing squad on 15 September 1925 in the city of Aleppo. Mohammed ِAl-Ayyash was sentenced to 20 years imprisonment on the island of Arwad in Tartous city.

== See also ==
- Great Syrian Revolt
- Ayyash Al-Haj
- Sultan Al-Atrash
- Ibrahim Hananu
- Yusuf al-'Azma
- Abd Al-Rahman Shahbandar
- Saleh Al-Ali
- Fawzi al-Qawuqji
- Hasan al-Kharrat
- Mandate for Syria and the Lebanon
- Henri Gouraud
- Maurice Sarrail
- Syria
- Deir ez-Zor
- Adham Khanjar
- Fadel Al-Aboud
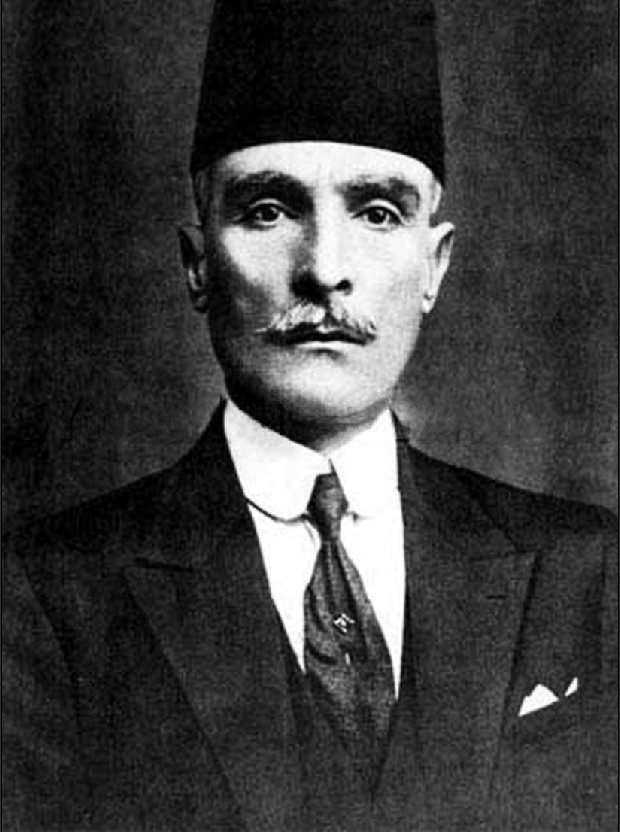
Ibrahim Hananu

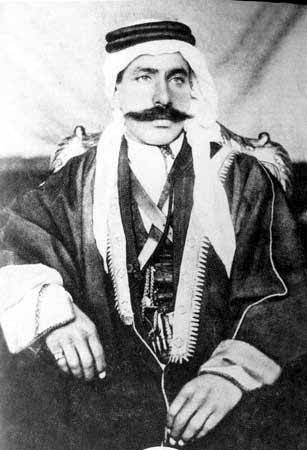
Sultan Al-Atrash

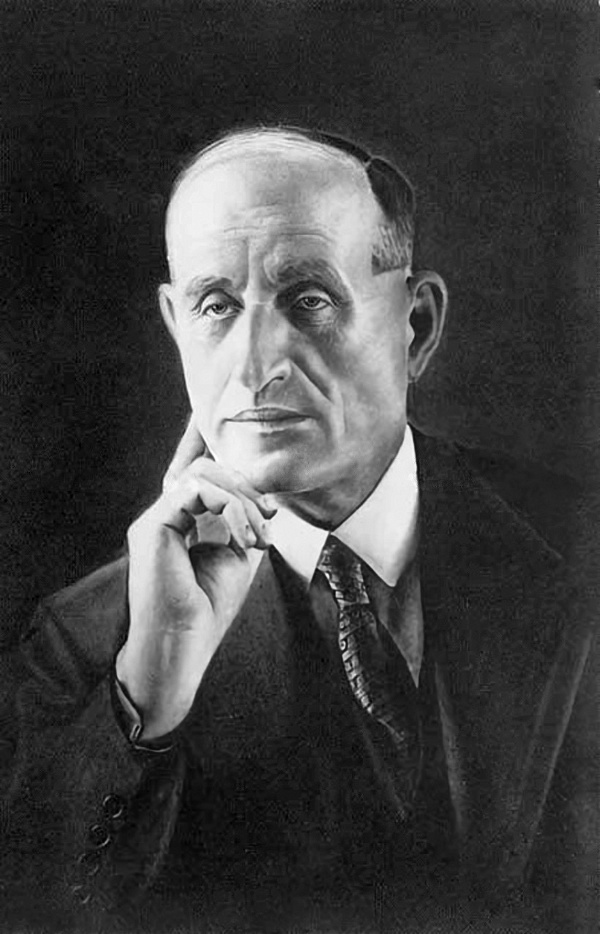
Abd Al-Rahman Shahbandar

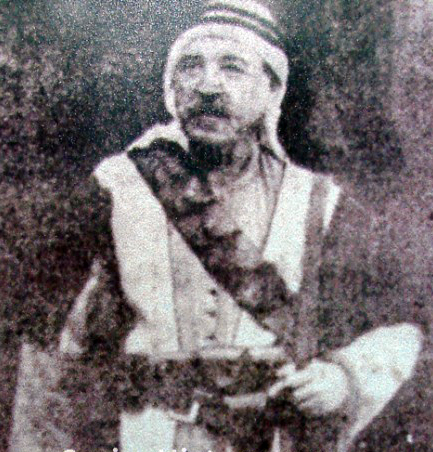
Saleh Al-Ali

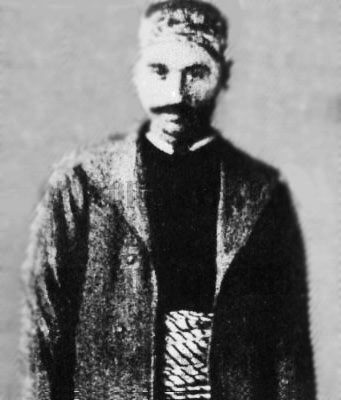
Hasan al-Kharrat

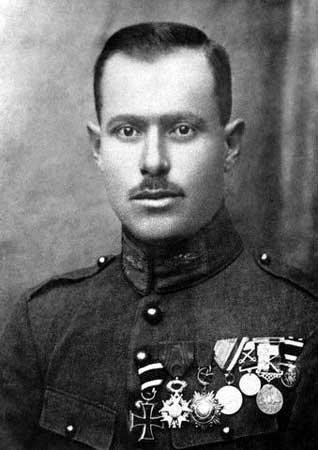
Fawzi al-Qawuqji
