= A4 motorway (Luxembourg) =

Highway in Luxembourg

Autoroute 4
- Autobunn 4
- Autoroute d'Esch-sur-Alzette
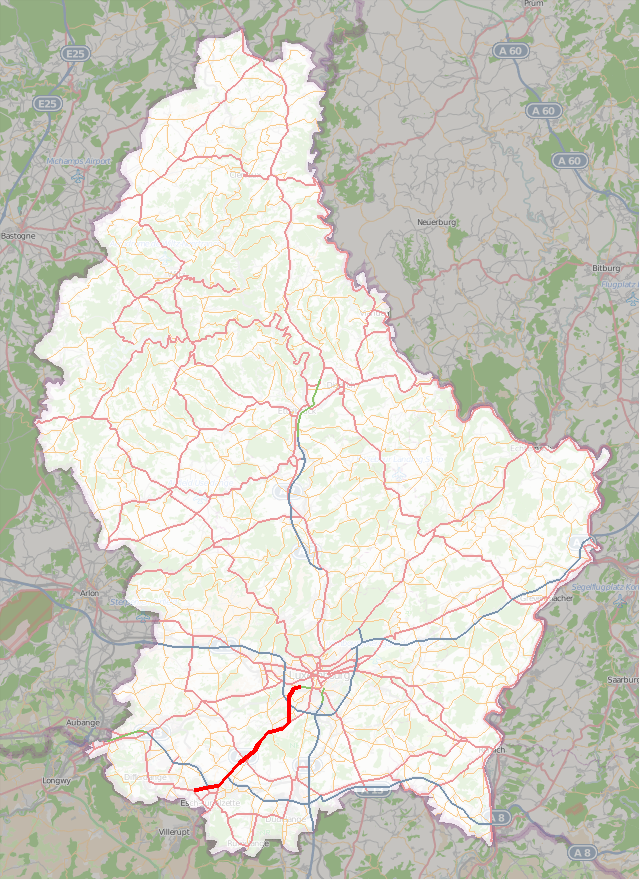

Route information
- Length: 16.302 km (10.130 mi)
- Existed: 1969–present
- History: Completed in 1992

Major junctions
- North end: Luxembourg City
- Croix de Cessange; Leudelange; Pontpierre
- South end: Esch-sur-Alzette

Location
- Country: Luxembourg

Highway system
- Motorways in Luxembourg

The Autoroute 4, abbreviated to A4 or otherwise known as the Esch-sur-Alzette motorway (French: Autoroute de Esch-sur-Alzette, Luxembourgish: Escher Autobunn, German: Escher Autobahn), is a motorway in southern Luxembourg. It is 16.302 kilometres (10.130 mi) long and connects Luxembourg City to Esch-sur-Alzette.

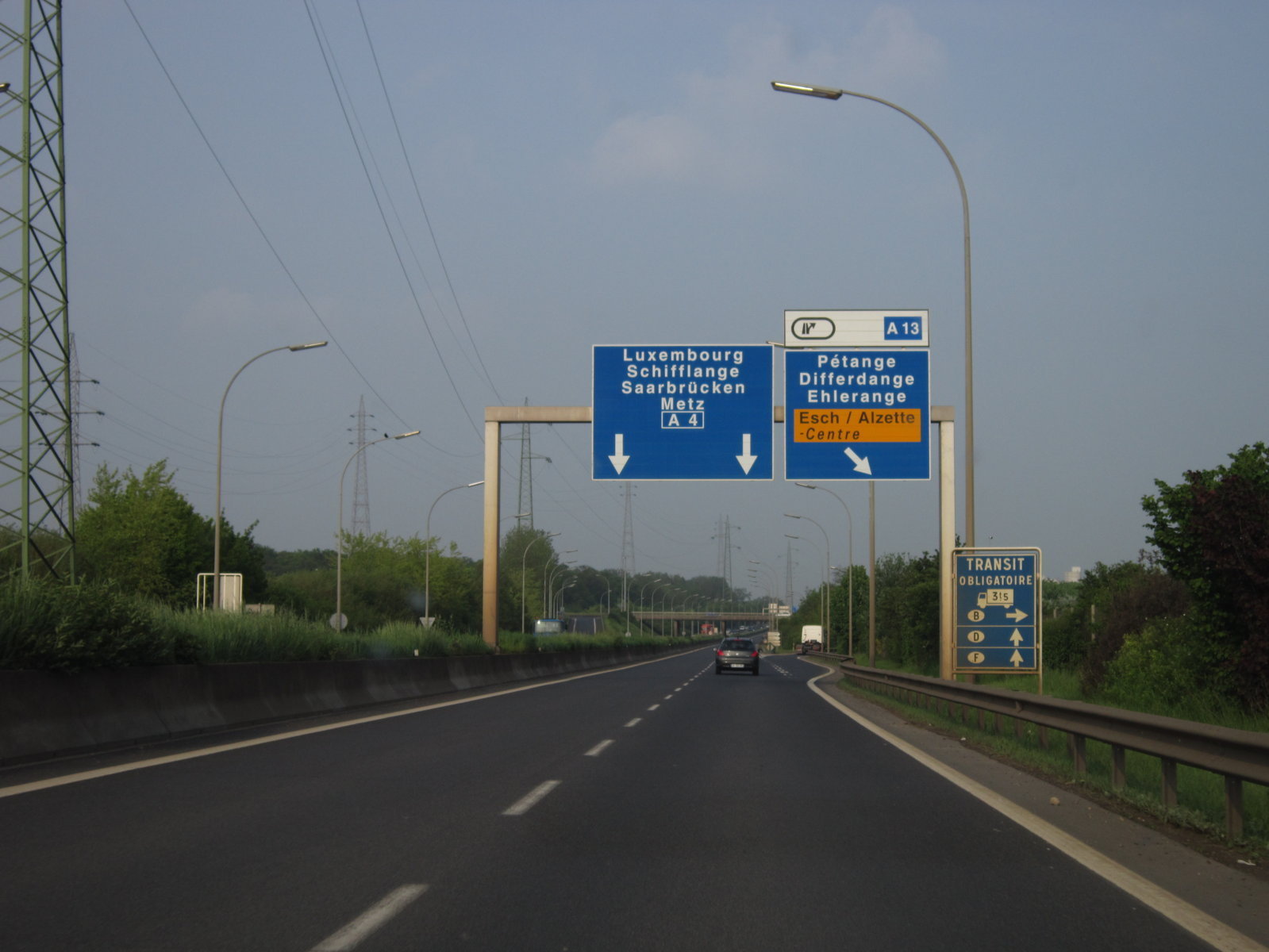

== Overview ==
The A4 was opened in six separate sections:

- 1969: Pontpierre – Lallange
- 1972: Leudelange-Nord – Leudelange-Sud
- 1974: Merl – Leudelange-Nord
- 1976: Leudelange-Sud – Pontpierre
- 1988: Lallange – Lankelz
- 1992: Lankelz – Raemerech

== Route ==
Junctions and structures
| | Luxembourg City |
| | Croix de Cessange | A 6 |
| (J1) | Leudelange (North) | N 4 |
| (J2) | Leudelange (South) | N 4 |
| (J3) | Pontpierre | N 13 |
| / / | Pontpierre services |
| (J4) | Foetz |
| | Esch Junction | A 13 |
| (J5) | Lallange | N 4 |
| | Lankelz Junction | A 13 |
| | Esch-sur-Alzette, Audun-Le-Tiche | N 31 |
