= A13 motorway (Luxembourg) =

Highway in Luxembourg

Autoroute 13
- Autobunn 13
- Liaison avec la Sarre; Collectrice du Sud
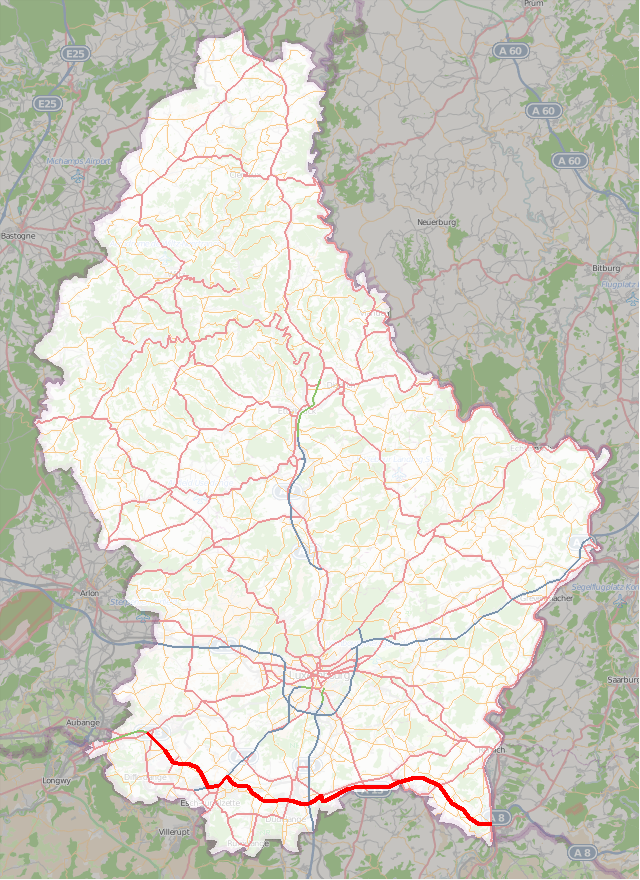

Route information
- Length: 42.310 km (26.290 mi)
- Existed: December 1990–present
- History: Completed on 24 July 2003

Major junctions
- West end: Pétange
- Sanem; Differdange; Schifflange; Frisange; Mondorf-les-Bains; Schengen
- East end: (Germany) Bundesautobahn 8 for Saarlouis

Location
- Country: Luxembourg

Highway system
- Motorways in Luxembourg

The Autoroute 13, abbreviated to A13, is a motorway in southern Luxembourg. It is 42.310 kilometres (26.290 mi) long and connects Pétange to Schengen, via all the largest towns in the Red Lands. At Schengen, it reaches the German border, whereupon it meets the A8, which crosses southern Germany.

== Overview ==
For its western 20.4 kilometres, until it reaches Lankelz, it is known as the South collector road (French: Collectrice du Sud). For its eastern 21.9 kilometres, it is known as the Connection with the Saar (French: Liaison avec la Sarre), or Saar Autobahn (Luxembourgish: Saarautobunn).

In all, the A13 was opened in eight separate sections:

- December 1990: Bascharage - Sanem
- 1993: Pétange - Bascharage
- October 1993: Kayl - Burange
- January 1994: Schifflange - Kayl
- 3 June 1994: Sanem - Lankelz
- 3 June 1994: Esch-sur-Alzette - Schifflange
- July 1995: Rodange - Pétange
- 24 July 2003: Hellange - Schengen

== Route ==
Junctions and structures
	Biff roundabout	N 5 / N 31
(J1)	Bascharage	N 31
(J2)	Sanem
(J3)	Differdange
	Aessen Tunnel
	Ehlerange Tunnel
(J4)	Ehlerange
	Lankelz Junction	A 4
(J5)	Lallange	N 4
	Esch Junction	A 4
(J6)	Schifflange
(J7)	Kayl
(J8)	Burange	N 31
	Croix de Bettembourg	A 3
(J9)	Hellange	N 13
	Frisange Tunnel
(J10)	Frisange	N 3
(J11)	Altwies	N 16
	Altwies Viaduct
	Mondorf-les-Bains Tunnel
(J12)	Mondorf-les-Bains	N 16
	Markusbierg Tunnel
(J13)	Schengen	N 10
	Schengen Viaduct
(Germany)	Border with Germany	A 8
