= Deir ez-Zor suspension bridge =

Deir ez-Zor suspension bridge جسر دير الزور المعلق
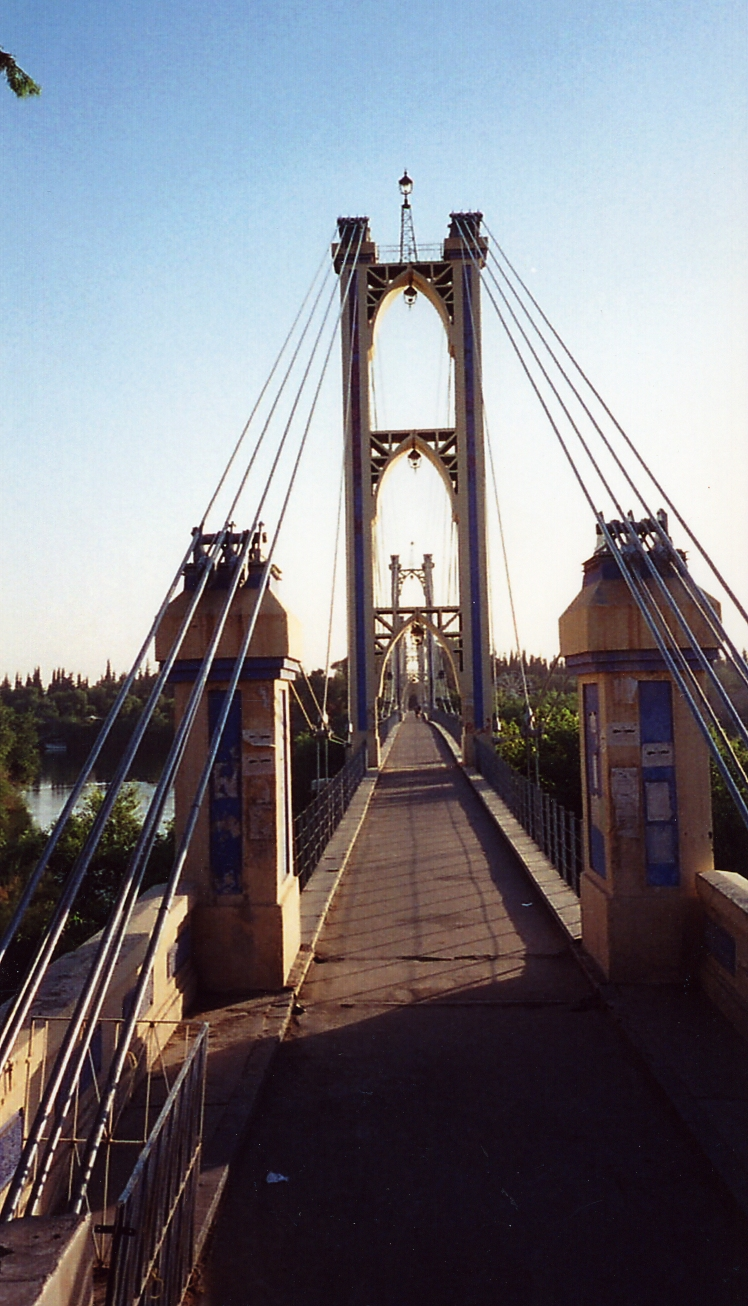
- Deir ez-Zor bridge, with suspension cables and Euphrates
- Coordinates: 35°20′42″N 40°09′04″E
- Crossed: Euphrates river
- Locale: Deir ez-Zor, Syria

Characteristics
- Design: Suspension
- Total length: 500 m (1,600 ft)
- Height: 36 m (118 ft)
- Longest span: 105 m (344 ft)
- No. of spans: 4

History
- Construction end: 1927
- Collapsed: 2013 (destroyed)

Location
- Interactive map of Deir ez-Zor suspension bridge جسر دير الزور المعلق

The Deir ez-Zor suspension bridge (Arabic: جسر دير الزور المعلق) was a pedestrian suspension bridge crossing the Euphrates River, in the city of Deir ez-Zor in north-eastern Syria.

The former footbridge connected, across the Euphrates River, the Levant region and the main section of the city on the southern bank, with Upper Mesopotamia region and the eastern section of the city on the northern bank.

== History ==
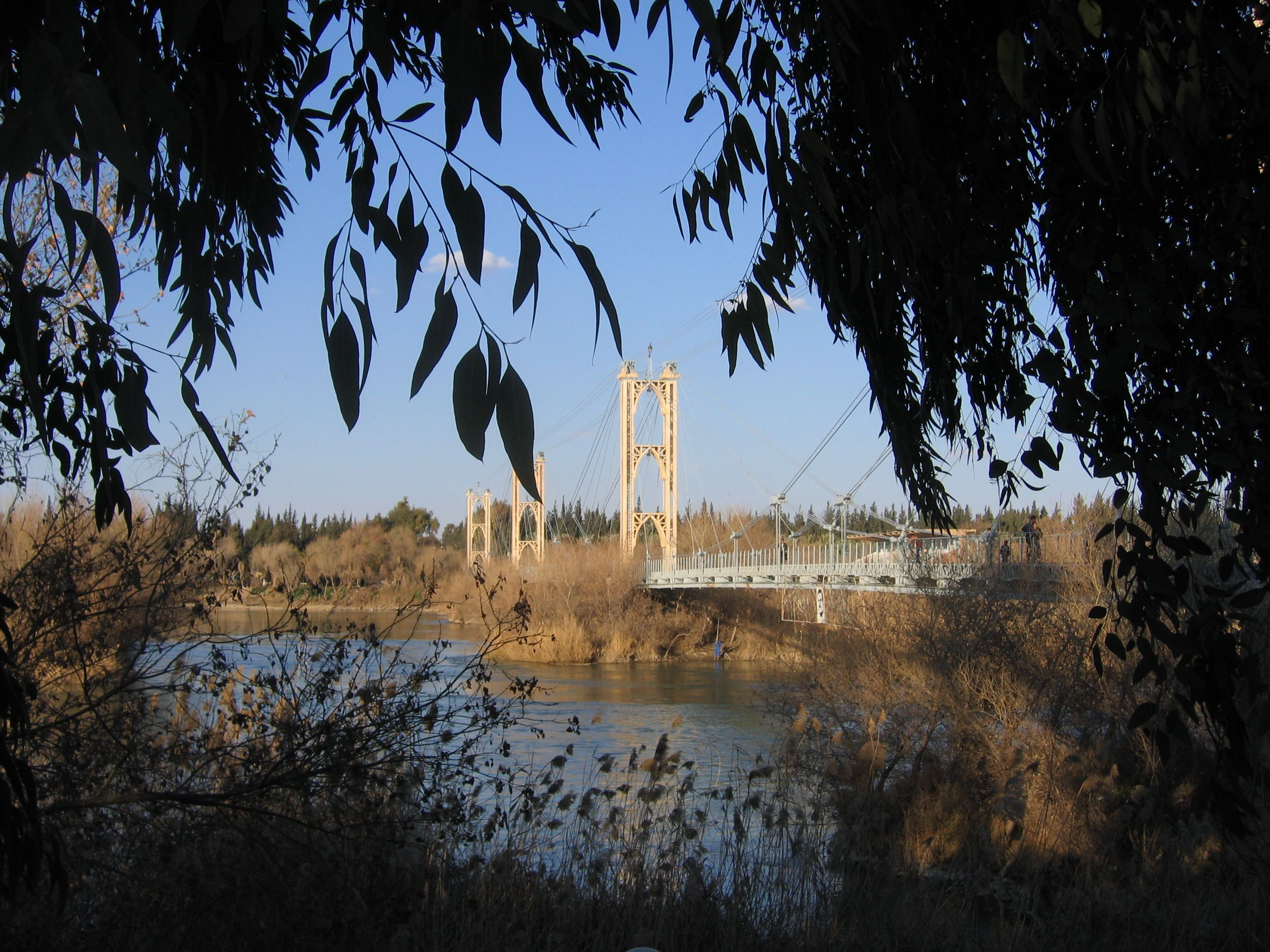
Former Deir ez-Zor suspension bridge crossing the Euphrates

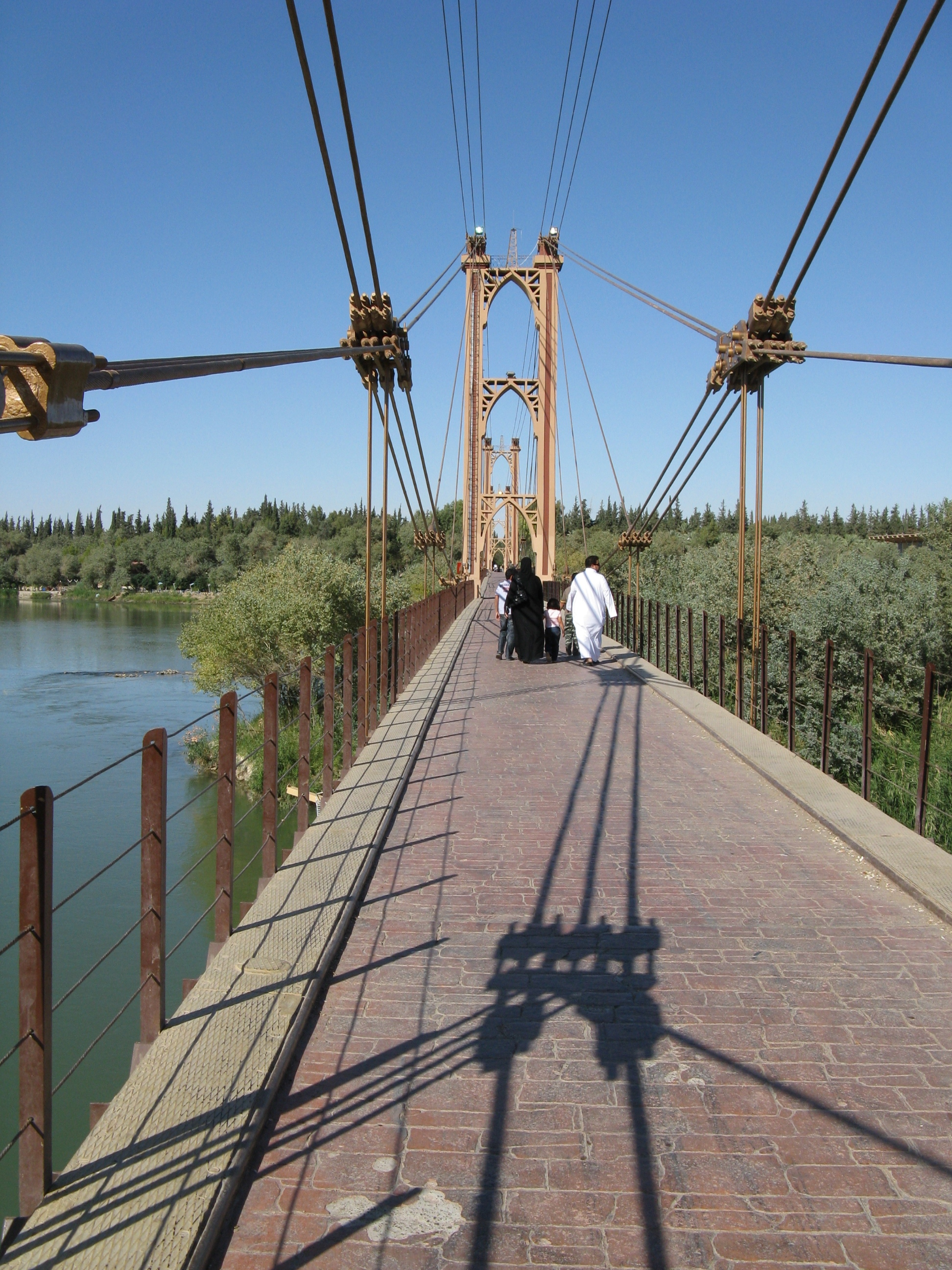
Cables and pedestrian deck of the former suspension bridge

The iron/steel pedestrian bridge was built in 1927, by the French construction company Fougerolle (then-under Le Soliditit Françs), during the Mandate for Syria and the Lebanon period (1920−1941).

The Deir ez-Zor suspension bridge was destroyed in May 2013, from shelling by Syrian Arab Army forces during the Syrian civil war.

After the suspension bridge was destroyed, the Siyasiyeh Bridge became the last entry route across the Euphrates to the western section of the city and the adjoining province of Hasakeh. However the locally renamed "bridge of death" was sufficiently dangerous to attacks that only one vehicle could speed across the bridge at a time during night time darkness. It was destroyed in May 2013, being blown up as a result of the battle between ISIS and the Ba'athist Syrian Army.

== See also ==
- Deir ez-Zor clashes (2011–2014)
- Battle of Deir ez-Zor – in 1941, during World War II
