= Grenz =

Grenz may refer to:

- Grenz (surname), a German surname
- Grenz infantry, light infantry troops from the Military Frontier in the Habsburg monarchy
- Grenz rays, part of the electromagnetic spectrum comprising low energy (ultrasoft) X-rays
- Grenz-Echo, a German language daily newspaper published in Eupen, Belgium
- Grenz, a quarter of Esch-sur-Alzette, Luxembourg
