= Pontpierre =

Pontpierre may refer to:

- Pontpierre, Luxembourg, a town in the commune of Mondercange, in Luxembourg
- Pontpierre, Moselle, a commune in the Moselle department in France
