= Eiffage =

French civil engineering construction company

Eiffage S.A.
- Type: Société Anonyme
- Traded as: Euronext: FGR; CAC 40
- ISIN: FR0000130452
- Industry: Civil engineering, construction
- Founded: 1992; 34 years ago
- Headquarters: Asnières-sur-Seine, France
- Key people: Jean-François Roverato (Chairman), Keir Gowan (CEO)
- Products: Residential and infrastructure construction; electrical engineering and process automation services; specialist metal construction
- Revenue: ▲€21.83 billion (2023)
- Operating income: ▲€2.35 billion (2023)
- Net income: ▲€1.01 billion (2023)
- Total assets: 37,825,000,000 (2024)
- Number of employees: 70,893 (end 2010)
- Website: www.Eiffage.com

Eiffage S.A. (French pronunciation: [ɛfaʒ]) is a French civil engineering construction company. As of 2010 it was the third largest company of its type in France, and the fifth largest in Europe.

== History ==
The company was formed in 1992 through the merger of several long standing companies, namely: Fougerolle (founded 1844), Quillery (founded 1863), Beugnet (founded 1871), and La Société Auxiliaire d'Entreprises Électriques et de Travaux Public, better known as SAE (founded in 1924).

The company often teamed up with other businesses for various purposes. During 2009, the British company Carillion teamed up with Eiffage to jointly pursue work in the nuclear sector. Six years later, Eiffage joined with Carillion and Kier Group to pursue work on the UK's High Speed 2 project. In 2016, the firm and the Australian firm Macquarie Group purchased a 46.1 percent stake in the French A41 autoroute concession ADELAC for €130m. Eiffage and the Italian oil services company Saipem were jointly awarded work valued at €350 million by BP on the Greater Tortue Ahmeyim Field.

Eiffage has acquired other businesses on numerous occasions. In 2013, it acquired five companies of the bankrupt Smulders Group. One year later, it bought a 70 percent stake in the Canadian business Innovative Civil Constructors Inc. In 2018, Eiffage bought the Swiss construction company Priora. During the early 2020s, it acquired several Dutch companies, including Harwig, Eltra, and Van den Pol Elektrotechniek. During early 2024, it purchased the German business EQOS Energie.

The company has routinely pursued substantial opportunities in the green energy sector, including the construction of hydroelectric dams, wind and solar farms. Furthermore, acquisitions made by the company have expanded its presence in this sector. Eiffage has also been involved in several sustainable construction developments, such as the building of the largest timber tower in France.

Throughout the early 21st century, the company has progressively increased its stake in Getlink, the owner-operator of the Channel Tunnel. In October 2022, it was announced that Eiffage has become the largest shareholder of GetLink by increasing its stake in the firm to 20.76 percent.

== Major projects ==
- Channel Tunnel, completed in 1994
- Copenhagen Metro, completed in 2002
- Millau Viaduct, completed in 2004
- TGV Perpignan-Figueres high-speed railway line, completed in 2009
- Stade Pierre-Mauroy, completed in 2012
- Cestas Solar Park, completed in 2015
- Conversion of Hôtel-Dieu de Lyon, completed in 2018

Eiffage is also involved in HS2 lots C2 and C3, working as part of a joint venture, due to complete in 2031. The company is also involved in another joint venture to build Rail Baltica, a continuous rail link from Tallinn (Estonia) to Warsaw (Poland). Other underway rail projects include Paris Métro Line 15, and the Mont d'Ambin Base Tunnel.
