= Grenz (surname) =

Grenz is a German surname. Notable people with the surname include:

- Dmitri Grenz (born 1996), Kazakhstani ice hockey centre
- Stanley James Grenz (1950–2005), American Christian theologian and ethicist in the Baptist tradition.

== See also ==
- Grenz (disambiguation)
