= EQOS Energie =

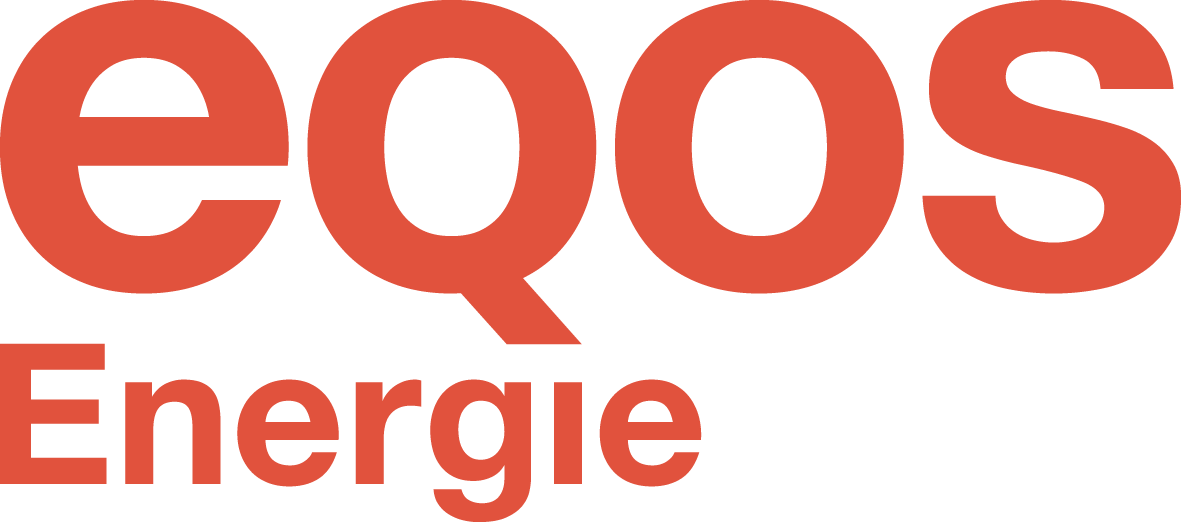
- Type: S.à r.l.
- Industry: Industrial Networks; Telecommunication; Traffic management Construction equipment Electrical engineering
- Founded: 1920
- Headquarters: Foetz, Luxembourg
- Key people: Eric Mendel (CEO); Dr. Helmut Steurer (CFO)
- Revenue: 310 Million Euros
- Number of employees: c. 2,200

EQOS Energie is a corporate group, based in Foetz, Luxembourg. The company has more than 30 branches in eight countries. EQOS Energie specialises in railway and energy technology, overhead lines, communication technology and technical building services.

Until August 2014, the company operated under the name ALPINE-ENERGIE. EQOS is an acronym that stands for Excellent Quality Of Services, and represents the brand promise. EQOS Energie is owned by the European investment company Triton.

== History ==
Founded as "ENERGIE-Gesellschaft für elektrische und industrielle Unternehmungen mbH" in Stuttgart by Wilhelm Blättchen in 1920, EQOS Energie has a nearly hundred-year-old company history. Back then, the business segment was constituted by electrical and industrial enterprises. In 1978, the subsidiary "ENERGIE Lignes Hautes Tension" was founded in Luxembourg. 15 years later, the first working group (ARGE) combined their operations with the Austrian “ALPINE Bau GmbH" in a joint venture. In connection with ARGE, a 380-kV forwarding line was set up for the Austrian composite company as were the first steel towers for mobile radio networks. This resulted in the foundation of "ALPINE-ENERGIE Gesellschaft für elektrische und industrielle Unternehmungen GmbH", which is headquartered in Linz, Austria. Due to the foundation of "ENERGIE-Gesellschaft für Leitungsbau und Kommunikationstechnik AG" in Bern, the company expanded its business into Switzerland. Entry into the rail sector was marked by "ALPINE ENERGIE’s" launch in the catenary building sector at the Austrian St. Valentin main railway station in 1999. As a result, the catenary lines there were modernised. Three years later, the ALPINE Group took over the shares owned by Blättchen. While founding the "ALPINE-ENERGIE Holding AG" and "ALPINE-ENERGIE Deutschland GmbH", the business expanded and the company grew quickly.

In 2006, the Spanish building group Fomento de Construcciones y Contratas (FCC) became majority shareholder of the ALPINE Group. In the same year, "SAG Kommunikationstechnik" was taken over. Through its acquisition of "SAG Kommunikationstechnik", the company extended its business in Switzerland and Austria. Between 2009 and 2011, "ALPINE-ENERGIE" companies were founded in Poland, the Czech Republic and Hungary.

In 2013, the FCC assumed ownership of ALPINE-ENERGIE, which became a subsidiary of FCC. Subsequently, the company was taken over by Triton Fonds in 2014. Since then, the long-established group member has conducted its business under the name of EQOS Energie. Following the turnaround, as one of the industry's foremost suppliers, the company realigned its business model in 2015 to address growing market requirements. In a management buy-out, EQOS Energie retired in 2016 from the Swiss market and focused in all service areas on its eight core markets: Germany, Austria, Luxembourg, France, Belgium, Poland, the Czech Republic and Hungary.

== Business Sector ==
EQOS Energie trades in five business sectors: railway and energy technology, overhead lines, communication technology and technical building services. Its range of activities include consulting, planning and construction as well as maintenance and optimisation. In addition to complete projects the company also offers individual services for various project stages.

Concerning railway technology, EQOS Energie is specialised in the construction of catenary lines, signalling technology and technical equipment in the local and long-distance transport sector. The construction of switchgear and substations is the key expertise of the energy technology division. In the production and manufacturing processes, EQOS Energie plans, delivers, installs and maintains all technical facilities. Also, the company offers in the areas of transport and lighting technology in Austria. Given changes in energy policy, EQOS Energie has taken over new construction and increased high-voltage network construction. As a nationwide full-service provider, EQOS Energie plans, constructs and maintains mobile communications and fixed networks.

EQOS Energie focuses on technical equipment for buildings and the public sector in Poland and the Czech Republic. The spectrum of services extends from acquisition and construction to maintenance, modernisation and repair of commercial real estate and industrial plants.
