= Markusbierg Tunnel =

Coordinates: 49.4789°N 6.3482°E

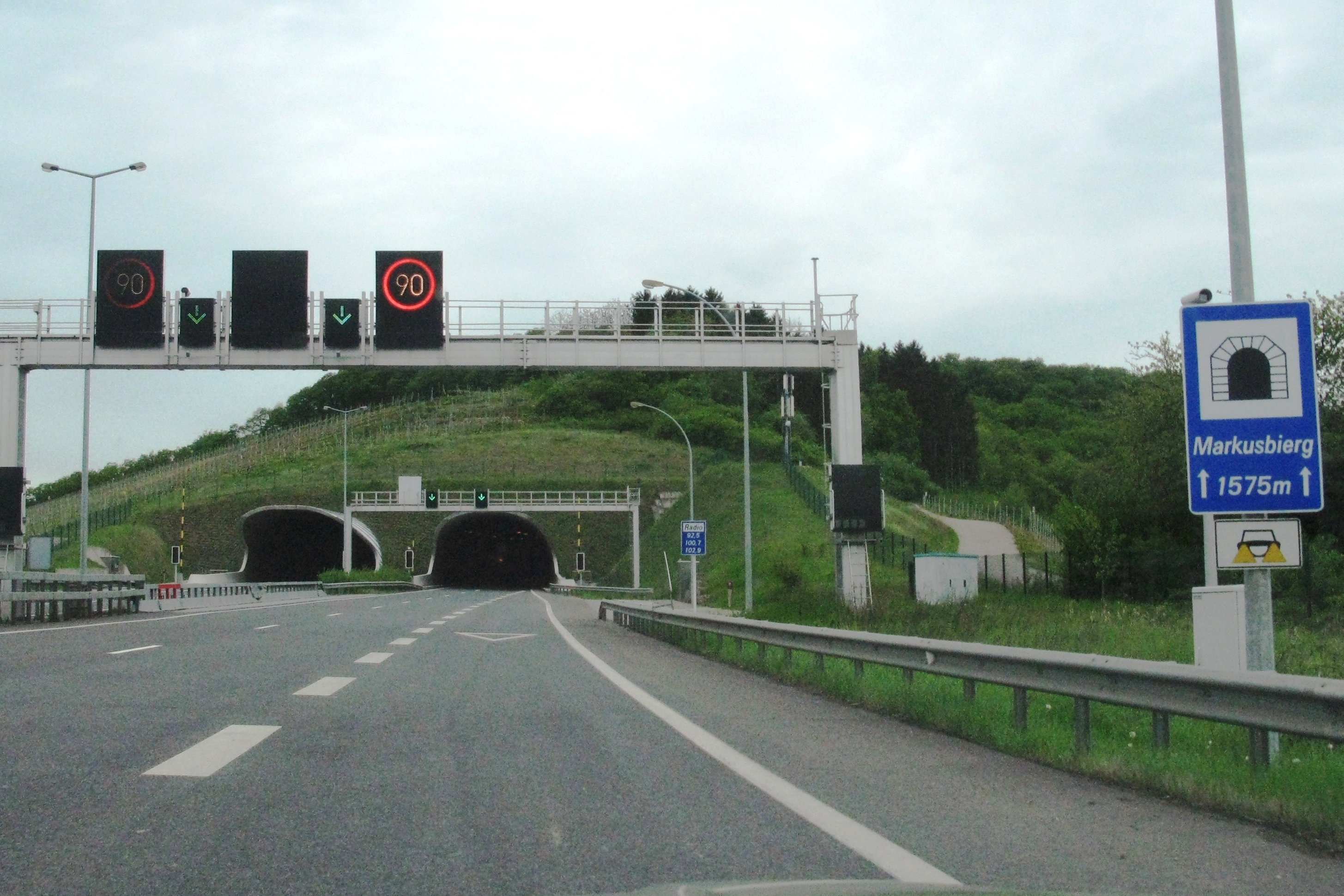
The South entrance

The Markusbierg tunnels are a pair of parallel tunnels, which form the most easterly section of the A13 motorway through Luxembourg, near the town of Schengen. The tunnels are 1575 metres in length, and descend easterly, towards the German border at a 5% gradient. The eastern end of the tunnel runs directly to a viaduct crossing the river Moselle, which forms the border with Germany.

Construction work was initiated on 15 September 1997 and the tunnels opened to public traffic on 24 July 2003, along with the rest of the A13 motorway. Total construction costs were €65m, including €15m for the installation of added security systems.

Each tunnel has regular emergency crossing points into the other, to allow escape in case of emergency. In addition to the normal lighting of the tunnels, and because of their gradient and curve, the road edges (including the kerb) are also fully illuminated, which helps to indicate the tight radius. Support staff are located near the German border.
