= Quarters of Esch-sur-Alzette =

Subdivisions in Esch-sur-Alzette, Luxembourg

Map of the quarters of Esch-sur-Alzette

Quarters (Luxembourgish: Quartierën, French: Quartiers) are the administrative divisions of Esch-sur-Alzette, the second-largest city in Luxembourg.

There are currently eighteen quarters, covering most of the commune of Esch-sur-Alzette. They are:

- Al Esch
- Belval
- Brill
- Bruch
- Dellhéicht
- Fettmeth
- Grenz
- Lalleng
- Lankelz
- Neiduerf
- Park
- Raemerich
- Schlassgoard
- Sommmet
- Uecht
- Universitéit
- Wobrecken
- Zaepert

== See also ==
- Districts of Luxembourg City
