= Frisange =

Frisange Fréiseng (Luxembourgish) Frisingen (German)
- Commune
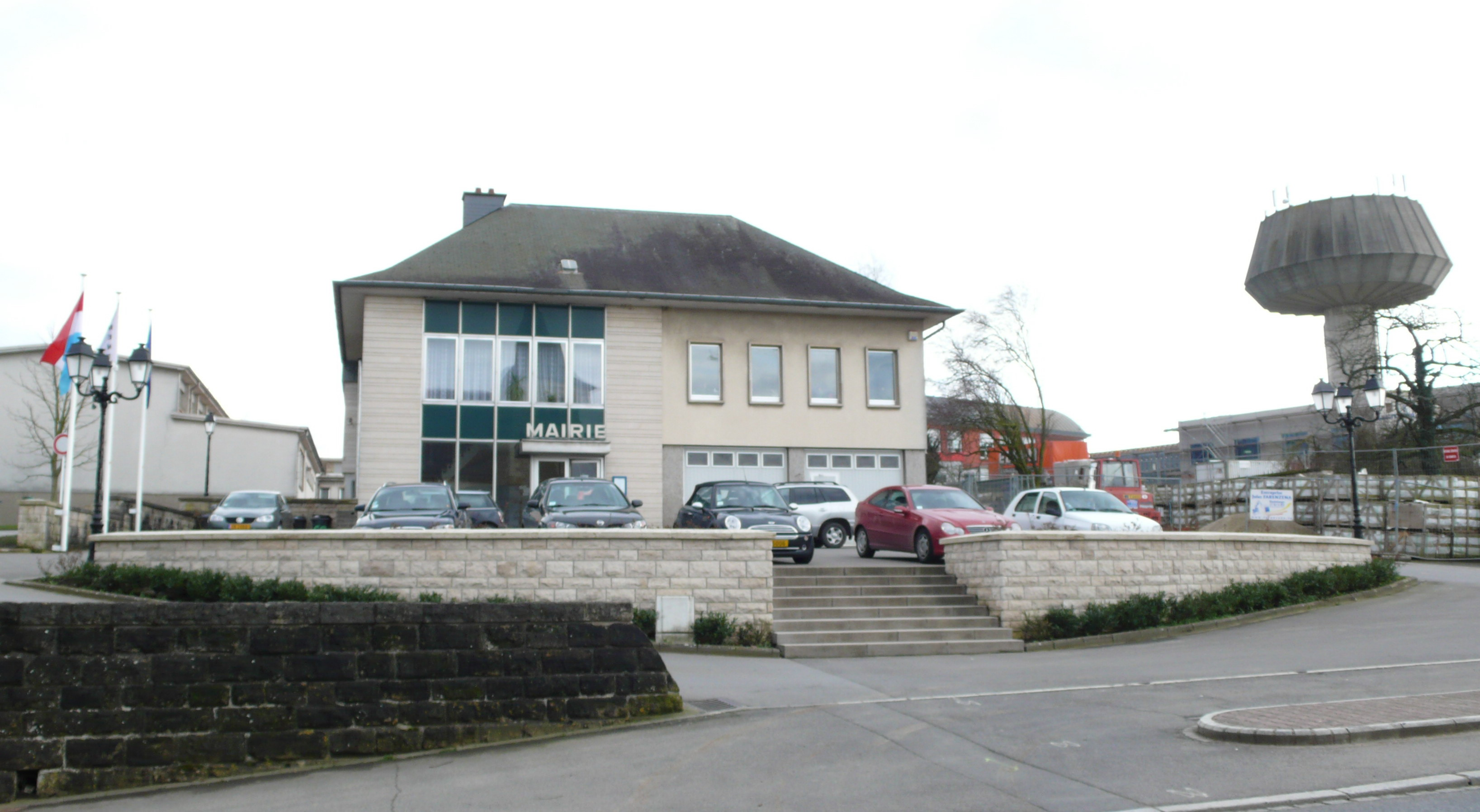
- Town hall

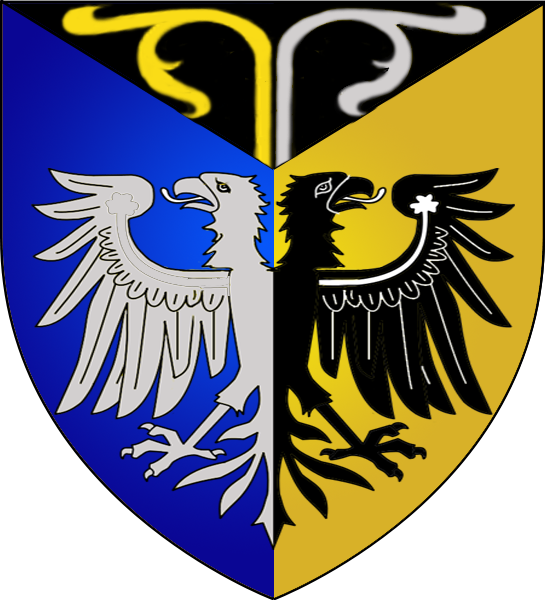
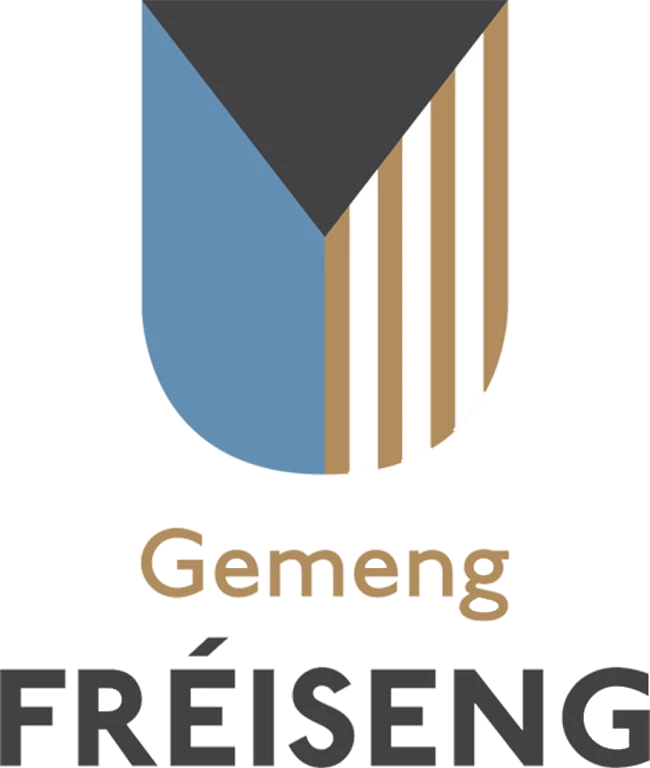
- Coat of arms Brandmark

- Map of Luxembourg with Frisange highlighted in orange, and the canton in dark red
- Coordinates: 49.515°N 6.19167°E
- Country: Luxembourg
- Canton: Esch-sur-Alzette

Government
  - Mayor: Roger Beissel

Area
  - Total: 18.43 km^{2} (7.12 sq mi)
  - Rank: 63rd of 100
- Highest elevation: 293 m (961 ft)
  - Rank: 100th of 100
- Lowest elevation: 224 m (735 ft)
  - Rank: 37th of 100

Population (2026)
  - Total: 5,068
  - Rank: 36th of 100
  - Density: 275.0/km^{2} (712.2/sq mi)
  - Rank: 31st of 100
- Time zone: UTC+1 (CET)
  - Summer (DST): UTC+2 (CEST)
- LAU 2: LU0000205
- Website: frisange.lu

Frisange (French pronunciation: [fʁizɑ̃ʒ]; Luxembourgish: Fréiseng, German: Frisingen [ˈfʁiːzɪŋən]) is a commune and town in southern Luxembourg. It is part of the canton of Esch-sur-Alzette.

As of September 2026, the town of Frisange, which lies in the north of the commune, has a population of 2,378. Other towns within the commune include Aspelt and Hellange.

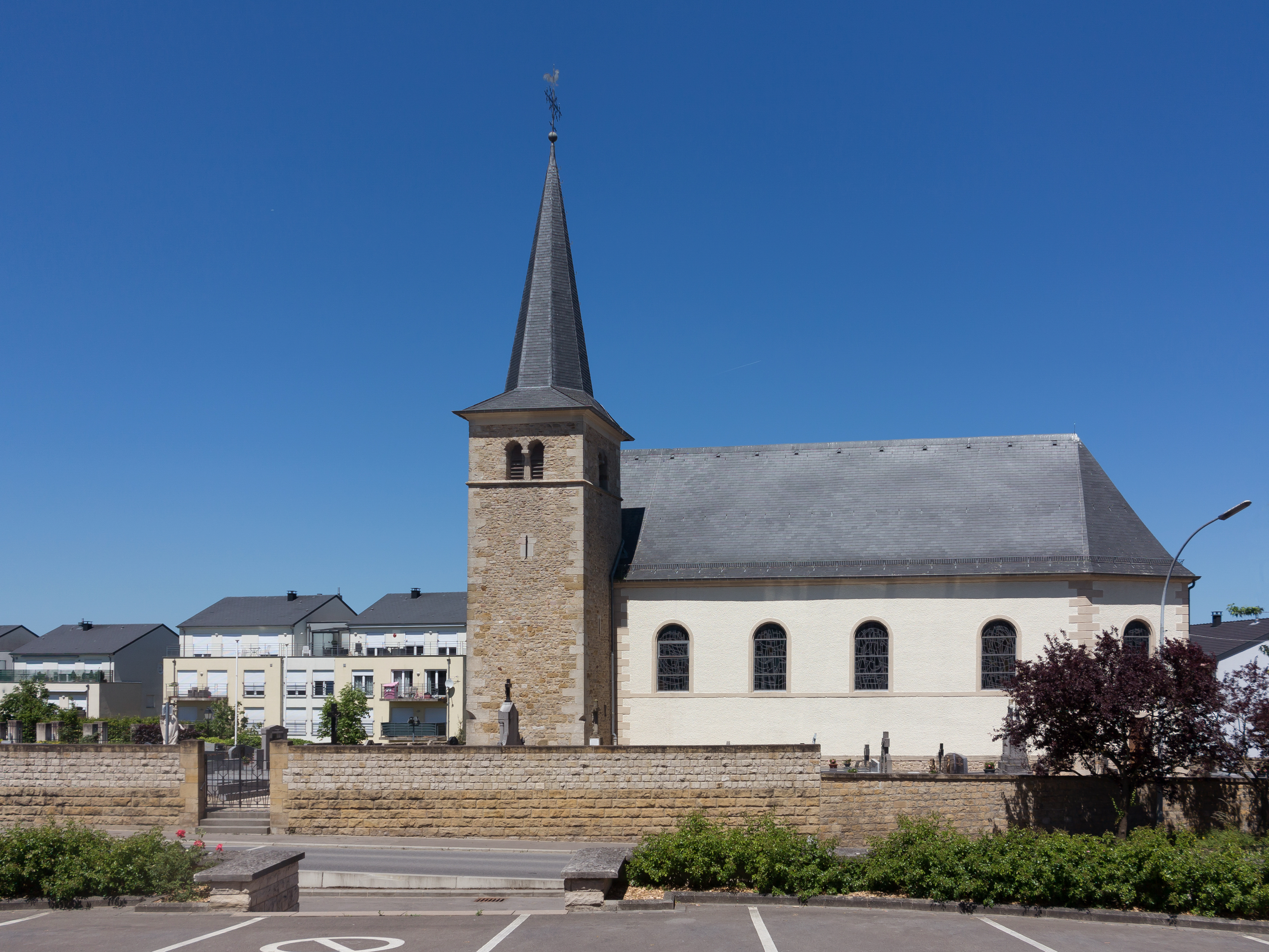
Frisange, church: l'église Saint-Martin

== Population ==
Historical population

Year	Pop.	±%
1821	932	—
1851	1,354	+45.3%
1900	1,161	−14.3%
1910	1,153	−0.7%
1922	1,211	+5.0%
1935	1,221	+0.8%

Year	Pop.	±%
1947	1,137	−6.9%
1960	1,167	+2.6%
1970	1,342	+15.0%
1981	1,688	+25.8%
1990	2,037	+20.7%
2000	2,817	+38.3%

Year	Pop.	±%
2005	3,183	+13.0%
2010	3,722	+16.9%
2015	4,104	+10.3%
2020	4,746	+15.6%
2021	4,769	+0.5%

Source: Population par canton et commune
Source data

== Notable people ==
- Robert Alesch (1906–1949), a Catholic priest, paid Nazi collaborator and double agent, executed by Firing squad
- Gaston Gibéryen (born 1950), a Luxembourgish politician, mayor of Frisange (1982-2005) and member of the Chamber of Deputies (1989-2020)
- Gil Linster (born 1993), Luxembourgish racing driver
- Léa Linster (born 1955), a Luxembourgish chef and first woman to win the Bocuse d’Or in 1989. (Not associated with Gil Linster)

== Twin towns ==
Frisange is twinned with:

- Saint-Julien-de-Coppel, France
