= Hellange =

Town in Luxembourg

Hellange Helléng
- Town
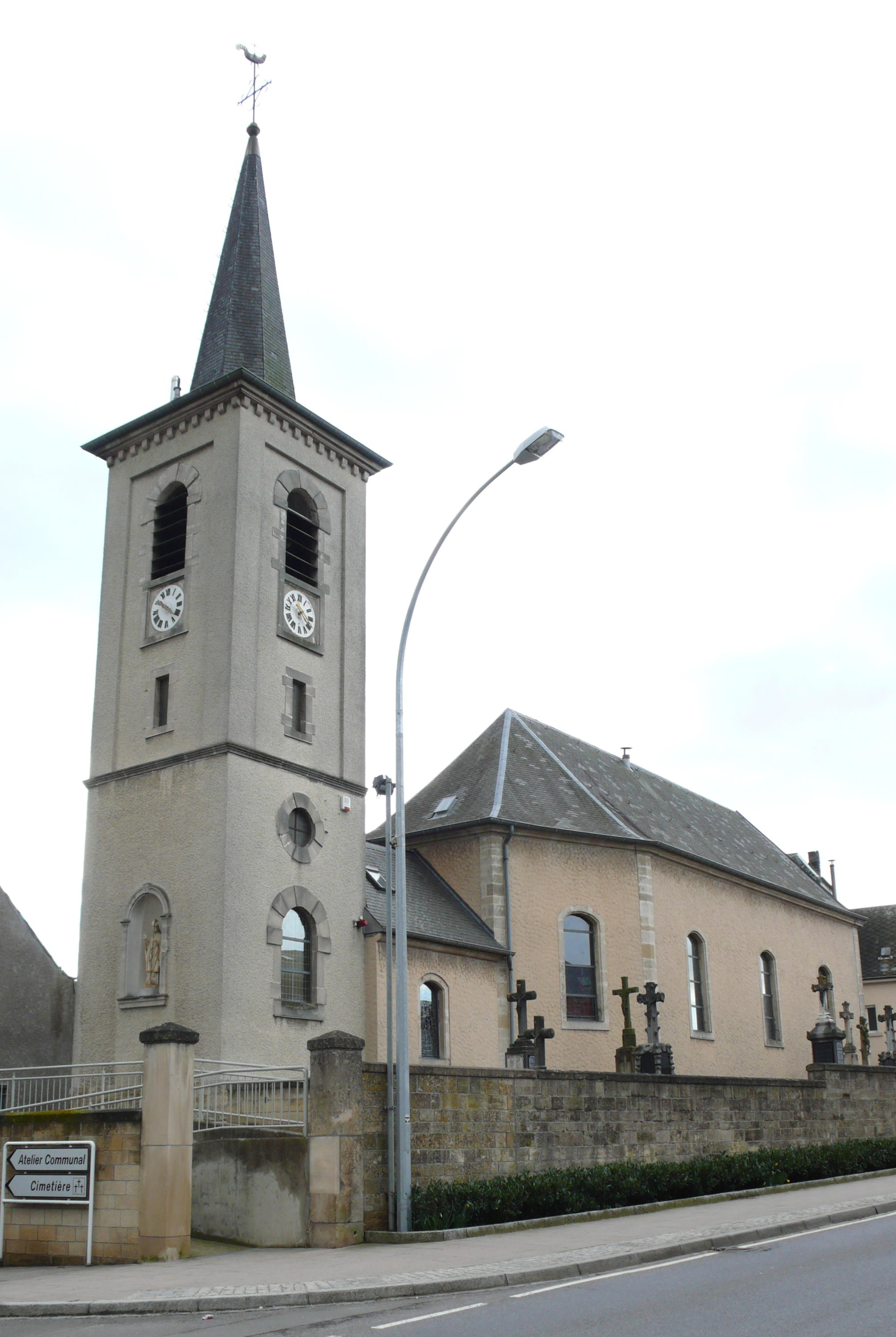
- Hellange

- Location within Luxembourg
- Coordinates: 49°30′N 6°09′E
- Country: Luxembourg
- Canton: Esch-sur-Alzette
- Commune: Frisange

Population (2025)
  - Total: 980

Hellange (French pronunciation: [ɛlɑ̃ʒ]; Luxembourgish: Helléng; German: Hellingen [ˈhɛlɪŋən]) is a small town in the commune of Frisange, in southern Luxembourg. As of September 2026, the town has a population of 1,000.

The terrain around Hellange is flat. The area surrounding the locality is relatively densely populated, with about 93 inhabitants per square kilometre. The nearest larger settlement is Luxembourg City, located to the north of Hellange.

The area around Hellange consists largely of agricultural land.

== Geography ==
Hellange lies at an elevation of approximately 256 metres above sea level. The settlement is located approximately 2 kilometres west of Frisange, along National Road 13, which connects Frisange to Bettembourg.

=== Administrative context ===
Hellange forms part of the commune of Frisange. The commune lies at the eastern edge of the canton of Esch-sur-Alzette. It borders the canton of Luxembourg to the north, the canton of Remich to the east, and France to the south. The commune’s highest point is in Aspelt at Krockelshaff (275 m), while the lowest is at Op de Greissen (232 m). Its total area is 1,842.9 hectares, including 14.5 km of rural roads and 7.5 km of local roads.

== History ==
One of the notable historical features of the small town is its church, dedicated to Saint Willibrord, which was built in 1812. In 2012, the town marked the 200th anniversary of the church with a series of celebrations, including concerts organised by the local music society La Lyre, which performed in the newly repainted church as part of the jubilee events.

== See also ==
- Frisange
- Canton of Esch-sur-Alzette
