= Lallange =

Quarter of Esch-sur-Alzette, Luxembourg

Coordinates: 49°30′38″N 5°59′27″E

Lallange church

Lallange (in red) within Esch-sur-Alzette

Lallange (Luxembourgish: Lalleng) is a quarter in the north-east of Esch-sur-Alzette, in south-western Luxembourg.

It was integrated into the city in 1906, and was developed mostly starting in the 1950s, as terrain was freed when the Esch-sur-Alzette aerodrome – the first in Luxembourg, predating Findel Airport – ceased its activity in 1954.
