= Pontpierre, Luxembourg =

Town in the commune of Mondercange in Luxembourg

Coordinates: 49°32′N 6°02′E

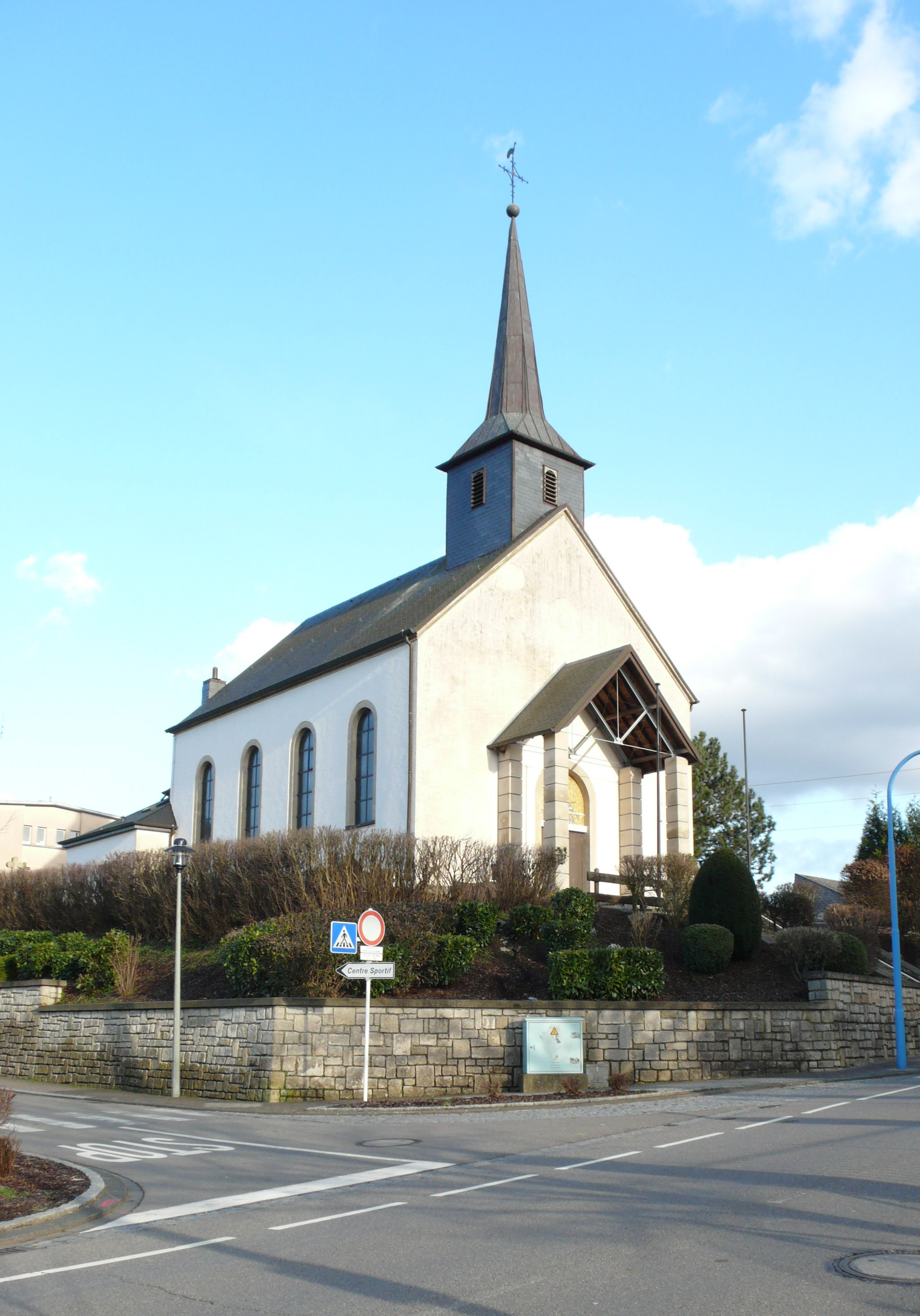
Church of Pontpierre

Pontpierre (French pronunciation: [pɔ̃pjɛʁ]; Luxembourgish: Steebrécken, German: Steinbrücken [ˈʃtaɪnˌbʁʏkn̩]) is a small town in the commune of Mondercange, in south-western Luxembourg. As of September 2026, it has a population of 1,192 inhabitants.
