= Foetz =

Town in the commune of Mondercange in Luxembourg

Coordinates: 49°31′N 6°01′E

Foetz (Luxembourgish: Féiz) is a small town located in the commune of Mondercange, in south-western Luxembourg. As of September 2026, it has a population of 603 inhabitants.
