= Second Ali al-Rikabi government =

1920 Syrian government

- 5th government of the Arab Kingdom of Syria

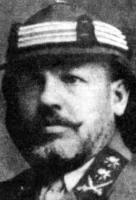
- Date formed: 9 March 1920
- Date dissolved: 3 May 1920

People and organisations
- King: Faisal I
- Prime Minister: Ali al-Rikabi
- No. of ministers: 9

History
- Incoming formation: Declaration of Independence
- Predecessor: Council of Directors II
- Successor: al-Atassi I

The Second Ali al-Rikabi government was formed by an official princely decree dated 9 March 1920, published in al-Asima newspaper, issue no. 108 of 1920. It was the first government formed after the first Syrian declaration of the independence and the establishment of the Arab Kingdom of Syria. It was also the first government to include the position of Minister of Foreign Affairs, and the first ministry to present its ministerial statement to the Syrian National Congress and receive confidence based on it.

The government was close to King Faisal I and included figures who did not support fighting France and instead called for accepting the mandate. Due to the tension between the government and the majority in the Syrian National Congress, who advocated fighting France, confidence was withdrawn from it on 2 May 1920, in response to what the Congress considered collusion in dealing with the French occupation of the Western Beqaa region. The government resigned on 3 May 1920 in light of the announcement placing Syria under mandate rule.

== Achievements ==
In this government's ministerial statement, it declared that its foreign policy would not conflict with that of the Allies, but would instead cooperate with them to secure the country's existing independence.

On the domestic front, the government approved the continuation of all laws issued under the Ottoman Empire until the National Congress had replaces them. It also stated that it would organize elections for a legislative council after the constitution was approved by the Congress, and that it would work to translate scientific books into Arabic in support of culture.

Neither of these goals was achieved due to rapidly escalating internal events, namely the opposition of the Syrian National Congress to the government's foreign policy of accepting the French mandate over Syria, especially after it was officially approved at the San Remo Conference.

The government also approved a project to build textile factories in Aleppo and other regions, in cooperation with local merchants.

In April, the government issued the basic law for Syrian currency, naming it the Syrian Dinar, pegged to gold and divided into one hundred qirsh, with every twenty-five qirsh considered one riyal.

The government also called upon all those born in 1900 for compulsory military service, implementing the mandatory conscription law issued by the previous government.

== Composition ==
Portfolio	Minister	Took office	Left office
Prime Minister	Ali al-Rikabi	9 March 1920	3 May 1920
President of the Consultative Council	Aladdin al-Droubi	9 March 1920	3 May 1920
Minister of Interior	Rida al-Sulh	9 March 1920	3 May 1920
Minister of Foreign Affairs	Saeed al-Husseini (acting) (Note: The office of Minister of Foreign Affairs was to be taken by Awni Abd al-Hadi upon his arrival.)	9 March 1920	3 May 1920
Minister of War	Abdul Hamid al-Qaltaqji (acting) (Note: The office of Minister of War was to be taken by Yusuf al-Azma upon his arrival.)	9 March 1920	3 May 1920
Minister of Finance	Fares al-Khoury (acting)	9 March 1920	3 May 1920
Minister of Justice	Jalal al-Din Zuhdi (acting)	9 March 1920	3 May 1920
Minister of Education	Sati' al-Husri	9 March 1920	3 May 1920
Minister of Public Works, Trade, and Agriculture	Yusuf al-Hakim (acting)	9 March 1920	3 May 1920

== See also ==
- Council of Ministers (Syria)
- List of Syrian governments
- Government ministries of Syria
- List of prime ministers of Syria
