= Council of Directors (1920) =

1920 Syrian government

- 4th government of Syria

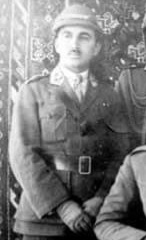
- Date formed: 26 January 1920
- Date dissolved: 8 March 1920

People and organisations
- Governor-General: Faisal bin Hussein
- Chairman: Zeid bin Hussein (acting)
- No. of ministers: 10

History
- Outgoing formation: Declaration of Independence
- Predecessor: First Council of Directors
- Successor: al-Rikabi II

The Council of Directors was formed on 26 January 1920 at the direction of Prince Faisal and headed by his brother Prince Zeid bin Hussein. It was announced through an official decree published in al-Asima gazette, issue No. 96 of 1920. Its mandate ended with the declaration of Syrian independence, after the Syrian National Congress resolved on 7 March 1920 to proclaim Faisal king of Syria. The government resigned on 8 March 1920.

== Notable Achievements and Events ==
The situation with the Allied powers was highly unstable throughout this government's tenure. Among its most prominent activities was military preparedness — seeking to secure the arms and equipment needed by the Syrian army. The government also supported rebels fighting against France, which had occupied the Syrian coast, Lebanon, and the Sanjak of Alexandretta. This deepened tensions with General Henri Gouraud, who had been appointed by the French government as High Commissioner for Syria and Lebanon.

During a visit to Paris on 6 January 1920, head of government Faisal acknowledged Lebanese independence and the establishment of a Druze federation in Hauran and the Golan, and recognised the French Mandate and the Balfour Declaration. This triggered widespread protests across Syria condemning what became known as the "Faisal–Clemenceau Agreement," and the government subsequently reversed its position.

Head of government Faisal bin al-Hussein called the Syrian National Congress to convene on 1 March 1920 with the goal of declaring independence, which was duly proclaimed on 8 March 1920.

== Composition ==
Portfolio	Minister	Took office	Left office
Chairman of the Council of Directors	Prince Zeid bin Hussein (acting)	26 January 1920	8 March 1920
General Secretary of the Council of Directors	Amin al-Tamimi	26 January 1920	8 March 1920
Director of Public Security	Ali Jawdat (acting)	26 January 1920	8 March 1920
Director of War	Ali Rida al-Rikabi	26 January 1920	8 March 1920
Chief of Staff of the Military Consultative Guard	Yusuf al-Azma	26 January 1920	8 March 1920
Director of Public Works	Ahmad Hilmi	26 January 1920	8 March 1920
Chief Advisor	Aladdin al-Droubi	26 January 1920	8 March 1920
Assistant to the General Military Governor	Adil Arslan	26 January 1920	8 March 1920
Chairman of the Board	Abdul Rahman al-Yusuf	26 January 1920	8 March 1920
Director of Interior	Rashid Talaa	30 September 1918	8 March 1920

== See also ==
- Council of Ministers (Syria)
- List of Syrian governments
- Government ministries of Syria
- List of prime ministers of Syria
