= First Hashim al-Atassi government =

1920 Syrian government

- 6th government of the Arab Kingdom of Syria

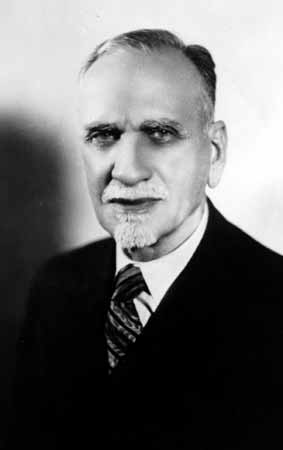
- Date formed: 3 May 1920
- Date dissolved: 24 July 1920

People and organisations
- King: Faisal I
- Prime Minister: Hashim al-Atassi
- No. of ministers: 9

History
- Outgoing formation: Capture of Damascus
- Predecessor: al-Rikabi II
- Successor: al-Droubi

The First Hashim al-Atassi government was formed by a memorandum issued by King Faisal I on 3 May 1920, and was published in al-Asima in issue No. 123 of 1920.

It was the second government during the Arab Kingdom of Syria, and the last one to present its ministerial statement to the Syrian National Congress and receive confidence on that basis. The government included nationalist figures who opposed the French Mandate for Syria and the partition of the Levant. Its ministerial declaration focused heavily on foreign policy because of the rapidly escalating events and increasing foreign pressure, particularly after France occupied the Western Beqaa region.

In its ministerial statement, the government declared that it would work to preserve full and complete independence without any guardianship or mandate, secure recognition of the territorial unity of the Levant within a single state, reject the separation of Palestine in preparation for implementing the Balfour Declaration, and oppose the independence of Lebanon, while accepting a form of autonomous self-rule for it.

The government remained in office until the French army occupied Damascus on 24 July 1920.

== Achievements ==
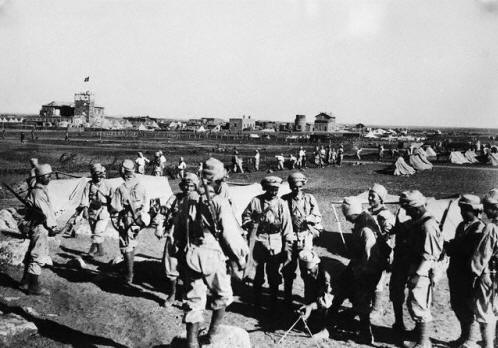
Syrian soldiers during the Battle of Maysalun on 24 July 1920. Syria's defeat in the battle led to the fall of the Arab Kingdom of Syria.

The country was suffering from severe economic hardship, and the government was nearly bankrupt, especially after the United Kingdom halted financial support to King Faisal I and several government sectors. As a result, the government opened a national loan worth half a million Syrian dinars, guaranteed by state-owned lands in Aleppo, Hama, and Homs. The government also undertook several arms procurement efforts; however, weapons purchases were conducted through arms dealers from the Arabian Peninsula and Iraq rather than directly from states. Despite this, the army remained poorly equipped. Inventory records showed that military supplies amounted to no more than 270 bullets per rifle and eighty shells per artillery piece. This led former army commander Yasin al-Hashimi to state that the army's supplies were insufficient for any battle, regardless of its duration.

Politically, and in line with its anti-mandate composition, the government and King Faisal I rejected the resolutions of the San Remo conference, which provided for the independence of Lebanon, Palestine, and Jordan, and the detachment of the northern Syrian territories and Mosul vilayet from Syria.

In June 1920, the government and subsequently the Syrian National Congress approved the constitution of the kingdom, consisting of 147 articles divided into twelve chapters. It established a constitutional, secular, parliamentary monarchy. On 15 June, the king and government declared a state of emergency and martial law due to what they described as “the dangerous conditions facing the country.”

On 13 June 1920, the government held a meeting at the royal palace chaired by King Faisal I, during which it accepted an ultimatum from Henri Gouraud, commander of the French forces in the Levant. The ultimatum threatened the occupation of Damascus if the mandate was rejected and included ten additional conditions, most notably the dissolution of the army.

The decision to dissolve the army was officially adopted by the government on 20 July along with the other conditions. This sparked a popular uprising in Damascus, during which protesters occupied the Citadel of Damascus. Demonstrators accused the government and the king of conspiracy, and police used live ammunition, killing twenty people.

Gouraud later claimed that the telegram confirming acceptance of the mandate's conditions had not reached Beirut because telegraph and telephone lines had been cut. French forces advanced toward Damascus on 21 July. Gouraud met an envoy of the king on the road and demanded additional conditions. After negotiations, Yusuf al-Azma, accompanied by the army and volunteers, took positions at Maysalun to slow the French advance. The Battle of Maysalun took place on 24 July 1920. Meanwhile, French forces had occupied Aleppo without resistance on 23 July. The Syrian army was defeated at Maysalun, and the French entered Damascus on 25 July.

Following the occupation of Damascus, the cabinet resigned at the request of the king, who left the city for al-Kiswah. Negotiations between the king and the French, conducted through Ihsan al-Jabri, Faris al-Khoury, and Aladdin al-Droubi, resulted in the appointment of al-Droubi to form a new government, as he was considered acceptable to both the king and the French authorities.

== Composition ==
Of the nine ministers in the previous government, six retained their portfolios. The prime minister, minister of war, and foreign minister were replaced by figures acceptable to the nationalist anti-mandate bloc in the Syrian National Congress. The original lineup included George Rizqallah, a notable from Beirut, but his name was removed following objections from Sheikh Kamil al-Qassab, leader of the nationalist bloc in parliament, due to Rizqallah's close ties with the French. Saeed al-Husseini of Jerusalem was also excluded as a concession to the United Kingdom, a move that angered the Syrian National Congress.

Portfolio	Minister	Took office	Left office
Prime Minister	Hashim al-Atassi	3 May 1920	24 July 1920
Minister of Interior	Hashim al-Atassi (acting)	3 May 1920	5 May 1920
Minister of Interior	Rida al-Sulh	5 May 1920	12 July 1920
Minister of Interior	Aladdin al-Droubi	12 July 1920	24 July 1920
Minister of Foreign Affairs	Abdul Rahman Shahbandar	3 May 1920	24 July 1920
Minister of War	Yusuf al-Azma	3 May 1920	24 July 1920
Minister of Finance	Fares al-Khoury	9 March 1920	24 July 1920
Minister of Justice	Muhammad Jalal al-Din al-Zuhdi	9 March 1920	24 July 1920
Minister of Education	Sati' al-Husri	9 March 1920	24 July 1920
Minister of Public Works, Trade, and Agriculture	George Rizqallah	3 May 1920	5 May 1920
Minister of Public Works, Trade, and Agriculture	Yusuf al-Hakim	5 May 1920	24 July 1920
President of the Consultative Council	Rida al-Sulh	3 May 1920	5 May 1920
President of the Consultative Council	Aladdin al-Droubi	5 May 1920	24 July 1920

== See also ==
- Council of Ministers (Syria)
- List of Syrian governments
- Government ministries of Syria
- List of prime ministers of Syria
