= First Ali al-Rikabi government =

1918–1919 Syrian government

- 2nd government of Syria

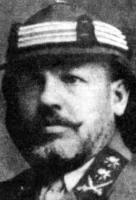
- Date formed: 30 September 1918
- Date dissolved: 4 August 1919

People and organisations
- Prince: Faisal bin Hussein
- Military Governor: Ali al-Rikabi
- No. of ministers: 8

History
- Incoming formation: Capture of Damascus
- Predecessor: al-Jaza'iri
- Successor: Council of Directors I

The First Ali al-Rikabi government was formed by princely decree on 30 September 1918, and with a mandate from General Edmund Allenby, Commander of British Forces in the Levant. Its head exercised the powers of Military Governor over Ottoman Syria while the shape of future rule remained unclear following the Ottoman withdrawal. The government was composed of members from various regions of historic Greater Syria, and swore loyalty to Sharif Hussein bin Ali, calling him "Savior of the Arabs." In practice, however, it cooperated and operated under the command of Faisal I, who would later become King of the Arab Kingdom of Syria. When Prince Faisal arrived in Damascus on 3 October 1918, he confirmed al-Rikabi in his position as prime minister. The government resigned by princely decree on 4 August 1919.

== Notable Achievements ==
The period during which this government led the country was an extremely sensitive and transitional one. The al-Rikabi government appointed a Consultative Council composed of scholars, literary figures, and legal experts to assist in administering the country. It then issued the first official gazette in Damascus, named al-Asima ("The Capital"), for the publication of laws, decrees, and official decisions. It also issued a decree mandating the use of Egyptian currency, including for tax purposes, as it was the dominant currency in the market.

The al-Rikabi government abolished the Ottoman courts and established modern civil courts that did not discriminate on the basis of religion, as the Ottoman courts previously had. It also abolished Ottoman titles such as "Pasha" and "Bey," though these continued to be used in Syria as a matter of custom.

The government additionally established the Arab Academy of Damascus – the oldest modern Arab language academy in existence — and resumed operations at the Colleges of Medicine and Law, which had been founded during the Ottoman era, forming what would later become the nucleus of the Syrian University. The government also appointed state officials, governors over cities, and police and internal security chiefs; oversaw the elections of the Syrian National Congress; and granted Faisal bin Hussein a mandate to represent and advocate for Syria abroad.

== Composition ==
Portfolio	Minister	Took office	Left office
Head of Government & Military Governor	Ali Rida al-Rikabi (Damascus)	30 September 1918	4 August 1919
Deputy Governor	Adel Arslan (Mount Lebanon)	30 September 1918	4 August 1919
Chief of the Army	Yasin al-Hashimi (Baghdad)	30 September 1918	4 August 1919
Director of Finance	Said Shuqair (Beirut)	30 September 1918	4 August 1919
Director of Justice	Iskandar Ammoun (Mount Lebanon)	30 September 1918	4 August 1919
Director of Interior	Rashid Talaa (Mount Lebanon)	30 September 1918	4 August 1919
Director of Health	Salim Pasha al-Mawsili (Damascus)	30 September 1918	4 August 1919
Director of Education	Sati' al-Husri (Aleppo)	30 September 1918	4 August 1919

== See also ==
- Council of Ministers (Syria)
- List of Syrian governments
- Government ministries of Syria
- List of prime ministers of Syria
