= Declaration of independence =

Assertion by a defined territory that it is independent and constitutes a state

A declaration of independence is an assertion by a polity in a defined territory that it is independent and constitutes a state. Such places are usually declared from part or all of the territory of another state or failed state, or are breakaway territories from within the larger state. In 2010, the UN's International Court of Justice ruled in an advisory opinion in Kosovo that "International law contains no prohibition on declarations of independence", though the state from which the territory wishes to secede may regard the declaration as rebellion, which may lead to a war of independence or a constitutional settlement to resolve the crisis. Unofficial and symbolic declarations of independence can also be used to make a political statement like "A Declaration of the Independence of Cyberspace" by John Perry Barlow in 1996.

== List of declarations of independence ==
| State | Declaration | Date | Association | Signatories | First recognizing state(s) |
|---|---|---|---|---|---|
| Algeria | Declaration of 1 November 1954 | November 1, 1954 | Algeria | Algerian War | French Algeria |
| Albania | Albanian Declaration of Independence | November 28, 1912 | Ottoman Empire | Assembly of Vlorë | Austria-Hungary |
| Ambazonia | Ambazonian Declaration of Independence | October 1, 2017 | Cameroon | Southern Cameroons Ambazonia Consortium United Front | |
| Armenia | Declaration of Independence of Armenia | May 28, 1918 | TDFR | Armenian National Congress (1917), Armenian Revolutionary Federation | Ottoman Empire |
| Armenia | Declaration of State Sovereignty of Armenia | August 23, 1990 | Soviet Union | Levon Ter-Petrosyan and Supreme Council of Armenia secretary Ara Sahakian | Lithuania |
| Artsakh | Proclamation of the Nagorno Karabakh Republic | September 2, 1991 | Soviet Union | Nagorno-Karabakh Regional and Shahumyan District Councils of People's Deputies of the Azerbaijan SSR | |
| Azawad | Azawadi Declaration of Independence | April 6, 2012 | Mali | National Movement for the Liberation of Azawad | |
| Azerbaijan | Declaration of Independence of Azerbaijan | May 28, 1918 | TDFR | Azerbaijani National Council | Ottoman Empire |
| Azerbaijan | Act on Restoration of State Independence of Azerbaijan | October 18, 1991 | Soviet Union | Supreme Council of Azerbaijan | Turkey |
| Bangladesh | Proclamation of Bangladeshi Independence 1947 | August 15, 1947 | United Kingdom | Constituent Assembly of Bangladesh | United Kingdom |
| Bangladesh | Proclamation of Bangladeshi Independence | March 26, 1971 | United Kingdom | Constituent Assembly of Bangladesh | India |
| Belarus | Third Constituent Charter | March 25, 1918 | Russian SFSR | Rada of the Belarusian Democratic Republic | |
| Belarus | Announcement of the Declaration of Independence of the Soviet Socialist Republic of Byelorussia | July 31, 1920 | Poland | Communist Party (Bolsheviks) of Byelorussia, trade unions | Russian SFSR |
| Belarus | Declaration of State Sovereignty of the Belarusian Soviet Socialist Republic | July 27, 1990 | Soviet Union | Supreme Soviet of the BSSR | Turkey |
| Belgium | Belgian Declaration of Independence | October 4, 1830 | Netherlands | Provisional Government of Belgium | |
| Bosnia and Herzegovina | Bosnian Declaration of Independence | March 1, 1992 | Yugoslavia | | Bulgaria |
| Bougainville | Bougainville Declaration of Independence | May 1990 | Papua New Guinea | Bougainville Interim Government | |
| Brazil | Declaration of the Independence of Brazil | September 7, 1822 | Portugal | Pedro I of Brazil | United States |
| Bulgaria | Bulgarian Declaration of Independence | September 22, 1908 | Ottoman Empire | Ferdinand of Bulgaria and the Government of Bulgaria | Russia |
| Burma | Burmese Declaration of Independence | January 4, 1948 | United Kingdom | | |
| Catalonia | Declaration of the Catalan Republic as a state of the Iberian Federation | April 14, 1931 | Spain | Francesc Macià, Generalitat Government of Catalonia | |
| Catalonia | Declaration of the Catalan state within the Federal Republic of Spain | October 6, 1934 | Spain | Lluís Companys, Generalitat Government of Catalonia | |
| Catalonia | Declaration from the representatives of Catalonia as the Catalan Republic | October 27, 2017 | Spain | | |
| Central America (present-day: Costa Rica; El Salvador; Guatemala; Honduras; Nicaragua) | Act of Independence of Central America | September 15, 1821 | Spain | | |
| Chile | Chilean Declaration of Independence | February 12, 1818 | Spain | National Congress | Portugal |
| Colombia | Colombian Declaration of Independence | July 20, 1810 | Spain | | |
| Comoros | Comorian Declaration of Independence | July 6, 1975 | France | | Guinea |
| Crimea | Declaration of Independence of the Republic of Crimea | March 11, 2014 | Ukraine | Supreme Council of Crimea | Russia |
| Croatia | Declaration of the Establishment of the Sovereign and Independent Republic of Croatia | June 25, 1991 | Yugoslavia | | Iceland |
| Czechoslovakia | Czechoslovak Declaration of Independence | October 18, 1918 | Austria-Hungary | Czechoslovak National Council | United States |
| Czechoslovakia | Martin Declaration | October 30, 1918 | Austria-Hungary | Slovak National Council | France |
| Dominican Republic | Dominican Act of Independence (1844) | February 27, 1844 | Haiti | | United Kingdom |
| Dominican Republic | Dominican Act of Independence (1863) | August 16, 1863 | Spain | | Spain |
| East Timor | East Timorese declaration of independence | November 28, 1975 | Portugal | | Morocco |
| Egypt | Unilateral Declaration of Egyptian Independence | February 28, 1922 | United Kingdom | Unilateral grant of independence by the British government | United Kingdom |
| Estonia | Estonian Declaration of Independence | February 24, 1918 | Germany; Russia | Estonian Salvation Committee | Finland |
| Estonia | Estonian Reconfirmation of Independence | August 20, 1991 | Soviet Union | Congress of Estonia | Iceland (reconfirmed earlier recognition) |
| Finland | Finnish Declaration of Independence | December 6, 1917 | Russia | Parliament of Finland | Russian SFSR |
| First Mexican Empire (present-day Mexico) | Declaration of Independence of the Mexican Empire (real independence) | September 28, 1821 | Spain | Supreme Provisional Governmental Board | United Kingdom |
| Florida | Florida's Constitution of 1861 | January 10, 1861 | United States | Florida State Legislature | |
| Galicia | Declaration of the Republic of Galicia | June 27, 1931 | Spain | | |
| Georgia, Democratic Republic of | Georgian Declaration of Independence, 1918 | May 26, 1918 | TDFR | Georgian National Council | Germany |
| Georgia, Republic of | Act of Restoration of State Independence of Georgia | April 9, 1991 | Soviet Union | Supreme Council of the Republic of Georgia | Switzerland |
| Georgia, State of | Georgia's secession declaration | January 29, 1861 | United States | | |
| Greece | Greek Declaration of Independence | January 15, 1822 | Ottoman Empire | First National Assembly | Haiti |
| Guinea-Bissau | Guinea-Bissau Declaration of Independence | September 24, 1973 | Portugal | | |
| Haiti | Haitian Declaration of Independence | January 1, 1804 | France | Jean-Jacques Dessalines | France |
| Hungary | Hungarian Declaration of Independence | April 14, 1849 | Habsburgs | | |
| Iceland | Icelandic Declaration of Independence | June 17, 1944 | Denmark | | United States |
| India | Indian Rebellion of 1857 | May 10, 1857 | United Kingdom | Mughal Empire | |
| India | Declaration of the Independence of India | January 26, 1930 | United Kingdom | | |
| India | Declaration of Independence | August 15, 1947 | United Kingdom | | |
| Indonesia | Proclamation of Indonesian Independence | August 17, 1945 | Netherlands | Sukarno & Mohammad Hatta | Kingdom of Egypt |
| Iraq | Iraq Declaration of Independence | October 3, 1932 | United Kingdom | | United Kingdom |
| Ireland | Proclamation of the Irish Republic | April 24, 1916 | United Kingdom | Provisional Government of the Irish Republic | |
| Irish Republic | Irish Declaration of Independence | January 21, 1919 | United Kingdom | Dáil Éireann | Russian SFSR |
| Israel | Israeli Declaration of Independence | May 14, 1948 | United Kingdom | Jewish People's Council | United States |
| Katanga | Katangan Declaration of Independence | July 11, 1960 | Congo-Léopoldville | | |
| Kazakhstan | On the State Independence of the Republic of Kazakhstan | December 16, 1991 | Soviet Union | Supreme Soviet of the Republic of Kazakhstan | Turkey |
| Korea | Korean Declaration of Independence | March 1, 1919 | Japan | Provisional Government of the Republic of Korea | China |
| Kosova | Proclamation of the Republic of Kosova | September 22, 1992 | FR Yugoslavia | Assembly of Kosovo | Albania |
| Kosovo | Kosovo declaration of independence | February 17, 2008 | Serbia; UN Administration | "Democratically elected leaders of our people" (Note: No reference in original Albanian text to the declaration being the work of the Assembly of Kosovo. The language used in the declaration differs from that employed in acts of the Assembly of Kosovo in that the first paragraph commences with the phrase "We, the democratically-elected leaders of our people . . .", whereas acts of the Assembly of Kosovo employ the third person singular. Moreover, the procedure employed in relation to the declaration differed from that employed by the Assembly of Kosovo for the adoption of legislation. It was not transmitted to the Special Representative of the Secretary General and was not published in the Official Gazette of the Provisional Institutions of Self-Government of Kosovo. As the practice shows, he would have been under a duty to take action with regard to acts of the Assembly of Kosovo which he considered to be ultra vires. Taking all factors together, the authors of the declaration of independence of 17 February 2008 did not act as one of the Provisional Institutions of Self-Government within the Constitutional Framework, but rather as persons who acted together in their capacity as representatives of the people of Kosovo outside the framework of the interim administration.) | Costa Rica |
| Latvia | Latvian Declaration of Independence | November 18, 1918 | Germany; Russian SFSR | People's Council of Latvia | Russian SFSR |
| Latvia | On the Restoration of Independence of the Republic of Latvia | May 4, 1990 | Soviet Union | Supreme Soviet of the Latvian SSR | Iceland |
| Liberia | Liberian Declaration of Independence | July 16, 1847 | American Colonization Society | Liberian Constitutional Convention | United Kingdom |
| Lithuania | Act of Independence of Lithuania | February 16, 1918 | Germany; Russian SFSR | Council of Lithuania | Germany |
| Lithuania | Act of the Re-Establishment of the State of Lithuania | March 11, 1990 | Soviet Union | Supreme Council of Lithuania | Iceland |
| Lower Canada | Declaration of Independence of Lower Canada | February 22, 1838 | United Kingdom | Robert Nelson | |
| Macedonia | Independence of the Republic of Macedonia | September 8, 1991 | Yugoslavia | | Bulgaria |
| Malaya (present-day Malaysia) | Federation of Malaya Independence Act 1957 | August 31, 1957 | United Kingdom | Tunku Abdul Rahman, Prime Minister of Malaysia | United Kingdom |
| Mississippi | A Declaration of the Immediate Causes which Induce and Justify the Secession of the State of Mississippi from the Federal Union | January 9, 1861 | United States | | |
| Moldova | Declaration of Independence of the Republic of Moldova | August 27, 1991 | Soviet Union | Parliament of the Republic of Moldova | Romania |
| Montenegro | Montenegro declaration of independence | June 3, 2006 | Serbia and Montenegro | Assembly of the Republic of Montenegro | Iceland |
| Morocco | Moroccan Declaration of Independence | January 11, 1944 | France | Istiqlal Party | |
| Netherlands | Act of Abjuration | July 26, 1581 | Spain | Union of Utrecht | |
| Northern America (present-day Mexico) | Solemn Act of the Declaration of Independence of Northern America | November 6, 1813 | Spain | Congress of Anáhuac | |
| Northern Cyprus | Declaration of Independence of the Turkish Republic of Northern Cyprus | November 15, 1983 | Cyprus | | Turkey |
| Northern Epirus | Northern Epirote Declaration of Independence | February 28, 1914 | Albania | Provisional Government of Northern Epirus | |
| North Solomons | Declaration of Independence of the Republic of the North Solomons | September 1, 1975 | Territory of Papua and New Guinea (Australia) | Unknown | Vatican City |
| Norway (Kingdom of Norway) | Declaration of Independence of Norway (short after, sovereign under the Swedish monarchy), and the Constitution of Norway | May 17, 1814 | Denmark-Norway (As of Treaty of Kiel) | Norwegian Constituent Assembly | |
| North Korea | National Liberation Day of Korea | September 9, 1948 | Japan | Kim Il Sung | Soviet Union |
| Padania | Padanian Declaration of Independence | September 15, 1996 | Italy | | |
| Pakistan | Lahore Resolution | March 24, 1940 | United Kingdom | Muslim League (Pakistan) | |
| Palestine | Palestinian Declaration of Independence | November 15, 1988 | Palestinian territories Jordan (claimed the West Bank until 1988) | Palestinian National Council | Arab League |
| Peru | Act of the Declaration of Independence of Peru | July 28, 1821 | Spain | José de San Martín | Argentina |
| Panama | Secession of Panama from Colombia | November 3, 1903 | Colombia | | United States |
| Philippines | Philippine Declaration of Independence | June 12, 1898 | Spain | 98 representatives of Dictatorial Government of the Philippines (ratified on September 29, 1898, by the Malolos Congress) | |
| Provinces of the Río de la Plata (present-day: Argentina; Bolivia; Uruguay) | Argentine Declaration of Independence | July 9, 1816 | Spain | Congress of Tucumán | Hawaii |
| Rhodesia | Rhodesian Unilateral Declaration of Independence | November 11, 1965 | United Kingdom | Ian Smith and the rest of the Cabinet | |
| Romania | Romanian Declaration of Independence | May 22, 1877 | Ottoman Empire | King Carol I | |
| Russia | Belovezha Accords | December 12, 1991 | Soviet Union | Supreme Soviet of the Russian SFSR | |
| Sahrawi Arab Democratic Republic | Bir Lehlou Declaration | February 27, 1976 | Spanish Sahara | Polisario Front | Madagascar |
| Scotland | Declaration of Arbroath | April 6, 1320 | England | Scottish leaders | |
| Serbia | The Proclamation (Proglašenije/Проглашеније) | February 1809 | Ottoman Empire | Karađorđe Petrović and Serbian MPs | |
| Singapore | Proclamation of Singapore | August 9, 1965 | Malaysia | Lee Kuan Yew, Prime Minister of Singapore | United Kingdom |
| Slovakia | Slovak National Council's Declaration of Independence of the Slovak Nation | July 17, 1992 | Czechoslovakia | Slovak National Council | Czech Republic |
| Slovenia | Slovenian Declaration of Independence | June 25, 1991 | Yugoslavia | | Croatia |
| Somaliland | Somaliland Declaration of Independence | May 18, 1991 | Somalia | | |
| South Korea | National Liberation Day of Korea | August 15, 1948 | Japan | Syngman Rhee | United States |
| South Carolina | Declaration of the Immediate Causes Which Induce and Justify the Secession of South Carolina from the Federal Union | December 24, 1860 | United States | South Carolinians in Charleston | |
| Sri Lanka | Declaration of Independence of Sri Lanka (Then known as "Ceylon") | February 4, 1948 | United Kingdom | | |
| Syria | Syrian Declaration of Independence (1920) | March 8, 1920 | Ottoman Empire | Syrian National Congress | |
| Syria | Syrian Declaration of Independence (1941) | September 27, 1941 | Free France | Georges Catroux | United Kingdom; Egypt |
| Texas, Republic of | Texas Declaration of Independence | March 2, 1836 | Mexico | | France |
| Texas, State of | A Declaration of the Causes which Impel the State of Texas to Secede from the Federal Union | February 1, 1861 | United States | Texas Legislature | |
| Tibet | Tibet's Declaration of Independence | February 13, 1913 | China | 13th Dalai Lama | Bogd Khanate of Mongolia |
| Turkmenistan | About Independence and Bases of a State System of Turkmenistan | October 27, 1991 | Soviet Union | none | Turkey |
| Ukraine | IV Universal | January 22, 1918 | Russian SFSR | Central Council of Ukraine | |
| Ukraine | Declaration of Independence of Ukraine | August 24, 1991 | Soviet Union | Verkhovna Rada | Canada; Poland |
| United States | United States Declaration of Independence | July 4, 1776 (Note: The Continental Congress voted in favor of the Declaration of Independence on July 2. Versions were not printed until July 4 and later, while the signatories did not sign the Matlack declaration until August.) | Great Britain | Second Continental Congress | Morocco |
| United Tribes of New Zealand | Declaration of the Independence of New Zealand | October 28, 1835 | — | Māori chiefs | United Kingdom |
| Uzbekistan | Declaration of Independence | August 31, 1991 | Soviet Union | Supreme Council of Uzbekistan | Turkey |
| Venezuela | Venezuelan Declaration of Independence | July 5, 1811 | Spain | National Congress | |
| Vermont | Vermont Declaration of Independence | January 15, 1777 | United States British Quebec | | |
| Vietnam | Proclamation of Independence of the Democratic Republic of Vietnam | September 2, 1945 | France | Hồ Chí Minh | China |
| Democratic Republic of the Yorubaland | Declaration of Independence | April 13, 2024 | Nigeria | Modupe Onitiri-Abiola and Ominira Yoruba Group | |

== See also ==
- Independence referendum
- List of national independence days
- List of sovereign states by date of formation
- Political history of the world
- Separatism
- Unilateral declaration of independence
