= List of members of the Syrian National Congress =

Syrian National Congress
Constituent Assembly	→

Overview
- Legislative body: Syrian National Congress
- Jurisdiction: Arab Kingdom of Syria
- Meeting place: The Arab Club building, Damascus
- Term: June 3, 1919 – July 25, 1929
- Election: 1919 Syrian National Congress election
- Government: al-Rikabi II (until May 3, 1920) al-Atassi I (since May 3, 1920)

Syrian National Congress
- Members: 120
- Speaker: Muhammad Fawzi al-Azm (until November 14, 1919); Hashim al-Atassi (December 11, 1919 – May 3, 1920); Rashid Rida (May 5, 1920)

Sessions
- 1st: June 3, 1919 – June 1919
- 2nd: November 22, 1919 – December 4, 1919
- 3rd: March 6, 1920 – July 25, 1920

This is a list of members of the Syrian National Congress. The Congress was held in Damascus in June 1919 after the end of Ottoman rule, to prepare for the reception of the King–Crane Commission and the decision of the future of natural Syria. Sources differ on the number of deputies in the Congress, but it is likely that there were 85 elected deputies representing various regions in Syria, Lebanon, Palestine and Jordan, most of whom were former deputies of the Ottoman Chamber of Deputies. Additionally, the Congress had 35 tribal chiefs and heads of religious communities. The total number of deputies is thus 120 members. This list includes the names of 97 members, the rest are unknown.

The Congress is the first national legislative body in the modern history of Syria. On March 7, 1920, it declared the independence of the Arab Kingdom of Syria and the installation of Prince Faisal as its king. It also formed a committee to draft the country's first constitution.

The members of the Congress were divided into three main blocs referred to as parties. However, it is unclear whether they constituted official party organizations or just parliamentary blocs. The blocs include the Progress Party, which formed the ruling bloc emanating from the al-Fatat organisation and included about 60 members, the Democratic Party, which represented the main opposition bloc and included about 30 members, in addition to a group of independent members who did not belong to either of the two blocs and are estimated at 20 members.

== List of deputies ==
No.	District	Name	Party
1	Damascus	Muhammad Fawzi Pasha al-Azm	
2	Damascus	Abd al-Rahman Pasha al-Yusuf	
3	Damascus	Fawzi al-Bakri	
4	Damascus	Abd al-Qadir al-Khatib	Democratic Party
5	Damascus	Taj al-Din al-Hasani	Democratic Party
6	Damascus	Mahmoud al-Baroudi	
7	Damascus	Ahmad al-Qudmani	Democratic Party
8	Damascus	Muslim al-Husni	
9	Damascus	Elias ‘Uwayshiq (Note: Deputy for the Christians of Damascus)	
10	Damascus	Youssef Leniado (Note: Deputy for the Jewish of Damascus)	
11	Aleppo	Mar'i Pasha al-Mallah	
12	Aleppo	Rida al-Rifa‘i	
13	Aleppo	Saadallah al-Jabiri	
14	Aleppo	Abd al-Rahman al-Kiyali	
15	Aleppo	Muhammad al-Mudarris	
16	Aleppo	Hikmat al-Nayyal	
17	Aleppo	Rashid al-Mudarris	
18	Aleppo	Sheikh Nuri al-Jisri	
19	Aleppo	Salim Janbart	
20	Aleppo	Theodor Antaki	
21	Aleppo	Ibrahim Hananu	
22	Homs	Hashim al-Atasi	Progress Party
23	Homs	Wasfi al-Atassi	
24	Homs	Mazhar Raslan	
25	Homs	Murshid Sama'an	
26	Deir ez-Zor	Fadel al-‘Aboud	
27	Deir ez-Zor	Muhammad Nuri al-Fatayih	
28	Deir ez-Zor	Ibrahim al-Hajj Hussein	
29	Nablus	Muhammad 'Izzat Darwaza	Progress Party
30	Nablus	Ibrahim al-Qasim	
31	Nablus	Adel Zaiter	
32	Nablus	Amin al-Tamimi	
33	Hama	Khaled al-Barazi	
34	Hama	Abd al-Hamid al-Baroudi	
35	Hama	Abd al-Qadir al-Kilani	
36	Beirut	Salim Ali Salam	
37	Beirut	Arif al-Nu‘mani	
38	Beirut	Jamil Bayhum	
39	Beirut	Amin Bayhum	
40	Beirut	George Harfoush	
41	Jerusalem	Raghib al-Nashashibi	
42	Jerusalem	Saeed al-Husseini	
43	Jerusalem	Arif al-Dajani	
44	Jerusalem	Ya‘qub Farraj	
45	Jaffa	Raghib al-Dajani	
46	Jaffa	Youssef al-‘Issa	
47	Haifa	Rashid al-Hajj Ibrahim	
48	Haifa	Mu‘in al-Madhi	
49	Hebron	Ahmad Qadri	
50	Hebron	Rafiq al-Tamimi	
51	Tripoli	Rashid Rida	
52	Tripoli	Tawfiq al-Bisar	
53	Tripoli	Othman Sultan	
54	Tripoli	Youssef al-Hakim	
55	Tripoli	Abd al-Majid al-Maghribi	
56	Latakia	Muhammad al-Khayr	
57	Latakia	Muhammad al-Shuraiqi	
58	Latakia	Munah Haroun	
59	Latakia	Subhi al-Tawil	
60	Sidon and Tyre	Rida al-Solh	
61	Sidon and Tyre	Riyad al-Solh	
62	Sidon and Tyre	Afif al-Solh	
63	Antioch	Subhi Barakat	
64	Antioch	Mustafa Lutfi al-Rifa‘i	
65	Idlib	Zaki Yahya	
66	Idlib	Fuad Abd al-Karim	
67	Idlib	Ahmad al-‘Ayashi	
68	Hauran	Fares Ahmad al-Zu‘bi	
69	Hauran	Nasser al-Zu‘bi	
70	Hauran	Abd al-Rahman al-Zu‘bi	
71	As-Salt	Saeed Abu Naji	
72	As-Salt	Saeed al-Sulaibi	
73	Mount Lebanon	Dr. Saeed Tali‘	
74	Mount Lebanon	Sheikh Ibrahim al-Khatib	
75	Azaz	Fath al-Mar‘ashi	
76	Azaz	Jalal al-Qudsi	
77	Ajloun	Abd al-Rahman Irshidat	
78	Ajloun	Suleiman al-Soudi	
79	Suwayda	Naseeb al-Atrash	
80	Quneitra	Prince Mahmoud al-Fa‘our	
81	Al-Bab	Sharif al-Darwish	
82	Jableh	Naji Ali Adeeb	
83	Jabal al-Hisn	Mustafa al-As‘ad al-Dandashi	
84	Harem	Youssef al-Kiyali	
85	Hasbaya	Fa’iz al-Shihabi	
86	Hisn al-Akrad	Da‘as al-Hajj Hassan	
87	Douma	Mahmoud al-Shishakli	
88	Akkar	Abd al-Fattah al-Sharif	
89	Karak	Issa Madanat	
90	Koura	Tawfiq Mufarrij	
91	Matn	Rashid Naffa‘	
92	Marjeyoun	Murad Ghalmiyah	
93	Ma'an	Khalil al-Tallhouni	
94	Mount Simeon	Sheikh Abd al-Hamid al-Jabri	
95	Ma'arrat al-Nu'man	Hikmat al-Haraki	
96	Manbij	Mahmoud Nadeem	
97	Nabk	Khalil Abu al-Reesh	
98			
99			
100			
101			
102			
103			
104			
105			
106			
107			
108			
109			
110			
111			
112			
113			
114			
115			
116			
117			
118			
119			
120			
