= 1919 Syrian National Congress election =

National Congress elections were held in Syria in May–June 1919 to choose representatives of the National Congress, a constituent assembly convened in Damascus after the collapse of Ottoman rule in the Arab provinces at the end of World War I. The elections were organised by the Arab government in Damascus under Emir Faisal in order to establish a representative body capable of expressing the political aspirations of the Syrian population.

The congress was intended to provide a political mandate for Faisal in negotiations with the Allied powers at the Paris Peace Conference and to present Syrian demands to the King–Crane Commission, which was sent to investigate public opinion in the former Ottoman Arab provinces.

Because parts of Syria were under French and British occupation, elections were held mainly in the interior regions controlled by the Arab administration, while representatives from other areas were chosen through informal or local initiatives.

== Background ==
Following the defeat of the Ottoman Empire in 1918, Arab political leaders attempted to create institutions capable of representing the population of Syria internationally. During a trip to Europe between November 1918 and April 1919, Emir Faisal became convinced of the need to establish a representative political body for the Syrian population.

Upon returning to Damascus, Faisal proposed the formation of a Syrian National Congress that would provide him with a clear mandate from the Syrian population. This was intended to strengthen his position in negotiations with the Allied powers and demonstrate that Syria was capable of self-government without the need for a foreign mandate under the proposed League of Nations system.

== Electoral system ==
The election was organised according to the Ottoman electoral law, which had governed elections to the Ottoman Chamber of Deputies since the restoration of the Ottoman constitution in 1908. Under this system, elections normally occurred in two stages, with voters first electing delegates who would then select parliamentary representatives.

Because of the urgent need to prepare for the arrival of the King–Crane Commission, the Arab administration modified the process. The governor of Damascus, Ali Rida al-Rikabi, instructed the electors who had participated in the last Ottoman elections of 1913 to meet in their districts and directly elect representatives to the congress, effectively bypassing the first stage of the usual electoral system.

Many of those elected were former Arab deputies who had served in the Ottoman parliament.

== Regional limitations ==
The elections could only be held in the eastern region of Syria, which was under the effective control of the Arab government in Damascus. The French authorities in the western occupied region (including Lebanon and the Mediterranean coast) and the British authorities in the southern region (Palestine) opposed the elections and prevented them from taking place in those territories.

In several areas under foreign occupation, local groups nevertheless attempted to select representatives through informal or secret meetings. These delegates were often chosen from local political clubs, literary societies, or from individuals who had previously served in the Ottoman parliament.

== Campaign ==
The election campaign was particularly active in Damascus, where rival political factions competed for influence. Conservative urban notables, including wealthy landowners such as Fawzi Pasha al-Azm and Abd al-Rahman Yusuf, opposed the Arab nationalist movement and criticized the leadership of Emir Faisal.

Arab nationalist activists organised demonstrations and distributed pamphlets advocating independence, sometimes using slogans such as “independence or death.” Members associated with the nationalist organization al-Fatat adopted a more moderate approach and responded to conservative criticism with liberal political proposals.

== Results ==
In Damascus, conservative candidates won the majority of seats.

The total number of representatives elected or selected for the congress was 120, though only 87 delegates ultimately arrived in Damascus to participate in the congress’s sessions.

Approximately 40% of the delegates represented the four main inland cities of Syria: Damascus, Homs, Hama, and Aleppo.

Several regions were underrepresented. Seats from Mount Lebanon were often vacant because Maronite leaders favoured the creation of a separate Lebanese state. Some representatives from Alawite and Druze regions also failed to attend due to political opposition to the Damascus government or because French and British authorities obstructed travel.

== Aftermath ==
The Syrian National Congress held its first session in Damascus on 3 June 1919.

One of the congress’s first tasks was preparing a memorandum for the King–Crane Commission, outlining Syrian views on independence and foreign mandates. The document later became known as the Damascus programme.

In 1920, the congress proclaimed the independence of Syria, declared Faisal king, and acted as a constituent assembly by drafting the first constitution of the Arab Kingdom of Syria.

== See also ==
- Syrian National Congress
- Arab Kingdom of Syria
- King–Crane Commission
- Paris Peace Conference (1919–1920)
