= Aladdin al-Droubi government =

1920 Syrian government

- Government of Syria
- Date formed: 25 July 1920
- Date dissolved: 21 August 1920
- High Commissioner: Henri Gouraud
- Prime Minister: Aladdin al-Droubi
- No. of ministers: 8

History
- Incoming formation: Capture of Damascus
- Predecessor: H. al-Atassi I
- Successor: al-Ulshi

The Aladdin al-Droubi government was formed on 25 July 1920 by an official communiqué published in issue No. 142 of al-Asima on 29 July 1920. The government came to an end with the assassination of Aladdin al-Droubi and Abdul Rahman al-Yusuf in the village of Khirbet Ghazaleh on 21 August 1920.

It was the first government formed under the French Mandate for Syria. It was also the first Syrian government in which both the prime minister and one of its members were assassinated.

== Achievements ==
The government attempted to accept the French Mandate on the basis of the Faisal–Clemenceau Agreement. However, France informed Prime Minister Aladdin al-Droubi that it had decided to end the rule of King Faisal. The prime minister was instructed to notify the king of the decision.

General Goybet, commander of the French army that occupied Damascus, declared that the Syrian government must consult the French authorities before taking any political or administrative decision. He also demanded that revolutionaries and opponents of the mandate be brought to trial. In a second message sent to al-Droubi on 27 July, General Goybet further demanded that Syria pay ten million French francs to France as war compensation, in addition to disarming the Syrian army and referring its officers to military tribunals. The government accepted and implemented all of these conditions during a cabinet session held on the same day. During the same meeting, the government reinstated the emergency law and martial law regulations.

On 28 July, the government supervised the formal end of the Arab Kingdom of Syria by exiling King Faisal I. A train provided by France transported him from Damascus to Daraa, and from there to Haifa, bringing what Syrian nationalists referred to as the “First Independence Era” to an end.

On 10 August 1920, the government ratified the Treaty of Sèvres, under which Syria relinquished Cilicia to Turkey, while Syria itself was described as an independent state under French mandate. Formal ratification of the mandate system by the League of Nations would not occur until 1922.

Al-Droubi's tenure as prime minister was short-lived. Less than a month after the government's formation, on 19 August 1920, al-Durubi and the president of the Consultative Council, Abd al-Rahman al-Yusuf, were assassinated during a visit to Khirbet Ghazaleh in Daraa Governorate. Two days later, on 21 August 1920, the remaining ministers met and delegated the duties of prime minister to the minister of defense, Jamil al-Ulshi, in an acting capacity. The French high commissioner later formally approved the appointment.

On 1 September 1920, General Henri Gouraud proclaimed the creation of the Alawite State, the State of Greater Lebanon, and the State of Aleppo, while the United Kingdom had already occupied Palestine and Jordan. As a result, the government's effective authority became limited to what later became known as the State of Damascus. One week later, on 6 September 1920, Henri Gouraud issued a decree dismissing the cabinet and appointing a new government.

== Composition ==
Portfolio	Minister	Took office	Left office
Prime Minister	Aladdin al-Droubi	25 July 1920	21 August 1920
President of the Consultative Council	Abdul Rahman al-Yusuf	25 July 1920	21 August 1920
Minister of Foreign Affairs	Aladdin al-Droubi (acting)	25 July 1920	21 August 1920
Minister of War	Jamil al-Ulshi	25 July 1920	21 August 1920
Minister of Interior	Ata al-Ayyubi	25 July 1920	21 August 1920
Minister of Finance	Fares al-Khoury	9 March 1920	21 August 1920
Minister of Justice	Muhammad Jalal al-Din al-Zuhdi	9 March 1920	21 August 1920
Minister of Education	Badi' Muayyad al-Azm	25 July 1920	21 August 1920
Minister of Public Works, Trade, and Agriculture	Yusuf al-Hakim	5 May 1920	21 August 1920

== See also ==
- Council of Ministers (Syria)
- List of Syrian governments
- Government ministries of Syria
- List of prime ministers of Syria
