= Second Jamil al-Ulshi government =

1943 Syrian government

- 27th government of the Syrian Republic

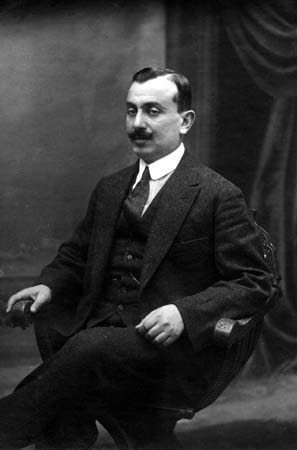
- Date formed: 8 January 1943
- Date dissolved: 25 March 1943

People and organisations
- President: Jamil al-Ulshi (acting)
- General Delegate: Georges Catroux
- Prime Minister: Jamil al-Ulshi
- Prime Minister's history: al-Ulshi I
- No. of ministers: 9
- Member parties: ▌National Bloc; ▌Independent

History
- Legislature term: –
- Predecessor: H. al-Barazi
- Successor: A. al-Ayyubi II

The Second Jamil al-Ulshi government was the twenty-seventh government in the history of modern Syria and the twelfth administration of the First Syrian Republic. Formed on 8 January 1943, it was the third and final government to serve under President Taj al-Din al-Hasani.

During the tenure of this government, President al-Hasani died in office, resulting in Jamil al-Ulshi assuming the position of acting president in accordance with the Syrian Constitution. Despite these constitutional provisions, the French High Commissioner exercised his exceptional legislative powers and dismissed the government on 25 March 1943. The dismissal bypassed the normal constitutional process and was intended to facilitate the formation of a neutral caretaker administration tasked with supervising forthcoming parliamentary elections. The government was consequently the last cabinet to serve under Taj al-Din al-Hasani before the political transition that preceded the 1943 elections.

== Composition ==
Portfolio	Minister	Took office	Left office	Party
Prime Minister	Jamil al-Ulshi	8 January 1943	25 March 1943	Independent
Minister of Interior	Jamil al-Ulshi	8 January 1943	25 March 1943	Independent
Minister of Foreign Affairs	Fayez al-Khoury	20 September 1941	25 March 1943	National Bloc
Minister of Public Works	Munir al-Abbas	20 September 1941	25 March 1943	Independent
Minister of Telegraphs and Mail	Munir al-Abbas	18 April 1942	25 March 1943	Independent
Minister of Justice	Munir al-Abbas (acting)	8 January 1943	25 March 1943	Independent
Minister of Finance	Mustafa al-Shihabi	8 January 1943	25 March 1943	Independent
Minister of Education	Khalil Mardam Bey	1 July 1942	25 March 1943	Independent
Minister of National Economy	Muhammad al-Ayish	20 September 1941	25 March 1943	Independent
Minister of Provisions and Supply	Hikmat al-Hiraki	20 September 1941	25 March 1943	Independent
Minister of National Defense	Hasan al-Atrash	18 April 1942	25 March 1943	Independent
Minister of Propaganda and Youth	Munir al-Ajlani	18 April 1942	25 March 1943	National Bloc

== See also ==
- Council of Ministers (Syria)
- List of Syrian governments
- Government ministries of Syria
- List of prime ministers of Syria
