= Polish Library in Washington, D.C. =

Community library in Washington DC

- Biblioteka Polska w Waszyngtonie
- Location: Washington, D.C., United States, United States
- Type: Community library
- Established: 1991

Collection
- Size: Approximately 8,000 items (2018)

Other information
- Website: polishlibrary.org

The Polish Library in Washington, D.C. (Polish: Biblioteka Polska w Waszyngtonie) is a volunteer-run community library serving the Polish diaspora in the Washington metropolitan area. Founded in 1991, the library collects Polish-language books, English-language publications about Poland, children's literature, audiovisual materials, and archival collections documenting the history of the Polish-American community. It is operated by the nonprofit organization Friends of the Polish Library in Washington, D.C., Inc..

== History ==
The library was founded in 1991 by Polish journalist and anti-communist activist Tadeusz Walendowski, who served as its first president until his death in 2004.

The library opened to the public in January 1992 and gradually built a collection through donations and acquisitions. In addition to lending books, it organized author talks, lectures, exhibitions, educational activities, and cultural events promoting Polish language, literature, history, and culture in the Washington metropolitan area.

By 2018, the library's holdings had grown to approximately 8,000 books, audiovisual materials, and archival items.

Later that year, following a series of flooding incidents affecting the building where the collections were stored, the library suspended its lending services and part of the collection was damaged. Since then, the organization has operated without a permanent location while continuing cultural programming and efforts to preserve its collections and secure a new home.

In 2026, a newly elected board initiated a broader organizational restructuring, including collection management, governance reforms, and preparations for the restoration of regular library services.

== Collections ==
The library's collections include Polish-language fiction and non-fiction, publications about Poland in English, children's and young adult literature, audiovisual materials, and archival collections related to the history of the Polish community in the Washington metropolitan area.

== Class of 1926 project ==
Between 2015 and 2017, the Polish Library in Washington partnered with the Library of Congress to digitize the Polish Declarations of Admiration and Friendship for the United States, a unique collection of 111 volumes presented to President Calvin Coolidge in 1926 to commemorate the 150th anniversary of the Declaration of Independence.

The project digitized Volumes 14–111, containing approximately 28,000 pages with more than 5.5 million signatures collected throughout Poland in 1926. The Library of Congress states that the digitization project was made possible through financial support provided by the Polish Library in Washington, its supporters, and the Ministry of Foreign Affairs of the Republic of Poland. Samuel Ponczak and Grażyna Żebrowska managed the Polish Library's participation in the project and served as the principal liaisons with Library of Congress staff.

== Publications ==
From 1992 to 2016, the library published Wiadomości z Biblioteki ("Library News"), a volunteer-produced periodical documenting the library's activities and the cultural life of the Polish-American community in the Washington metropolitan area. The publication featured interviews, essays, historical articles, book and film reviews, and reports on community events.

== Tadeusz Walendowski Award ==
Since 2007, the library has presented the Tadeusz Walendowski Award to individuals and institutions recognized for promoting Poland abroad and fostering mutual understanding between Poland and other nations.

== Presidents ==
President	Term
Tadeusz Walendowski	1991–2004
Zbigniew Okręglak	2004–2012
Anna Firsowicz	2012–2014
Paweł Stefański	2014–2015
Grażyna Żebrowska	2015–2018
Diana Milton	2018–2019
Krzysztof Sąsiadek	2019–2026
Katarzyna Grabska	2026–present

== See also ==
- Polish Americans
