= First Haqqi al-Azm government =

1920–1922 Syrian government

- Government of the State of Damascus

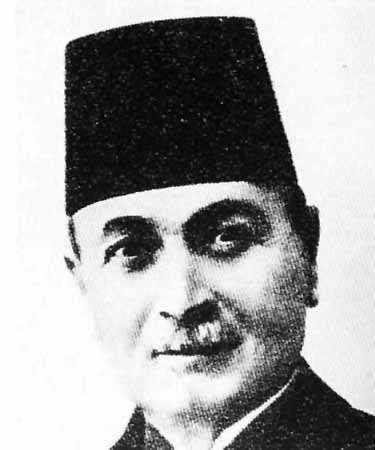
- Date formed: 1 December 1920
- Date dissolved: 28 June 1922

People and organisations
- Governor: Haqqi al-Azm
- High Commissioner: Henri Gouraud
- Head of government: Haqqi al-Azm
- No. of ministers: 6

History
- Outgoing formation: Creation of Syrian Federation
- Predecessor: al-Ulshi I
- Successor: Barakat I

The First Haqqi al-Azm government was formed on 1 December 1920 by decree signed by the High Commissioner and published in issue no. 170 of the official al-Asima gazette in 1920. It was dismissed on 28 June 1922.

== Overview ==
Due to France's partitioning of Syria into separate statelets along sectarian and ethnic lines, the jurisdiction and authority of this government, as well as its predecessor, were limited solely to the borders of the State of Damascus.

In State of Aleppo, the head of state was Kamil al-Qudsi. The Alawite government was administered first by Colonel Niéger and later by General Billotte, while Emir Salim al-Atrash governed Jabal al-Druze. This period came to an end when the statelets of Damascus, Aleppo, and the Alawite State were united under the name of the Federation of the Autonomous States of Syria.

The dismissal and dissolution of the government followed the outbreak of a general strike in Damascus beginning on 10 April 1922, followed by demonstrations and arrests on 18 April in protest against partition and the mandate. Although Henri Gouraud issued a decree imposing martial law and later declared a general amnesty for all detainees, he failed to calm the protests. Consequently, on 28 June 1922, he announced the establishment of the Syrian Federation between the State of Damascus, the State of Aleppo, and the Alawite State on a federal basis, and called for a constituent assembly of fifteen members to elect the federation's president, who would then form the new government. This led to the dismissal of the government on the same day.

This government did not exercise significant sovereign authority. As a mandate administration, it was limited to managing administrative affairs and lacked both a military arm represented by an army and an economic arm represented by a central bank.

== Composition ==
Portfolio	Minister	Took office	Left office
Director of Interior	Ata al-Ayyubi	25 July 1920	28 June 1922
Director of Justice	Badi' Muayyad al-Azm	6 September 1920	28 June 1922
Director of Finance	Hamdi al-Nasr	6 September 1920	28 June 1922
Director of Education	Muhammad Kurd Ali	6 September 1920	28 June 1922
Director of Public Works	Shakir al-Qayyim	6 September 1920	28 June 1922
Director of Military Affairs	Nasuhi al-Bukhari	1 December 1920	28 June 1922

== See also ==
- Council of Ministers (Syria)
- List of Syrian governments
- Government ministries of Syria
- List of prime ministers of Syria
