= Council of Directors (1919–1920) =

1919–1920 Syrian government

- 3rd government of Syria

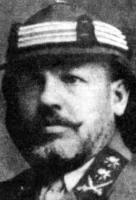
- Date formed: 4 August 1919
- Date dissolved: 26 January 1920

People and organisations
- Governor-General: Faisal bin Hussein
- Chairman: Faisal bin Hussein
- No. of ministers: 7

History
- Predecessor: al-Rikabi I
- Successor: Council of Directors II

The Council of Directors was a governing body established in Syria on 4 August 1919 by Prince Faisal, who presided over it. The formation of the council was published in the official gazette al-Asima in issue No. 53, dated 25 August 1919.

== Background ==
The council was formed following the resignation of the al-Rikabi's first government. Faisal appointed al-Rikabi as his deputy in the council while retaining his title of Military Governor, so as not to appear — even nominally — to be acting against the wishes of General Allenby.

== Political orientation ==
The Council of Directors was considered moderate in its outlook, accepting Faisal's policy of welcoming a mandate from either the United States or Britain, at a time when Syrian nationalists had rejected such an arrangement.

The government did not have a national or unitary character, as it consisted of four directors with Syrian nationalist ideas (Iskandar Ammoun and Rashid Talaa from the Syrian Union Party, Said Shuqair from the Moderate Liberal Party, and Gabriel Haddad, a British officer) and only al-Hashimi and al-Husri remained with a pan-Arab nationalist orientation. Al-Rikabi was a moderate who wanted to solve the Syrian issue, even by foreign mandate.

== Composition ==
Portfolio	Minister	Took office	Left office
Deputy of Prince Faisal & Military Governor	Ali Rida al-Rikabi	30 September 1918	26 January 1920
Director of Justice	Iskandar Ammoun	30 September 1918	26 January 1920
Director of Interior	Rashid Talaa	30 September 1918	26 January 1920
Director of Finance	Said Shuqair	30 September 1918	26 January 1920
Chairman of the Military Affairs Council	Yasin al-Hashimi	4 August 1919	26 January 1920
Director of Education	Sati' al-Husri	30 September 1918	26 January 1920
Secretary General of the Board of Directors	Gabriel Haddad	4 August 1919	26 January 1920

== See also ==
- Council of Ministers (Syria)
- List of Syrian governments
- Government ministries of Syria
- List of prime ministers of Syria
