= First Jamil al-Ulshi government =

1920 Syrian government

- Government of the State of Damascus

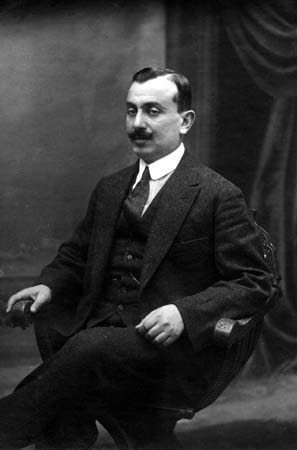
- Date formed: 6 September 1920
- Date dissolved: 30 November 1920
- High Commissioner: Henri Gouraud
- Prime Minister: Jamil al-Ulshi
- No. of ministers: 7

History
- Predecessor: al-Droubi
- Successor: H. al-Azm I

The First Jamil al-Ulshi government was formed on 6 September 1920, following a two-week crisis that ended with the country being divided into smaller states and the High Commissioner assuming power. The decree forming the government was published in the al-Asima newspaper, issue no. 152, on the same day. The government resigned on 30 November 1920.

Due to France's partioning of Syria into smaller states along sectarian and ethnic lines, the jurisdiction and authority of this government, and those that followed it, were limited to the borders of the State of Damascus.

== Composition ==
Portfolio	Minister	Took office	Left office
Prime Minister	Jamil al-Ulshi	6 September 1920	30 November 1920
President of the Consultative Council	Haqqi al-Azm	6 September 1920	30 November 1920
Minister of War	Jamil al-Ulshi	25 July 1920	30 November 1920
Minister of Interior	Ata al-Ayyubi	25 July 1920	30 November 1920
Minister of Finance	Hamdi al-Nasr	6 September 1920	30 November 1920
Minister of Justice	Badi' Muayyad al-Azm	6 September 1920	30 November 1920
Minister of Education	Muhammad Kurd Ali	6 September 1920	30 November 1920
Minister of Public Works, Trade, and Agriculture	Shakir al-Qayyim	6 September 1920	30 November 1920

== See also ==
- Council of Ministers (Syria)
- List of Syrian governments
- Government ministries of Syria
- List of prime ministers of Syria
