= Muhammad Said al-Jaza'iri government =

1918 Syrian government

- 1st government of Syria

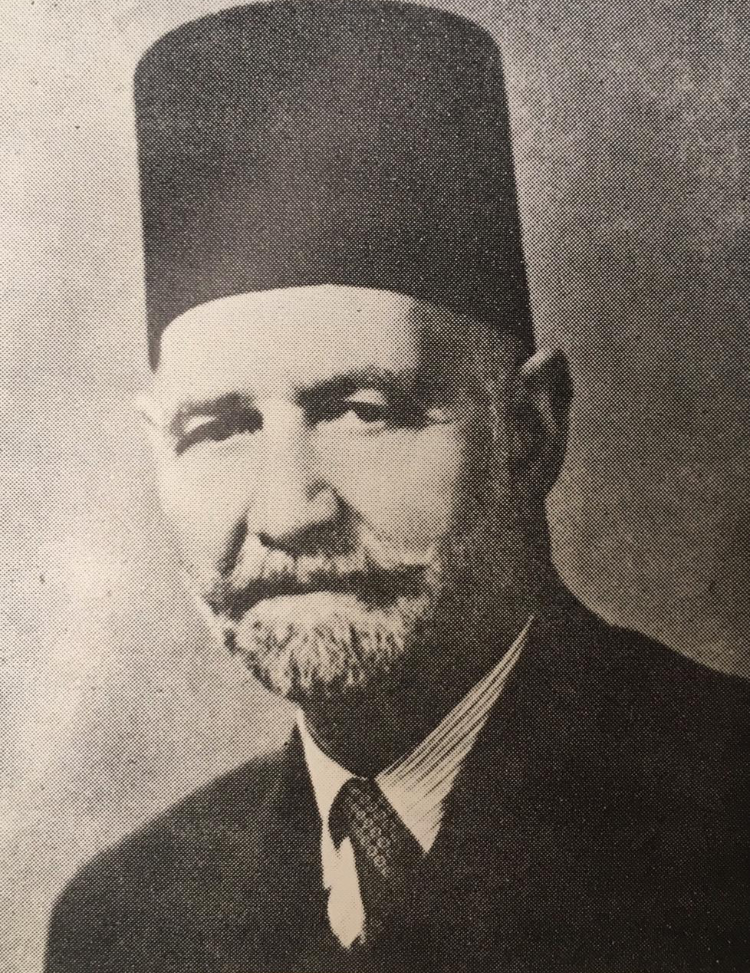
- Date formed: 27 September 1918
- Date dissolved: 30 September 1918

People and organisations
- Head of state: Vacant
- Head of government: Muhammad Said al-Jaza'iri
- No. of ministers: 6

History
- Incoming formation: Ottoman withdrawal
- Successor: al-Rikabi I

The Muhammad Said al-Jaza'iri government was a short-lived government formed on 27 September 1918 by the Provisional Shura Council of Damascus and lasted until 30 September 1918.

This government was formed at the request of the Arab Revolt forces, and its mandate ended with the arrival of Rida Pasha al-Rikabi in Damascus, who assumed power as Military Governor.

This government is considered a transitional government, formed in the wake of the Ottoman withdrawal, during which he appointed himself Civil Governor of Damascus and formed this cabinet of five ministers without assigning any of them a specific portfolio.

== Composition ==
Minister	Took office	Left office
Muhammad Said al-Jaza'iri	27 September 1918	30 September 1918
Shukri al-Ayyubi	27 September 1918	30 September 1918
Shakir al-Hanbali	27 September 1918	30 September 1918
Fares al-Khoury	27 September 1918	30 September 1918
Jamil al-Ulshi	27 September 1918	30 September 1918
Sa'di Kahhala	27 September 1918	30 September 1918

== See also ==
- Council of Ministers (Syria)
- List of Syrian governments
- Government ministries of Syria
- List of prime ministers of Syria
