= Syrian Declaration of Independence (1941) =

The Syrian Declaration of Independence refers to the unilateral proclamation of Syrian independence on 27 September 1941 by General Georges Catroux, representing Free France, following the Allied campaign against Vichy French forces in the Levant during World War II.

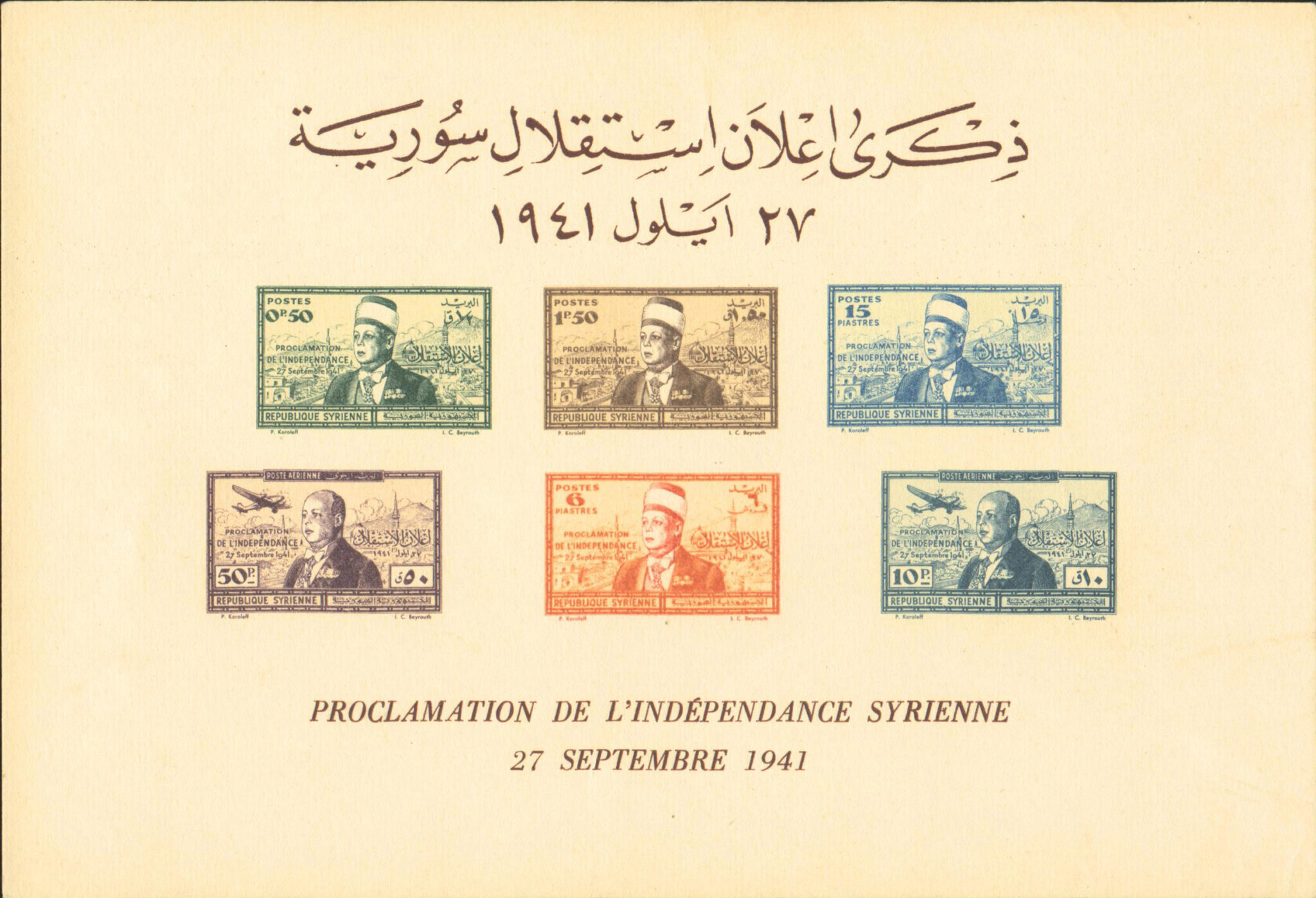
Collection of Syrian postage stamps commemorating the 1st anniversary of the Proclamation of Independence.

== Background ==
Under the French Mandate for Syria and Lebanon, Syria remained under French control despite growing nationalist movements. In 1936, a treaty of independence was signed between Syria and France, However, France refused to ratify the treaty. During World War II, the fall of France in 1940 placed Syria under the authority of Vichy France, which collaborated with Nazi Germany.

In mid-1941, British and Free French forces launched a military campaign to end Axis influence in the region. After the defeat of Vichy forces, Free France assumed control.

== Proclamation ==
On 27 September 1941, General Catroux proclaimed the independence of Syria on behalf of Free France. Cornelius Van Hemert Engert, the American Consul General at Beirut summarised the following points from the proclamation:

- Syria to exercise at once all rights and prerogatives of an independent and sovereign state, limited only by the exigencies of the war and the security of its territory.
- Its position as ally of Free France and of Great Britain requires close conformity of its policy with that of the Allies.
- “By assuming independent international life Syria assumes of course the rights and obligations heretofore subscribed to in its name.”
- Syria has the right to appoint diplomatic representatives wherever it considers it necessary. Elsewhere Free France will use its good offices to protect Syrian interests and nationals.
- Great Britain having already undertaken to recognise Syrian independence Free France will immediately approach other friendly or Allied Powers to obtain recognition from them too.
- Free France favors closer ties between the different parts of Syria and will therefore modify the special status of certain regions so as to put them politically under a central Syrian government while maintaining their financial and administrative autonomy.
- It is understood that all guarantees under public law in favor of individuals and religious communities will be respected.
- Free France will assist in establishing better economic collaboration between Syria and the Lebanon.
- For the duration of the war the Allies will take charge of the defense of the country. To that end the Syrian national forces will cooperate and place at the disposal of the Allies all communications, landing fields and ports. Gendarmerie and police will collaborate with the Free French in protecting Syria against internal enemies.
- Syria being included in the war zone and in the economic and financial system of the Allies the closest collaboration is also necessary regarding all measures of economic warfare. Syria having entered the sterling bloc will accord the greatest possible freedom of trade with the countries of that bloc and will adopt the necessary economic, financial and exchange measures in harmony with the pledging of the sterling bloc.
- The above stipulations are inspired by the sole thought of winning the war and thereby assuring to Syria the future of a free people. Despite the war Free France did not wish to delay the fulfillment of Syrian national aspirations but it is necessary that as soon as possible a Franco-Syrian treaty definitely consecrate the independence of the country.

== Aftermath ==
Despite the proclamation, France retained significant political and military influence, and full sovereignty was not immediately realised although Syria gradually gained greater autonomy. Independence was internationally recognised by several states in 1944, and Syria became a founding member of the United Nations in 1945.

Tensions between Syrian nationalists and French authorities continued, culminating in violent confrontations in Damascus in 1945. Under international pressure, France agreed to withdraw its forces, completing evacuation in April 1946, which is commonly regarded as the achievement of full Syrian independence.

== See also ==
- Syrian Declaration of Independence (1920)
- French Mandate for Syria and Lebanon
- First Syrian Republic
- Arab nationalism
- History of Syria
