= Syrian Basic Law of 1920 =

First constitution of Syria

Basic Law of the Arab Kingdom of Syria

Overview
- Original title: القانون الأساسي للمملكة السورية العربية
- Jurisdiction: Arab Kingdom of Syria
- Presented: July 5, 1920
- Ratified: July 13, 1920
- Date effective: July 13, 1920
- System: Parliamentary constitutional monarchy

Government structure
- Branches: Three (executive, legislative and judiciary)
- Head of state: King
- Chambers: Bicameral (Congress: Senate, Chamber of Deputies)
- Executive: Prime Minister
- Judiciary: Supreme Court
- Federalism: No
- First legislature: None
- Repealed: July 25, 1920
- Author: Syrian National Congress

Full text
- Constitution of Syria (1920) at Wikisource
- القانون الأساسي للمملكة السورية العربية at Arabic Wikisource

The Syrian Basic Law of 1920 was the first constitution of Syria, adopted during the brief existence of the Arab Kingdom of Syria under King Faisal I. Drafted and adopted by the Syrian National Congress, it established Syria as a secular, constitutional monarchy with a representative parliamentary system, separation of powers, and national sovereignty. The constitution remained in force only for a few days before the French occupation of Damascus following the Battle of Maysalun and the imposition of the French Mandate, which annulled the constitutional order. Despite its short lifespan, the 1920 constitution is regarded as a foundational document in the development of modern Syrian constitutional thought.

The constitution also established pan-Arab motivations across modern-day Syria, Lebanon, Palestine, and Transjordan, who were previous referred to as the "vilayets of Damascus, Aleppo, Beirut, and the sanjaks of Jerusalem and Deir Ezzor" as Ottoman provinces.
