= Syrian Declaration of Independence (1920) =

The Syrian Declaration of Independence was a proclamation adopted on 8 March 1920 by the Syrian National Congress in Damascus, declaring the independence of Syria from Ottoman and Allied control and establishing the Arab Kingdom of Syria. The declaration named Faisal bin Hussein as king and asserted Syrian sovereignty over a territory broadly corresponding to Greater Syria.

== Background ==
During World War I, the Ottoman Empire, which had ruled much of the Levant for centuries, collapsed. Arab nationalist leaders, supported in part by the British during the Arab Revolt, sought independence for Arab territories. Following the war, however, the Allied powers pursued competing imperial interests, formalised in agreements such as the Sykes–Picot Agreement and decisions of the Paris Peace Conference.

In Syria, political activism intensified between 1918 and 1920. Local leaders convened the Syrian National Congress to represent the aspirations of the population amid uncertainty about the region’s postwar status.

== Declaration ==
On 8 March 1920, the Syrian National Congress proclaimed:

- The complete independence of Syria.
- The establishment of a constitutional monarchy.
- Faisal bin Hussein as King of Syria.
- Rejection of any foreign mandate or protectorate.

The declaration asserted sovereignty over territories including modern-day Syria, Lebanon, Palestine, and Transjordan, reflecting the concept of Greater Syria.

== Aftermath ==
The declaration was not recognized by the Allied powers. At the San Remo Conference, France was awarded the Mandate for Syria and Lebanon, while the United Kingdom was awarded the Mandate for Palestine. French forces advanced toward Damascus, leading to the Battle of Maysalun on 24 July 1920. The Syrian army was defeated, Damascus was occupied, and the Kingdom of Syria was dissolved.

King Faisal went into exile, later becoming King of Iraq. Syria was subsequently divided into several French-administered statelets under the mandate system.

== See also ==
- Syrian Declaration of Independence (1941)
- Arab Kingdom of Syria
- Syrian National Congress
- French Mandate for Syria and Lebanon
- Arab nationalism
- History of Syria
