= Syrian National Congress =

1919 summit of the future of Great Syria after the Ottoman expulsion

Syrian National Congress المؤتمر السوري العام

Type
- Type: Constituent assembly of Arab Kingdom of Syria

History
- Founded: June 3, 1919
- Disbanded: July 25, 1920

Leadership
- Speaker: Muhammad Fawzi al-Azm (until November 14, 1919); Hashim al-Atassi (December 11, 1919 – May 3, 1920); Rashid Rida (May 5, 1920)
- Seats: 120

Elections
- First election: 1919 Syrian National Congress election

Meeting place
- The Arab Club building, Damascus

The Syrian National Congress, also called the Pan-Syrian Congress and General Syrian Congress (GSC), was convened in May 1919 in Damascus, Syria, after the expulsion of the Ottomans from Syria. The mission of the Congress was to consider the future of "Syria", by which was meant the region of Syria: present-day Syria, Lebanon, Israel, Palestine, and Jordan. The Congress also intended to present Arab views to the American King–Crane Commission of inquiry. The Congress was considered the first national parliament in the modern history of Syria.

The Congress was attended by representatives from all parts of Greater Syria, including Lebanon and Palestine, and was headed by Hashim al-Atassi. Some participants showed support for King Faisal's demands, while others were beginning to question his willingness to make concessions to pro-Zionist groups. In its final report it pleaded that "there be no separation of the southern part of Syria, known as Palestine, nor of the littoral western zone, which includes Lebanon, from the Syrian country." The King-Crane Commission recommended "the unity of Syria be preserved" in response.

The Congress declared an independent Arab Kingdom of Syria on March 8, 1920, proclaiming:

The full and absolute independence of our country Syria, including Palestine, within her natural boundaries, based on a civil, representative form of government, protection of the rights of minorities, and rejection of the claims of the Zionists to Palestine as a national homeland or place of immigration for the Jews.

The new state intended to include Syria, Palestine, Lebanon and portions of northern Mesopotamia. King Faisal was declared the head of state. At the same time Prince Zeid, Faisal's brother, was declared regent of Mesopotamia. Hashim al-Atassi was named Prime Minister and Yusuf al-'Azma became Minister of War and Chief of Staff.

The Congress continued during the short-lived life of the Kingdom until July 17, 1920, when the French gave Faisal an ultimatum to surrender or fight, and Faisal surrendered, bringing to an end the Kingdom and dissolving its institutions.

== Members ==
The Syrian National Congress had 120 members; 85 elected deputies representing various regions in Ottoman Syria, and 35 tribal chiefs and heads of religious communities.

The members of the Congress were divided into three main blocs referred to as parties. However, it is unclear whether they constituted official party organizations or just parliamentary blocs. The blocs include the Progress Party, which formed the ruling bloc emanating from the al-Fatat organisation and included about 60 members, the Democratic Party, which represented the main opposition bloc and included about 30 members, in addition to a group of independent members who did not belong to either of the two blocs and are estimated at about 20 members.

== Gallery ==
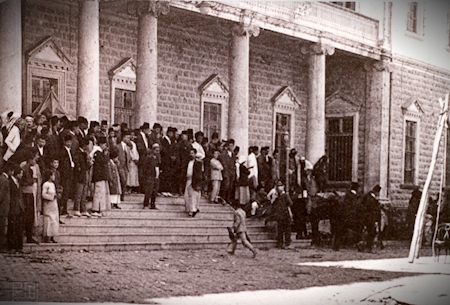
On the steps of the Sarai building.

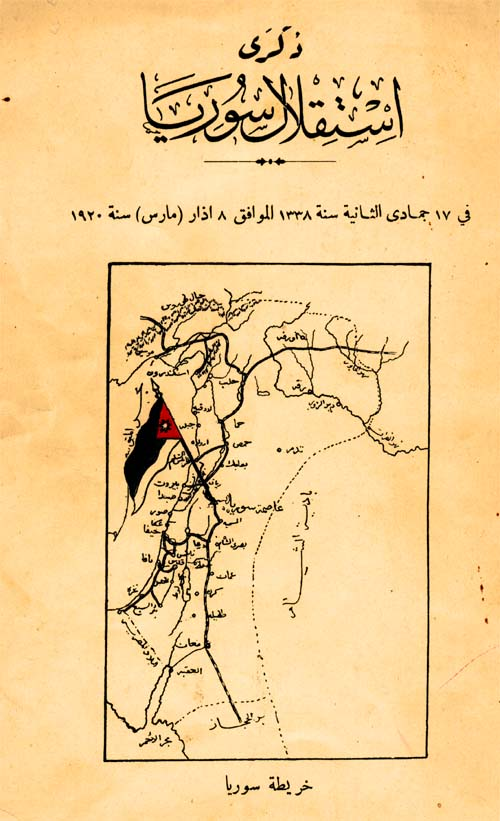
Book of the Independence of Syria (ذكرى استقلال سوريا). Shows the declared borders of the Kingdom of Syria and states the date of the Declaration of Independence March 8, 1920.
