= Official Gazette (Syria) =

Official government gazette of Syria

- Native name: الجريدة الرسمية
- Type: Weekly official gazette
- Owner: Government of Syria
- Founder: Arab Government of Syria
- Founded: 17 February 1919; 107 years ago
- Language: Arabic
- Headquarters: Damascus
- Country: Syria

The Official Gazette (Arabic: الجريدة الرسمية, romanized: al-Jarīdah al-Rasmiyyah), officially known as the Official Gazette of the Syrian Arab Republic, is the weekly government gazette issued by the Syrian government. It records and publishes decrees, laws, decisions, circulars and minutes of the People's Assembly, and serves as a reference source for legal and governmental matters in the country.

== Origins and title ==
The origins of the Syrian Official Gazette lie in the newspaper al-Asima (العاصمة), a government newspaper published in Damascus following the end of Ottoman rule, during the rule of Emir Faisal. Its first issue was published on 17 February 1919 at the direction of military governor Ali Rida al-Rikabi, with journalist Muhibb al-Din al-Khatib appointed as editor-in-chief and assisted by lawyer Shakir al-Hanbali.

Al-Asima published official decrees and laws alongside other material. It was issued twice weekly in eight medium-format pages. The newspaper continued as an official bulletin under the French Mandate before becoming a monthly publication at the beginning of 1922. It was later published twice monthly by the Secretariat of the Damascus municipality in both Arabic and French, as an official government newspaper supervised by the French Mandate authorities. It published instructions, decrees, notices, and other decisions of the Syrian state during that period.

It continued to be published under the name Al-Asima until the end of 1930. In 1932, it appeared as the al-Nashrah al-Rasmiyyah (النشرة الرسمية, "Official Bulletin"), which was later replaced by a new publication titled the al-Jarīdah al-Rasmiyyah ("Official Gazette"), the name and format used to the present day.

== Legal framework ==
Official publication in Syria is regulated by Law No. 5 of 2004, the "Official Gazette Publication and Notifications System", promulgated by President Bashar al-Assad on 22 March 2004. The law replaced the earlier publication law established by Legislative Decree No. 5 of 1936.

The law defines publication in the Official Gazette as the reproduction of an identical copy of the original legal instrument subject to publication. It specifies categories that are to be published, including laws and legislative decrees; decrees concerning the formation and resignation of governments and the appointment of ministers; regulatory decrees and decisions; interpretative texts concerning laws and regulations; memoranda of the People's Assembly; patents and trademarks; and the registration of foreign and joint-stock companies, among other categories.

Article 3 of the law permits certain laws, decrees and decisions not to be published, or to be published in abridged form, on grounds of "national defence and the requirements of state security". According to a study by the Omran Center for Strategic Studies, cited by Syria TV, the former Assad government relied on this provision not to publish 140 pieces of legislation between 2010 and 2023, including 110 legislative decrees and 30 laws.

Formally, the Official Gazette is published in Arabic in the capital; it may be published in a foreign language by decision of the Prime Minister. It is issued whenever necessary, and at least once a week. The Official Gazette consists of two parts:

- Part 1: legislative, regulatory, and interpretative texts.
- Part 2: three sections comprising other decrees and decisions; circulars, announcements, and summaries of judicial rulings; and minutes of the People's Assembly.

== Frequency and subscription ==
The Gazette is issued weekly in two parts. Part one is issued each Wednesday and part two each Thursday; supplements or additional issues may also be published.

The Official Gazette is not sold in bookshops or newspaper kiosks. It is available through annual subscription, including subscriptions made at any point during the calendar year, from the Directorate of Printing and the Official Gazette in Damascus. It may be obtained in print or as a PDF electronic version at the same price, either directly from the Directorate or by postal subscription.

== Access and electronic availability ==
The Syrian Official Gazette is not available through an official state electronic portal, and its files are not searchable because of their format. This has made access to its contents difficult for researchers, activists and the general public. Some users purchase PDF copies and use optical character recognition (OCR) to extract text, a process described as relatively costly.

By contrast, the Syrian Salvation Government in Idlib issued its own official gazette. Its first issue appeared on 13 May 2023, and publication continued through issue 80 on 5 December 2024, three days before the fall of the Assad government. Individual issues could be searched, unlike the official gazette issued under the former government.
